= List of Occupy movement topics =

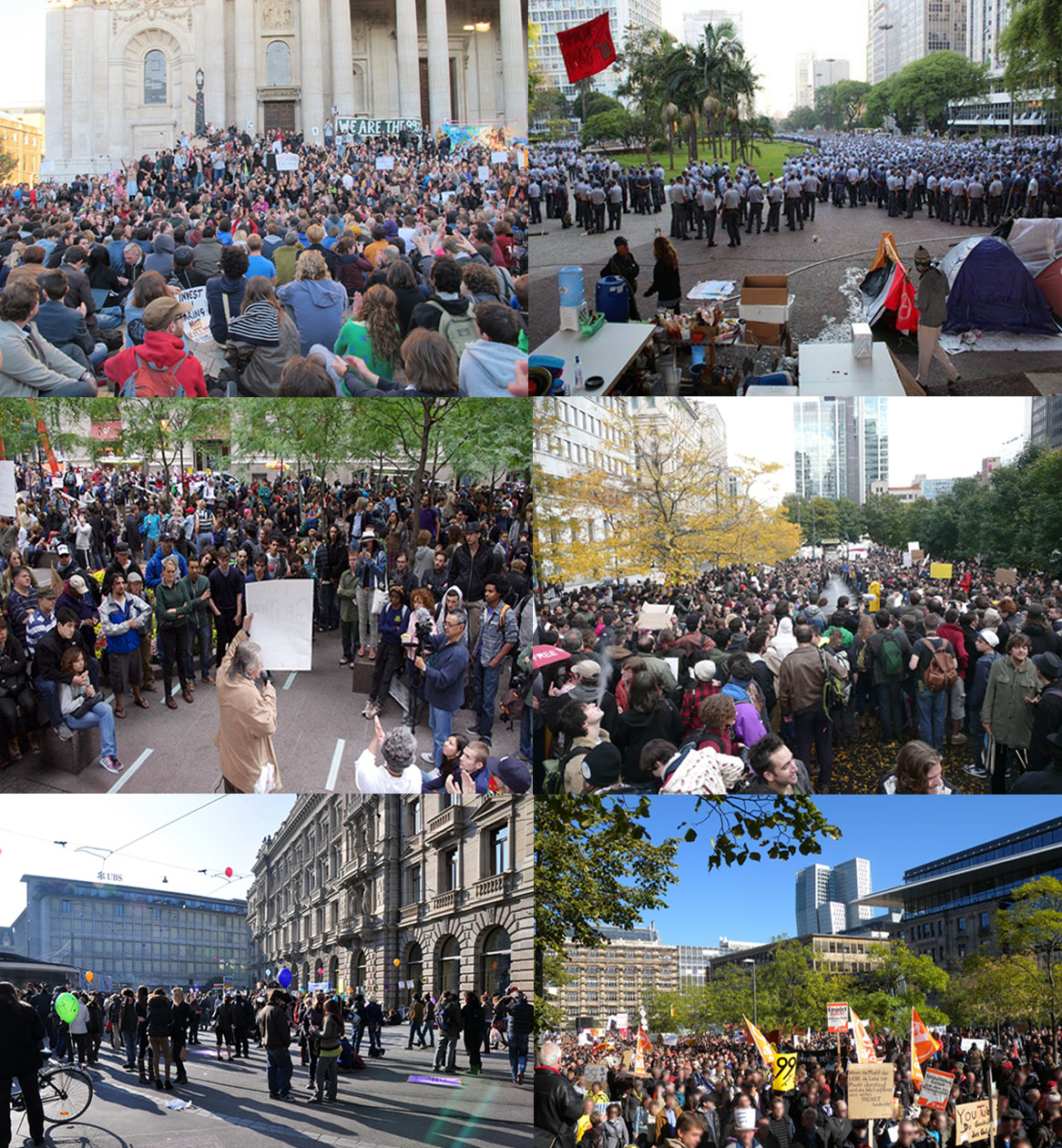
Worldwide Occupy movement protests on 15 October 2011

This is a list of Occupy movement topics on Wikipedia. The Occupy movement is the international branch of the Occupy Wall Street movement that protests against social and economic inequality around the world, its primary goal being to make the economic and political relations in all societies less vertically hierarchical and more flatly distributed. Local groups often have different focuses, but the movement's principle focus is to highlight that large corporations (and the global financial system) control the world in a way that disproportionately benefits a minority, undermines democracy, and is unstable.

== Occupy movement topics ==
- Occupy movement
- 1% (South Park)
- 15 October 2011 global protests
- 99 Percenters
- Anarchism and the Occupy movement
- Anti-mask laws
- Bank Transfer Day
- Declaration (book)
- Fuelling Poverty
- General assembly (Occupy movement)
- Leah Hunt-Hendrix
- List of Occupy movement protest locations
- Mashtots Park Movement
- Min Reyes
- Occupy (book)
- Occupy Buffer Zone
- Occupy Faith
- Occupy Homes
- Occupy Love
- Occupy Sandy
- Occupy This Album
- Progressive stack
- Reactions to the Occupy movement
- We are the 99%

== Occupy Wall Street ==
- Adbusters
- Avoid pi
- Charging Bull
- Economic inequality
- Illuminator Art Collective
- Liberty Square Blueprint
- Occupy Comics
- Occupy movement hand signals
- Occupy the Hood
- Occupy Wall Street
- OWS Media Group
- Reactions to Occupy Wall Street
- Protest paradigm in media coverage of Occupy Wall Street
- The Occupy Handbook
- The People's Library
- Thirty Meter Telescope protests
- Timeline of Occupy Wall Street
- 1% (South Park)
- V for Vendetta
- Wall Street
- Zuccotti Park
- 99 Percent Declaration
- 99%: The Occupy Wall Street Collaborative Film

== Individuals ==
- David Graeber
- Foo Conner
- Lupe Fiasco
- Jesse LaGreca
- Paul Mayer (activist)
- Cecily McMillan
- Tim Pool
- Kshama Sawant
- Justin Wedes
- Micah M. White

== Location ==
List of Occupy movement protest locations

=== Hong Kong ===
- 2014 Hong Kong protests
- Art of the Umbrella Movement
- Boundless Oceans, Vast Skies
- Gau wu
- Lennon Wall Hong Kong
- Reactions to the 2014 Hong Kong protests
- Umbrella Movement
- Umbrella Square
- Umbrella Ultra Marathon

=== United Kingdom ===
- Bank of Ideas
- Bloomsbury Social Centre
- Occupy Bath
- Occupy Edinburgh
- Occupy Glasgow
- Occupy London
- The Occupied Times of London

=== United States ===
- Law enforcement and the Occupy movement
- List of Occupy movement protest locations in the United States
- Occupy movement in the United States
- List of Occupy movement protest locations in California
  - Occupy San José
  - Occupy UC Davis
    - UC Davis pepper-spray incident
  - Occupy Cal
  - Occupy Oakland
    - Frank H. Ogawa Plaza
    - 2011 Oakland general strike
    - Jean Quan
    - Timeline of Occupy Oakland
- General assembly (Occupy movement)
- Human microphone
- Occupy Ashland
- Occupy Atlanta
- Occupy Austin
- Occupy Baltimore
- Occupy Boston
- Occupy Buffalo
- Occupy Charlotte
- Occupy Charlottesville
- Occupy Chicago
- Occupy D.C.
- Occupy Eugene
- Occupy Houston
- Occupy Las Vegas
- Occupy Los Angeles
- Occupy Minneapolis
- Occupy Monsanto
- Occupy movement hand signals
- Occupy Nashville
- Occupy OC
- Occupy Pittsburgh
- Occupy Philadelphia
- Occupy Portland
- Occupy Providence
- Occupy Redwood City
- Occupy Rochester NY
- Occupy Rose Parade
- Occupy Sacramento
- Occupy Salem
- Occupy Salt Lake City
- Occupy San Diego
- Occupy San Francisco
- Occupy Seattle
- Occupy St. Louis
- Occupy Texas State
- Occupy the Hood
- Occupy the Farm
- Occupy the SEC
- Occupy UC Davis
- Occupy Unmasked
- Occupy Vanderbilt
- Occupy Wall Street
- Progressive stack
- Thirty Meter Telescope protests

=== Other locations ===
- Blockupy (Frankfurt)
- Occupy Baluwatar
- Occupy Berlin
- Occupy Buffer Zone
- Occupy Canada
- Occupy Central (2011–12)
- Occupy Cork
- Occupy Dame Street
- Occupy Dataran
- Occupy Ghana
- Occupy Harvard
- Occupy Melbourne
- Occupy Nigeria
- Occupy protests in New Zealand
- Occupy Reykjavík
- Occupy Oslo
- Occupy Ottawa
- Occupy South Africa
- Occupy Sydney
- Occupy Toronto
- Occupy Windsor
- 2011 Rome demonstration

== See also ==
- Economic inequality
