= Occupy Redwood City =

Protest group against economic inequality

- Part of the Occupy movement
- Occupy Redwood City's logo
- Date: 28 October 2011 – present
- Location: Redwood City, California, United States; 37.486944°N 122.229722°W
- Caused by: Economic inequality, corporate influence over government, inter alia.
- Methods: Nonviolent protest; Civil disobedience; Occupation; Picketing; Demonstrations; Internet activism; Direct action; Street protesters
- Status: Ongoing

Arrests and injuries
- Injuries: 0
- Arrested: 0

Occupy Redwood City was a collaboration that began with peaceful protests, demonstrations, and general assemblies in front of the historic San Mateo County Courthouse in Redwood City, California. The demonstration was inspired by Occupy Wall Street and is part of the larger "Occupy" protest movement.

The aim of the demonstration was to begin a sustained culture of direct action and local activism against income inequality as well as both corporate and government unaccountability in the communities of Redwood City and elsewhere along the Peninsula. Redwood City is the county seat of San Mateo County which is the site of some of California's worst examples of income disparity.

Occupy Redwood City protests perceived corporate greed and social inequality, including opposing corporate influence in U.S. politics, the influence of money and corporations on democracy, and a lack of legal and political repercussions for the 2008 financial crisis. Occupy Redwood City continues to meet on Fridays at 5:00 PM on Courthouse Square, with a general assembly following the rally.

As of June 2012, Occupy Redwood City had continued to engage in organized meetings, events and actions.

== Characteristics of the local Occupy group ==
In addition to the Friday protests in front of the historic San Mateo County Courthouse, the group has two functional committees: a Media/Communications working group and a Planning/Events working group. They are currently starting a third working group to lobby local government entities to bank with local, community banks instead of large, national banks.

== Chronology of events ==
- On Saturday, September 17, 2011, Occupy Wall Street protests began in New York.
- On Friday, October 28, about fifty people came together for Occupy Redwood City's first general assembly. A proposal to continue to meet weekly on Friday evenings was passed. A proposal to officially stand in support of Scott Olsen was also passed, while a proposal to take action against the controversial Cargill development was tabled after being blocked by two participants. Former Assemblymember Sally Lieber attended.
- On Friday, November 11, a small group of Occupy Redwood City members spoke out in honor of veterans in the downtown theater district.
- On Friday, November 25, Congresswoman Anna Eshoo visited Occupy Redwood City and participated in the general assembly.
- On Monday, December 5, an Occupy Redwood City protester delivered a letter to the City Council protesting outgoing mayor Jeff Ira's negative comments about the Occupy movement.
- On Tuesday, December 6, Occupy Redwood City joined with Occupy San Jose and other community activists to protest inside the downtown branch of Chase in an effort to stop a homeowner's impending foreclosure and eviction. The protesters won a two-month moratorium and a promise to work with the homeowner from the bank.
- On Saturday, December 17, about two dozen people from Occupy Redwood City, Occupy San Jose, Occupy Palo Alto, Occupy Half Moon Bay, and other groups marched into the downtown branches of the Big Four banks, urging customers and employees to move their money into credit unions and independent local community banks.
- On Sunday, January 1, 2012, Occupy Redwood City released a set of twelve resolutions for the New Year; together the resolutions represent the closest thing to a manifesto the group has released to date.

== See also ==
Occupy articles

- List of "Occupy" protest locations
- Occupy movement
- Timeline of Occupy Wall Street
- We are the 99%

Other Bay Area "Occupy" protest articles

- Occupy Half Moon Bay
- Occupy Oakland
- Occupy San Francisco
- Occupy San Jose

Other 2011 protests

- 15 October 2011 global protests
- 2011 United States public employee protests
- 2011 Wisconsin protests

Related articles

- Bank Transfer Day
- Arab Spring
- Corruption Perceptions Index
- Economic inequality
- Income inequality in the United States
- Tea Party protests
- Wealth inequality in the United States

Related portals:
