= Timeline of Occupy Oakland =

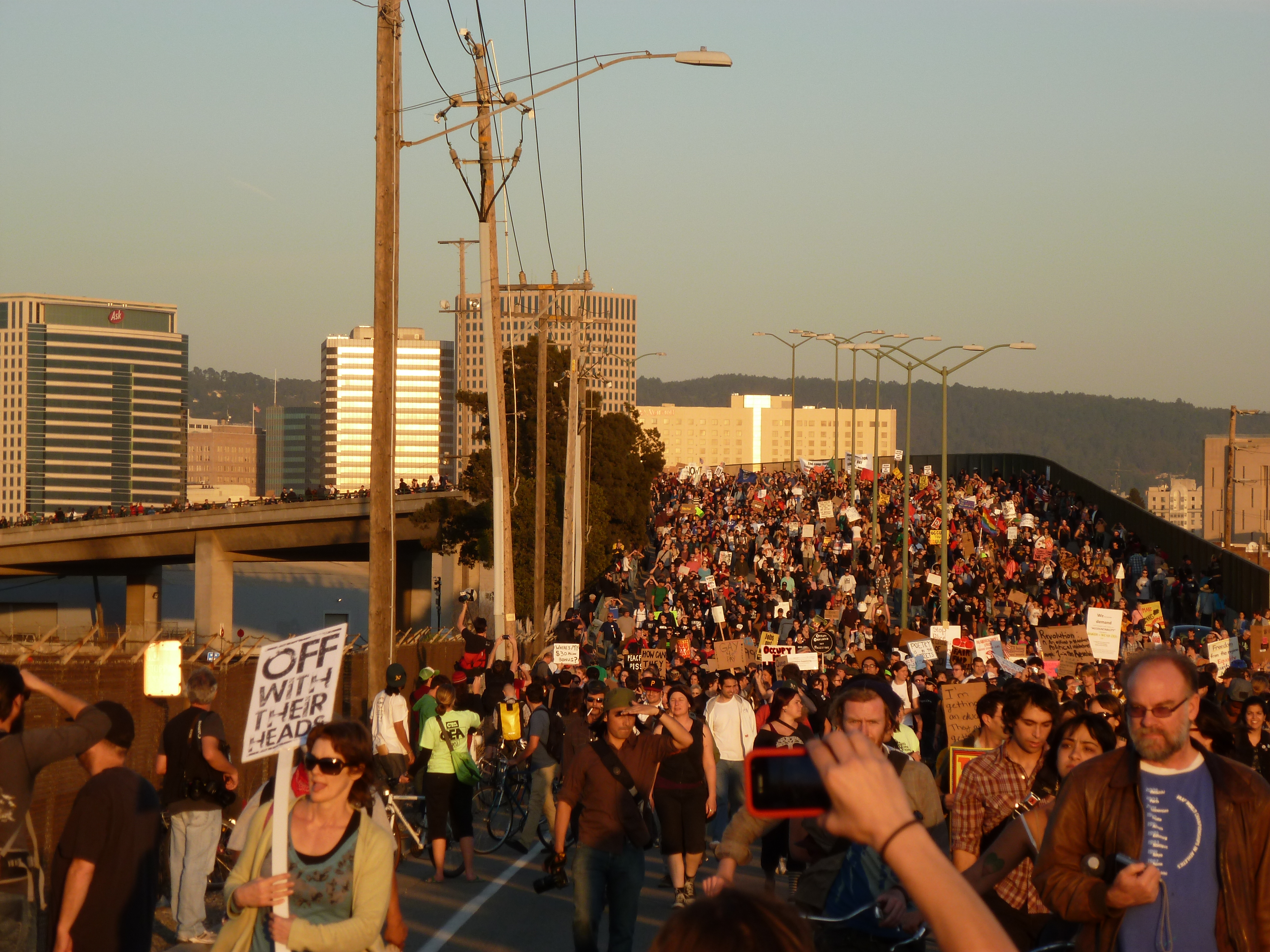
One of the marches to the Port of Oakland on November 2, 2011

The following is a timeline of Occupy Oakland (sometimes called OO or #OO) which began on Monday, October 10, 2011, as an occupation of Frank H. Ogawa Plaza located in front of Oakland City Hall in downtown Oakland, and is an ongoing demonstration. It is allied with Occupy Wall Street, which began in New York City on September 17, 2011, and is one of several "Occupy" protest sites in the San Francisco Bay Area. Other sites include Occupy San Francisco and Occupy San Jose.

Occupy Oakland was inspired by the Occupy movement, which in turn was inspired by the Arab Spring and Greek, Spanish, British, Chilean, and Israeli protest movements. A precursor in the United States was the 2011 Wisconsin protests occurring from late winter through the spring. More specific to Oakland, OO was inspired by local protest history, including protests in response to the BART Police shooting of Oscar Grant in 2009—2010.

== First occupation ==
- October 10, 2011 – Occupy Oakland began at 4 p.m. with a rally attended by hundreds of supporters, held in tandem with Indigenous People's Day, both as a statement of solidarity and an expression that this action firmly situated itself against colonialism and nation states. A couple dozen protesters set up tents that evening.
- October 14, 2011 – Protesters participated in a short march from Frank H. Ogawa Plaza to the Oakland Police headquarters and back.
- October 15, 2011 – Around 2,500 people, including actor Danny Glover, came out for a Saturday march and rally to show their support for Occupy Oakland.

External videos
- "Raw Video: Freed Hikers Visit Occupy Oakland." Compilation of scenes as Shane Bauer, Joshua Fattal and Sarah Shourd speak at Occupy Oakland.

- October 17, 2011 – On October 17, 2011, Sarah Shourd, Shane Bauer and Joshua Fattal — the three American hikers recently freed from an Iranian prison — made their first West Coast speaking appearance at Occupy Oakland, drawing an audience of around 300 people.
- October 18, 2011 – Snow Park camp is established with about two dozen people primarily because the Frank H. Ogawa Plaza site was running out of room.
- October 19, 2011 – The Alameda County Health Department visits the plaza on the pretext of "upholding public safety", specifically whether conditions were sanitary and whether rats that had previously been living in bushes in the park had been present in the encampment. No evidence was found of a rat problem within the camp. County representatives offered some recommendations but no aid.
- October 20, 2011 – The City of Oakland issued an official notice to the encampment citing "violence, assaults, threats and intimidation", among other complaints, and, forbidding lodging overnight. The demonstrators "appeared determined not to leave" and countered that "the rats, drug crimes, and violence in the area of 14th Street and Broadway went unchecked before they arrived." The grandnephew of labor leader and civil rights activist César Chávez got married at the protest site.
- October 22, 2011 – Protesters marched from Frank H. Ogawa Plaza to Snow Park. Some protesters entered a Chase Bank branch and ripped up hundreds of deposit slips and threw them in the air, while some protesters stayed to help clean up the deposit slips. After leaving Chase, they protested outside of a Wells Fargo branch before returning to Frank H. Ogawa Plaza.

== First raid and aftermath ==
- October 25, 2011 (5 AM – 6 AM) – Police officers in riot gear from various Bay Area law enforcement agencies cleared both Frank Ogawa Plaza and Snow Park in the morning resulting in over 102 arrests.

External videos
- "Raw Video: Protesters Clash With Oakland Police." Compilation of events as Oakland Police fire tear gas and arrest protesters marching through downtown Oakland en route to Frank Ogawa Plaza.

- October 25, 2011 (4 PM – 8 PM) – Hundreds of protesters and supporters gathered in front of the Oakland Public Library to march back to Frank H. Ogawa Plaza to reclaim the space. The march continued around the city for about two hours, and then moved in on the plaza. Police issued a dispersal order which failed to move the crowd, and fired tear gas, and beanbag rounds. Scott Olsen, a former Marine and Iraq War veteran, suffered a skull fracture caused by a shooting projectile that witnesses believed was a tear gas or smoke canister fired by the police.
- October 26, 2011 – More than a thousand protesters gathered peacefully at Frank H. Ogawa Plaza and held a general assembly in the plaza's amphitheater. They agreed to organize a general strike for November 2. The Oakland Police Department released a statement confirming the use of bean bag rounds.

== Plaza reoccupied ==
- October 27, 2011 – At least 1,000 protesters held a candlelight vigil for Scott Olsen at Frank Ogawa Plaza. The plaza was re-taken by protesters in the evening. Mayor Jean Quan issued a statement urging non-violence and asked that there be no overnight camping; however, the city did not take steps to prevent the re-occupation. Scott Olsen's medical status was upgraded from "critical" to "fair" by doctors at Highland Hospital, although surgery was still being considered in order to reduce pressure on his brain.
- October 28, 2011 – Documentary filmmaker Michael Moore spoke to a crowd of about 1,000 protesters. In the hour-long address, Michael Moore encouraged Occupy Oakland by saying, "We've killed despair across the country and we've killed apathy." Dozens of new tents were erected in the plaza, including a medical tent provided and staffed by the California Nurses Association. Pro-democracy protesters in Egypt marched from Cairo's Tahrir Square to the U.S. Embassy in solidarity with Occupy Oakland.
- October 30, 2011 – Wounded veteran Scott Olsen's roommate Keith Shannon reported that doctors expect Olsen to make a full recovery.
- October 31, 2011 – Representatives of Occupy Oakland held a press conference detailing plans for the general strike on November 2.
- November 1, 2011 – The Oakland Police Officer's Association issued an open letter to the citizens of Oakland expressing "confusion" about Mayor Quan's decision making. The open letter took issue with Mayor Quan's decision to allow public employees to participate in the upcoming general strike.

== November 2 general strike ==
- November 2, 2011 – Tens of thousands of protesters gathered at Frank Ogawa Plaza to participate in rallies, marches, and teach-ins designed to empower citizens and to draw attention to economic inequity and corporate greed as part of the 2011 Oakland general strike. Some estimate that the march to the Port of Oakland drew as much as 100,000 protesters. A small group vandalized a Whole Foods storefront, and broke windows and ATMs of Bank of America and Wells Fargo banks in the afternoon.

External videos
- "CA Violence: RT footage from 'occupied' Oakland" Compilation of events as Oakland police begin using tear gas to disperse crowds, while protesters retreat from the police line, treat those effected by gas, break windows at nearby businesses, or provide film interviews.

- November 2 (11 PM) – November 3 (1 AM) – Later in the evening, a group of protesters took over a vacant building that once served as the headquarters of the Traveler's Aid Society, a non-profit organization that provided services to the local homeless population. Police soon arrived to break up the protesters gathered outside of the building. Some protesters fled while others set a barricade on fire. Police used teargas and flash bangs to try to clear protesters. Clashes continued past midnight. 103 people were arrested. Scott Campbell was shot by police using a less-lethal round while he was filming a stationary line of police in riot gear. Kayvan Sabeghi was seriously injured while being arrested by police that evening.

== November 2011 ==
- November 3 – After 18 hours of being denied medical treatment while in police custody, Kayvan Sabeghi was transferred to Highland Hospital and put into the intensive care unit. Journalist Susie Cagle was arrested and subsequently reported having observed mistreatment of protesters during their imprisonment. The Oakland Metropolitan Chamber of Commerce issued a letter calling for the eviction of the protestors.
- November 4 – The Oakland City Council held a five-hour meeting to consider a resolution by council member Nancy Nadel in support of the Occupy Oakland encampment. The council heard over 100 people speak about the positives and negatives of Occupy Oakland. The vote on the resolution was postponed until the November 15 city council meeting.
- November 5 – A downtown Oakland Wells Fargo branch closed for business because of the roughly 100 immigrant rights protesters who marched from Occupy Oakland's encampment to protest the bank's connection to companies that run immigrant detention centers.
- November 7 – Occupy Oakland deposited $20,000 donated by Occupy Wall Street for urgent medical and legal expenses into Wells Fargo. The Occupy Oakland general assembly approved the decision to hold it temporarily in a Wells Fargo account so that it could begin being used immediately while the group waits on the state to finalize its status as an unincorporated association able to hold funds.

- November 9 – Five members of the Oakland City Council, two dozen clergy and some local small business owners held a press conference calling for the immediate eviction of Occupy Oakland. Occupy protesters interrupted Larry Reid's speech with chants. The council members and business owners responded with their own chants. Jean Quan held a meeting with the remaining protesters at Frank Ogawa Plaza. Occupy Oakland general assembly voted to "withdraw a resolution calling for future demonstrators to remain peaceful." Law enforcement attempted to evict the members of OccupyCal from their encampment on the UC Berkeley campus. Members of Occupy Oakland joined in the Berkeley protest.
- November 10 – A man was fatally shot near the Frank Ogawa Plaza encampment.
- November 11 – The Oakland Police Officers Association release an open letter to Occupy Oakland stating that "it is time to go home." Oakland Police issue eviction notices to the demonstrators at the tent encampment. Veterans march and rally in downtown Oakland against police brutality.
- November 13 – The November 10 shooting victim is identified. 25-year-old Kayode Ola Foster had been staying at Occupy Oakland in the days leading up to the shooting.

== Second raid ==
- November 14 – Hundreds of law enforcement officers clear the plaza for a second time. Mayor Jean Quan's city hall Legal Adviser, Dan Siegel and Oakland Deputy Mayor Sharon Cornu resign.
- November 21 - Police clear out final remaining Occupy Oakland encampment at Snow Park. The movement was left with no physical presence occupying any public space overnight in the city of Oakland.

== December 2011 ==
- December 12 - The Port of Oakland was again shut down as Occupy Oakland participated in a West Coast shutdown of ports.

== January 2012 ==
- January 28 - Over 400 arrests after Occupy Oakland announced plans to occupy a vacant building. Some protesters who escaped mass arrest entered City Hall, burned a flag and vandalized vending machines and an architectural model of City Hall.

== See also ==
Occupy articles
- List of global Occupy protest locations
- Occupy movement
- We are the 99%
- Timeline of Occupy Wall Street

Other U.S. protests

- 2009 Oakland riots
- 2011 United States public employee protests
- 2011 Wisconsin protests

Related articles

- Economic inequality
- Income inequality in the United States
- Lobbying
- Plutocracy
- Tea Party protests
- Wealth inequality in the United States
