= Reactions to the Occupy movement =

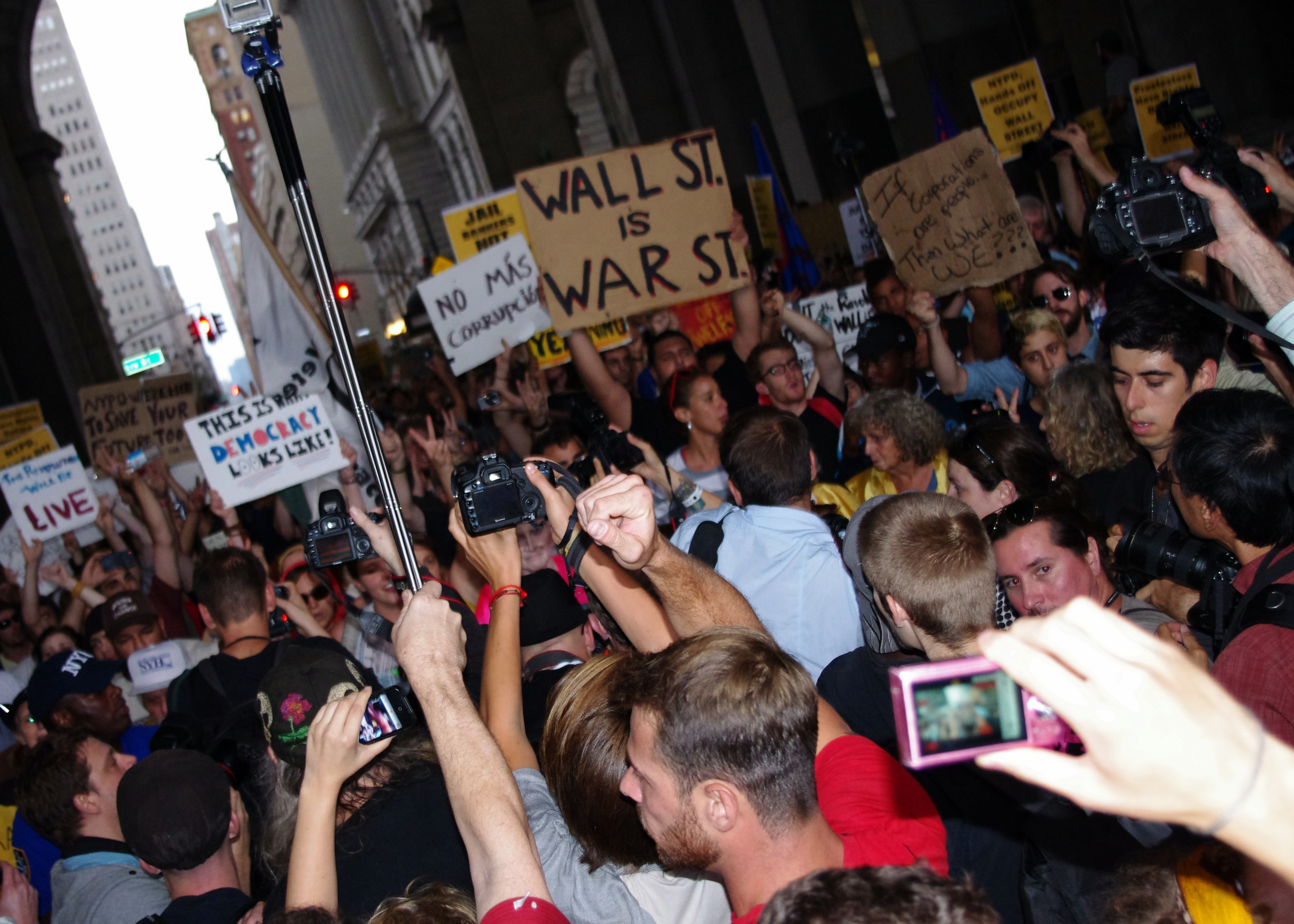
An Occupy Wall Street protest on September 30, 2011.

Since September 2011, the Occupy movement has spread to over 80 countries and 2,700 towns and cities, including in over 90 cities in the United States alone. The movement has generated reactions from the media, the general public, the United States government, and from international governments.

== International politicians ==
Brazil On 15 October 2011, President Dilma Rousseff said, "We agree with some of the expressions that some movements have used around the world [in] demonstrations like the ones we see in the US and other countries."

Canada On 15 October 2011, Finance Minister Jim Flaherty expressed sympathy with the protests, stating "There's growing worry about a lack of opportunities for the younger generation — particularly in the United States — and it's up to governments to ensure youth are able to capitalize on their education and find good jobs." He later commented, "I can understand some legitimate frustration arising out of that."

China In its 2012, May 25 "Human Rights Record of the United States in 2011, China consider the Occupy movement's repression as a sign of US abuse on its population, and denial of freedom of speech.

Greece Former Greek Prime Minister George Papandreou supported the protests, saying ""We fight for changing the global economic system, like many anti-Wall Street citizens who rightly protest against the inequalities and injustices of the system."

India On 19 October 2011, Manmohan Singh, Prime Minister of India, described the protests as "a warning for all those who are in charge of the processes of governance".

Iran On 12 October 2011, Supreme Leader Ali Khamenei voiced his support for the Occupy Movement saying, "Ultimately, it will grow so that it will bring down the capitalist system and the West."

United Kingdom On 21 October 2011, former Prime Minister Gordon Brown said the protests were about fairness. "There are voices in the middle who say, 'Look, we can build a better financial system that is more sustainable, that is based on a better and proportionate sense of what's just and fair and where people don't take reckless risks or, if they do, they're penalized for doing so.' " On 6 November 2011, Opposition leader Ed Miliband: "The challenge is that they reflect a crisis of concern for millions of people about the biggest issue of our time: the gap between their values and the way our country is run." He mentioned that he is "determined that mainstream politics, and the Labour Party in particular, speaks to that crisis and rises to the challenge".

On Saturday 26 November 2011, Edinburgh City Council set a worldwide precedent by voting in favour of the motion to support the aims and sentiments of Occupy Edinburgh and the Occupy Movement as a whole. This motion was presented by the Scottish Green Party, was seconded by the Scottish Labour Party and was slightly amended by the SNP and LibDems. The only party not to back the motion was the Conservatives. "We regard this as a fantastic step forward in the opening of dialogue with the Scottish government.", stated Occupy Edinburgh.

United States On 16 October 2011, President Barack Obama spoke in support of the movement, but also asked protesters not to "demonize" finance workers. Local authorities in the United States have collaborated to develop strategies to respond to the Occupy movement and its encampments, and political leaders in eighteen United States cities consulted on cracking down on the Occupy movement, according to Oakland Mayor Jean Quan, who participated in a conference call. Within a span of less than 24 hours, municipal authorities in Denver, Salt Lake City, Portland, Oakland and New York City sent in police to crack down on the encampments of the Occupy movement. In February 2012, former President Jimmy Carter described the movement as "relatively successful" due to the way it had raised the profile of economic inequality.

Venezuela Venezuelan President Hugo Chávez condemned the "horrible repression" of the activists and expressed solidarity with the movement.

== Media ==
An article in the centre-left Labour Party-affiliated British magazine Progress published on 25 November criticised the Occupy protesters as representing "an unpalatable smorgasbord of religious, political and cultural ideas."

The Korean Central News Agency of North Korea (the state press) has described the Occupy movement as being "in protest against exploitation and oppression by capital, shaking all fabrics of society." Xinhua, China's state news agency, said the protests had exposed "fundamental problems" with the US economic and political systems, and that it showed "a clear need for Washington, which habitually rushes to demand other governments to change when there are popular protests in their countries, to put its own house in order." Commentator Keith Olbermann criticized major news outlets for not covering the Occupy movement more in-depth.

In November, Jeffery Sachs argued that the Occupy movement marks the start of a new progressive age.

On 16th Jan 2012, Kevin Powell argued the Occupy best embodied the spirit of Martin Luther King's campaigning against inequality. Also in January, Financial Times commentator Philip Stephens suggested that the global Occupy movement, with its many strands, still does not present a coherent plan for political change.

== Public opinion ==
In the US, public support for the Occupy movement appeared to decline slightly from October to December 2011. The approval and disapproval rate hovered around the 50 percent mark, according to national polls. A Public Policy Polling poll in November revealed that around 50 percent of participants supported the movement with 45 percent disapproving of it. However, in a November 2011 a USA Today/Gallup poll reveals that 6 in 10 Americans have no opinion or don't know enough on the Occupy movement's goals. In October 2011, a joint CBS/New York Times poll indicated that around 40 percent of people approved of the Occupy Wall Street movement, while 27 percent disagreed with the movement.

A global survey of 23 countries published by Ipsos on 20 January 2012 found that only about 40% of the worlds citizens were familiar with the movement. Over twice as many reported a favourable response to the movement compared to those who dislike it. Support for the movement varied markedly among countries, with South Korea(67%), Indonesia(65%) and India(64%) reporting the highest sympathy - while Australia (41%), Japan (41%) and Poland (37%) reporting the lowest.

However, a recent poll in January 2012 by CBS-owned KPIX-TV of San Francisco showed that support for Occupy protests in the San Francisco Bay Area is on the decline. The poll showed that 26% of residents who initially supported the movement now changed their mind. The poll includes Occupy Oakland, Occupy San Francisco, and Occupy San Jose.

== Other ==
Egyptian protesters from Tahrir Square have lent their support of the movement. A message of solidarity issued by a collective of Cairo-based protesters declared: "As the interests of government increasingly cater to the interests and comforts of private, transnational capital, our cities and homes have become progressively more abstract and violent places, subject to the casual ravages of the next economic development or urban renewal scheme. An entire generation across the globe has grown up realizing, rationally and emotionally, that we have no future in the current order of things."

In early December 2011, business magnate Richard Branson said the movement is a "good start", that they have been protesting for valid reasons and that if the business community takes some of their concerns on board they will have made a difference.

On 15 December, Jesse Jackson said that Jesus Christ, Mahatma Gandhi, and Martin Luther King Jr. were all occupiers, and that: "Occupy is a global spirit, which is now sweeping the nation and the world, fighting for justice for all of God's children". In February 2012, investment magnate Jeremy Grantham wrote in support of Occupy for the Financial Times, suggesting that the central message of the movement ought to be "more sensible assistance for the poor, more taxes for the rich".

In March 2012 America magazine's Gary Dorrien questions the movement's potential societal influence.
