= Justin Wedes =

American entrepreneur and activist

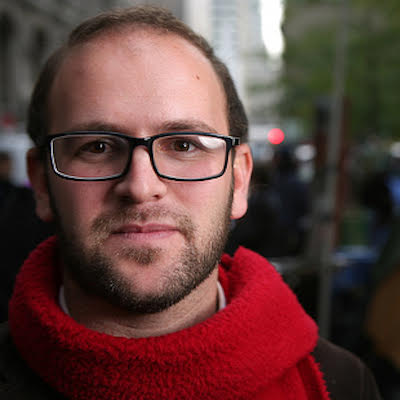
- Born: 20 March 1986 (age 40); Huntington Woods, Michigan, United States
- Education: University of Michigan and Pace University
- Occupations: Founder of the Liberati Group and Activist
- Website: justinwedes.com

Justin Wedes (born March 20, 1986) is an entrepreneur, community organizer and social justice activist. He is a former member of the Occupy Wall Street movement, founding member of the Detroit Water Brigade and CEO of The Liberati Group, a strategic communications firm, and Flow Video a production company specializing in Education and Non Profits.

== Early life and education ==
Justin Wedes was born in Huntington Woods, Michigan a suburb of Detroit. He attended Berkley High School, graduating class valedictorian in 2004.

Wedes graduated from the University of Michigan in 2008 with a Bachelor of Science in Physics and Linguistics with High Honors. From 2007 - 2008, Justin was an organizer with the Rural Migrant Outreach Program. Wedes continued his education from 2008 - 2010 at Pace University earning his Master of Education in Adolescent Science Education.

== Career and activism work ==
From 2008 - 2010, Justin Wedes was an educator with the New York City Department of Education, teaching truant and low-income youth in subjects ranging from science to media literacy. His work with high-risk youth was recognized with a Teachers Network Leadership Institute MetLife Fellowship. Wedes was forced to resign from that position when it was discovered he had forged his supervisor's signatures on documents.

Wedes helped co-found the US Uncut movement in 2009 and acted as Social Media Director, connecting networks of activists and social change-makers through the Internet and on the streets.

In July 2011 Wedes co-founded the New York City General Assembly (NYCGA), the group that organized Occupy Wall Street. Wedes was an organizer and unofficial spokesperson for the movement, appearing on The Colbert Report with Stephen Colbert in October, 2011. In 2012, Wedes accepted the Activism Award at the Shorty Awards on behalf of the Twitter @OccupyWallStreetNYC "Tweetboat" social media team. In 2012 Wedes received the Labor Communicator of the Year Award from the Metro NY Labor Communications Council.

Wedes was an Organizer and Volunteer Coordinator of the Occupy Sandy movement from 2012 - 2013.

After the closing of the Paul Robeson High School for Business and Technology in 2011, Wedes co-founded the Paul Robeson Freedom School in Brooklyn, NY in 2012 with an emphasis on social justice and building community resilience. For this work, he and his partner received the 2013 United National Humanitarian Peacekeeping Award at the United Nations International Day of Peace.

From June 2014 - May 2015 Wedes served as head organizer of the Detroit Water Brigade, helping lead the humanitarian and advocacy response to Detroit's municipal water shutoff program. This non-profit advocacy group provided rapid relief to thousands of families without running water and, in coalition with other local groups, participated in blockades that temporarily shut down the program. In response, the city of Detroit implemented a temporary moratorium on water shutoffs and a host of reforms making water more affordable for low-income residents.

Wedes founded the Liberati Group in May 2015, a strategic media consulting firm.

Wedes serves as a board member at Bethel Community Transformation Center, a non-profit that works to renovate a former Detroit Jewish synagogue and serve as an inter-faith community center for community empowerment and reconciliation.

In February 2016, Wedes testified to the United Nations in New York City urging them to investigate the Flint water crisis. Wedes currently owns Flow Videos startup production company, specializing in Education videos, with offices in Detroit and New Jersey.

== Controversy ==
In 2011, Justin Wedes was given the choice to either resign or be fired from his position as a high school teacher in Brooklyn, New York, after he was found to have committed forgery and fraud. Justin did so by copying his supervisor's signature and pasting it onto grant applications totalling $4,725. When first confronted, Wedes responded by saying "I don't want to talk about it now." and requested legal counsil. He then later tried to justify his actions by saying his supervisor "...probably would have signed them anyways." This controversy effectively ended Justin's teaching career.

In August 2014, Justin Wedes changed the password of the collectively managed @OccupyWallStNYC "Tweetboat" social media account. In response, the rest of the collective wrote a statement denouncing his actions. Wedes responded with his version on his private blog. In September 2014, a group of Occupy Wall Street organizers filed suit against Wedes in NY State Supreme Court in Manhattan, accusing him of censoring them from the use of an OWS Twitter account they claimed ownership of. The lawsuit was ultimately terminated in January, 2015.

== Published works ==
- "Occupy Wall Street, two years on: we're still the 99%" — The Guardian
- "The Cathie Black fiasco: Lessons for confronting entrenched power"
- "Why Paul Robeson would have walked out of Paul Robeson High School"
