= Occupy Rochester NY =

Protest group against economic inequality

Occupy Rochester NY was a collaboration that has included an Occupy movement encampment in Washington Square Park in Rochester, New York. The occupiers were initially given citations and arrested for violating park regulations. On November 10, 2011, however, they reached agreement with the city to camp in the south half of the park until mid January 2012. The agreement was due to the work between Ryan Acuff, and John Smigle. Note that there is also a separate Occupy Rochester MN.

As of June 2012, Occupy Rochester (NY) had continued to engage in organized meetings, events and actions.

== Local causes ==
In addition to the encampment, they have been active in other local causes. These include:

- Helping a family, Harold and Maria Steidel, get a moratorium on their home foreclosure.
- Protesting the closing of a local school, school #6.

== See also ==
Occupy articles

- List of global Occupy protest locations
- Occupy movement
- Timeline of Occupy Wall Street
- We are the 99%

Other Protests

- 15 October 2011 global protests
- 2011 United States public employee protests
- 2011 Wisconsin protests

Related articles

- Arab Spring
- Corruption Perceptions Index
- Economic inequality
- Grassroots movement
- Income inequality in the United States
- Plutocracy
- Protest
- Tea Party protests
- Wealth inequality in the United States
