= Jesse LaGreca =

American blogger, protester and activist

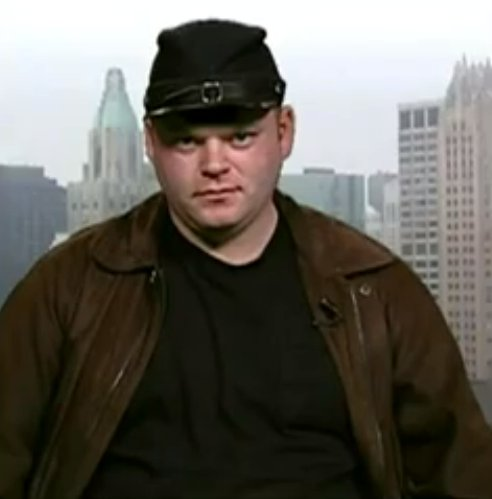
Jesse LaGreca in 2012

Jesse LaGreca is an American blogger, protester and activist who became a de facto speaker on behalf of the 2011 Occupy Wall Street movement.

== Background ==
LaGreca received online attention after an unaired video interview by Fox News media showed him "dressing-down" Fox News, became available on the internet.

== Political position ==
His political views include objections to media bias, pro-national health care, income inequality and Wall street accountability and regulation messages. He has denounced both Republican and Democratic Parties as too sensitive to corporates' voices, de facto reducing citizens' voices weight, and being problematic for American democracy, saying: "The lobbyists have enormous power, and they've shut out a lot of the voice of the American people". For LaGreca, the purpose of OWS is first to open the discussion about the American economic and political crisis, raising awareness about the structural flaws affecting it, then only some solutions may be suggested. LaGreca gave numerous interviews across the US to explain OWS' position, his activism is now supported by citizen donations.

== See also ==
- Occupy Wall Street
