= Occupy Sandy =

2012 organized relief effort

- An Occupy Sandy directional sign in Far Rockaway, Queens.
- Formation: 2012, New York City, New York, United States
- Purpose: Disaster relief, mutual aid
- Budget: $874,039 (2013)
- Volunteers: 60,000 (November 21, 2012)
- Website: www.occupysandy.net

Occupy Sandy was an organized relief effort created to assist the victims of Hurricane Sandy in the northeastern United States. Like other Occupy Movement offshoots, such as Occupy Our Homes, Occupy University, Occupy the SEC, and Rolling Jubilee, Occupy Sandy was made up of former and present Occupy Wall Street protesters, other members of the Occupy movement, and former non-Occupy volunteers. The effort worked in partnership with many local community organizations in New York City and New Jersey and has focused on mutual aid in affected communities rather than charity, and long-term rebuilding for more robust, sustainable neighborhoods.

== Background and history ==
The Occupy Wall Street organization and the Occupy movement in general began in New York's Zuccotti Park in 2011, where a number of protesters grouped together to change "the public discourse about economic inequality" and created the idea of the 1%'ers versus the 99%'ers. After the breakup of the group in the park and elsewhere, the Occupy movement has focused on "more intellectual, less visible projects, like Occupy Farms, fighting debt and theorizing on banking". The movement's connections and "altruistic drive" has led to them being somewhat more effective in the Hurricane Sandy relief movement than "larger, more established charity groups".

The coordinators of the Occupy Sandy relief effort have been working in conjunction with supply distributors, such as the Red Cross and the Federal Emergency Management Agency, while relying on the National Guard for security. There has also been some collaboration with the office of Michael Bloomberg, New York City Mayor, and the rest of the New York City government, though past interactions between Occupy Wall Street members and the city government has caused the Occupy Sandy relationship to be "tenuous".

== Organization ==
=== Sandy aid distribution hubs ===
As the storm was still making landfall an email was sent the Occupy Faith Email Listserve requesting locations for possible disaster response & resource distribution locations.

After the destruction resulting from Hurricane Sandy, members of Occupy Sandy set up two distribution sites in Brooklyn at the borough's Church of St. Luke and St. Matthew and St. Jacobi Evangelical Lutheran Church for New Yorkers to collect clothes, blankets and food.

The initial "Occupy motor pool" ride share was formed to help get members more readily into the areas affected by the storm at Jacobi Church. These members include "construction teams and medical committees", as well as weather being forecast by an Occupy weatherman. The effort has since spread to several more distribution hubs that filter received aid to the worst of the affected areas, such as Coney Island, Staten Island, Rockaways (Queens), Sheepshead Bay (Brooklyn), and the Jersey shore.

The Sandy Aid distribution Hub nicknamed 520 Clinton located in Clinton Hill's Church of St. Luke and St. Matthew being the largest of locations mobilized for the effort demonstrated many of the Occupy Mutual Aid values and projects side by side that were once on display at Zuccotti Park in 2011. The church was set a blaze by unknown individuals on Christmas even causing extensive fire & smoke damage. With the forced closure of the location all Sandy Aid operations moved to the affected areas, effectively decentralizing the efforts.

Occupy Sandy only operated their own hubs, and actively supported and cultivated the creation of neighbor-run locations. Midland Avenue Neighborhood Relief & Cedar Grove Community Hub were both run by longtime New York residents and provided 24-hour support through the first winter post-Sandy.

=== Online collaboration ===
Occupy Sandy's online presence is coordinated through a website organized and run by members of InterOccupy and OWS Tech Ops. Social networking sites, such as Facebook and Twitter, have been used extensively by Occupy Sandy members to inform others involved in the relief effort and elsewhere on what supplies and assistance are needed in which parts of the affected areas.

After comparison of websites, a wedding registry was created on Amazon.com to list items and materials needed in the relief effort, allowing people in the US and the rest of the world to donate goods. As of January 25, 2013, more than $717,900 has been spent on the items in the registry. Amazon.com has not been cooperative with Occupy Sandy to give the group for specific details about the numbers.

A local business registry was created modeling similar concepts to the Amazon relief item registry but putting 100% of the funds raised for needed tools, materials and goods directly in the hands of locally owned businesses in the areas hit hardest by Superstorm Sandy. The items purchased from the Occupy Sandy Local Business Registry were delivered directly from local stores to affected neighbors through the Staten Island Tool Lending Library.

=== Long-term mutual aid projects ===
From its start mutual aid principles were worked into the volunteer skill share orientations and in the participation of its members with the affected communities encouraged the creation of small projects, co-ops, and neighbor-led efforts.

Placing a focus on individuals becoming empowered, Occupy Sandy was able to encourage a culture of innovation & social business incubation in the hardest hit areas. The Brooklyn, Lower East Side, Rockaways and the Staten Island Long Term Recovery Organizations all were facilitated by Occupy volunteers using NY General Assembly-style meeting tools including the Occupy hand signals.

Their work through the Occupy Sandy Project Spokes Council provided large grants using a participatory budgeting frame work to the affected communities and fostered grassroots micro local projects such as Respond & Rebuild, Staten Island Tool Library, The People's Recovery Summit, Feeding Families Community Garden, Midland Avenue Neighborhood Relief, The May Edwards Chinn Memorial Food Pantry & Clinic, Hart & Soul and a citywide network of home cooks to supply the support hubs.

=== Mold removal and remediation ===
Due to the unique circumstances of the combination of ocean tidal surge during Sandy and the type of low income bungalow homes affected, extensive education and community outreach had to be done about proper mold remediation. Canvassing, mold skill shares, volunteer mold removal was offered as a first response by Occupy Sandy. Without any national certification, education, or accurate information available Occupy Sandy coordinators had to become self-taught experts in the subject.
