= Occupy OC =

Protest group against economic inequality

Occupy Orange County is a Southern California chapter of the Occupy movement, which began with a rally of over 1,000 people at Irvine City Hall on October 15, 2011. Occupy OC has helped victims of what they called "fraudclosure" to delay their evictions. Members regularly protest political fundraisers, for example as the satirical "Billionaires for Romney."

== History ==
Occupy Orange County was formed by fusing several smaller Occupy movements that had rallied in cities like Santa Ana, Huntington Beach, Costa Mesa, and Orange.

=== Chronology of events ===
On October 25, after the longest public comments session in city history, the Irvine City Council unanimously changed their positions and granted the movement permission to set up tents and camp on the civic center's lawn, establishing a "protest village" for over two months, which featured speakers, music, movie nights and constant free potluck meals.

On January 20 the movement held an "Occupy the Courts" protest on the anniversary of the decision in Citizens United v. FEC at the county's courts in Santa Ana, and then later participated in the December blockade of the Port of Long Beach and February shutdown of the Walmart distribution center in Mira Loma.

In late January the "protest village" moved to Fullerton, where the movement succeeded in getting two of its proposals passed by the Fullerton City Council, one requiring the city to move its money from large banks to local credit unions, and the other regulating credit card marketing to students.

Members worked with the allied group Occupy Santa Ana in April to contest the citations and arrests of local homeless for "camping" by forming "Necessity Village," a week long sleeping protest at Santa Ana Civic Center.

In July 2012, Occupy OC members documented Anaheim police shooting and protests, and arranged non-violent resistance training for protesters.

In the Summer of 2012, Occupy OC met other local political groups from the Tea Party, Libertarian and Green movements and began work on a joint statement of agreements between all the movements.

On July 4, 2013 Occupy OC led the OC branch of the Restore The Fourth national protests for privacy in the light of leaks about NSA abuses by Edward Snowden. Nearly 100 protesters demonstrated and marched at the Huntington Beach Fourth of July parade.
