= Strike Debt =

Debt resistance collective

Strike Debt is a decentralized debt resistance collective. Formed as an offshoot from Occupy Wall Street and the Occupy movement, it is similar to Occupy Sandy in practicing "mutual aid as direct action". In 2012, they published the Debt Resistors Operations Manual.

== Rolling Jubilee ==
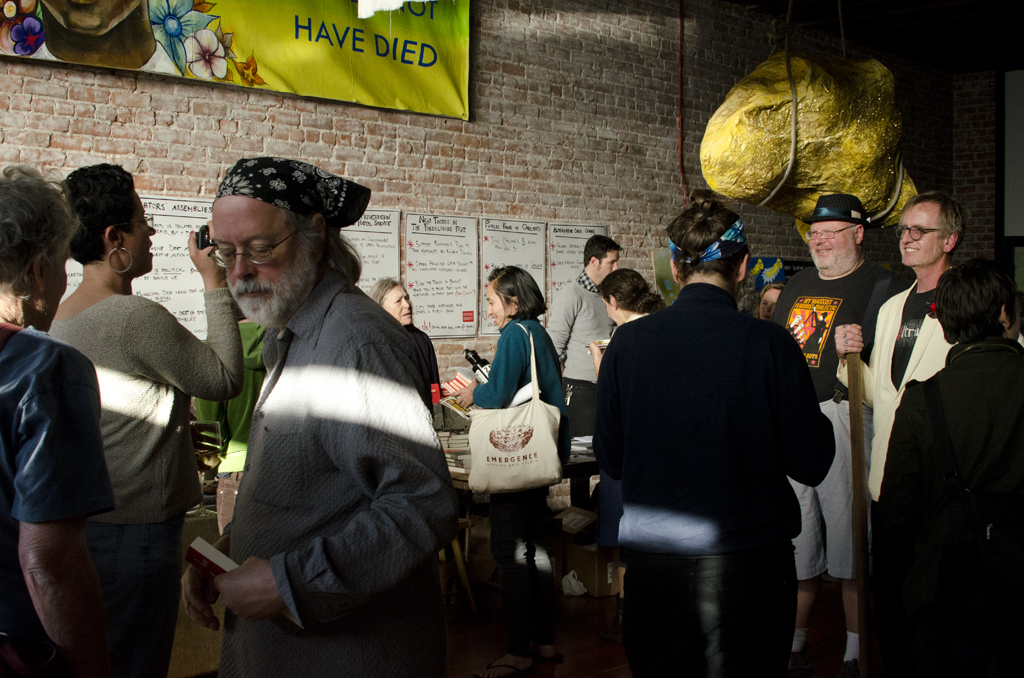
Bay Area Strike Debt's 2014 launch party for a new Debt Resisters' Operations Manual edition

Rolling Jubilee is a Strike Debt initiative that purchases and forgives monetary debt on the secondary market. Bank loans deemed unlikely to be repaid are reclassified as risky. Banks looking to recuperate the debt's little outstanding worth resell these portfolios on the secondary market at a fraction of their original worth. This type of high-risk debt is normally purchased by debt collectors who believe they can recover more from the loan than the banks could. The Rolling Jubilee, however, using crowdfunded donations and telethons, buys the debt to forgive it. The ideological impetus for the scheme came from Debt: The First 5,000 Years, in which the anthropologist David Graeber advocates for a biblical-style Jubilee absolution of debt. While Strike Debt's debt forgiveness is not meant to solve the structural inequalities of indebtedness, its organizers intend for the symbolism of their actions to remind the public of the morality of debt, its ability to be addressed, and its worth far below its listed price.

The group started with $500 to erase $14,000 of debt in November 2012, when the project went viral. The next month, they erased $100,000 of medical debt for 44 upstate New Yorkers. Each recipient was notified through a red, wrapped package, approximating a Christmas gift. Strike Debt received about $700,000 in donations from supporters between November 2012 and December 2013, after which they stopped collecting donations. From this total, they used $400,000 to purchase $13.5 million of medical debt from nearly 2,700 debtors and $1.2 million of other personal debt. Strike Debt purchased the debt at a 50-to-1 ratio with no additional details on the debtors apart from their addresses, to which they mailed a letter explaining the project and that the debt was now canceled. The group turned to focus on student loans next.

After being shut out by major student loan servicer Navient, Strike Debt targeted Corinthian Colleges, a for-profit institution affiliated with predatory lending practices. In September 2014, the Rolling Jubilee absolved $3.8 million in private student loans for 2,700 students of Corinthian's Everest College.

The anti-capitalist group both encourages the breakdown of current debt dogma and acknowledges the smallness of their role within larger debt structures. Strike Debt perceives its Rolling Jubilee as a public education campaign to "build a national debtors' movement" and showcase the effects of predatory debt on communities and people. It wants to encourage debt erasure as a public policy practice and to erase the stigma behind defaulting. To this end, the group wants those reached by the jubilee to pay it forward such that their contributions will help the jubilee reach others, such as those that Strike Debt encourages to default.

In Raritan, Eli Cook praised the plan's elegance and subversiveness. Conservative pundits, including a Fortune contributor, also affirmed its brilliance. Meanwhile, criticism within the movement asked whether this form of relief constituted political action, considering how recipients often did not view the gesture as political.

== The Debt Collective ==
The Debt Collective is a union of student debt strikers. Announced in late 2014, this Strike Debt initiative began as a platform for debtor organization and advocacy. The collective is looking to create an economic identity common to student debtors, undo the normalized expectations for college students to enter debt, and weaken the moral expectations around repaying debt ultimately worth pennies on the dollar. Ultimately, the Debt Collective plans to advocate for free education and the abolition of student loans. Some of the Debt Collective's difficulties include debtors' own perception that student loans are elective, that there is no common enemy, and that many debtors have disparate, chaotic lives. Strike Debt had unsuccessfully attempted a similar approach in 2012, to get one million student debtors to default as a statement.

The group supported the "Corinthian 15" students who sought full debt relief as their school, the for-profit Corinthian Colleges, was being dismantled while under multiple investigations and lawsuits. Following Corinthian's 2015 bankruptcy, the Debt Collective helped students file thousands of loan forgiveness claims, exercising a U.S. Department of Education escape clause in which debtors misled by their college can ask for forgiveness.

During the COVID-19 pandemic, the collective organized 1,600 debtors to strike, deferring their loan payments, with the hope that mass financial civil disobedience would lead to debt relief and cancellation.

== See Also ==
- Jubilee 2000
- Jubilee USA Network
