= Occupy Charlottesville =

Social movement in Charlottesville, Virginia

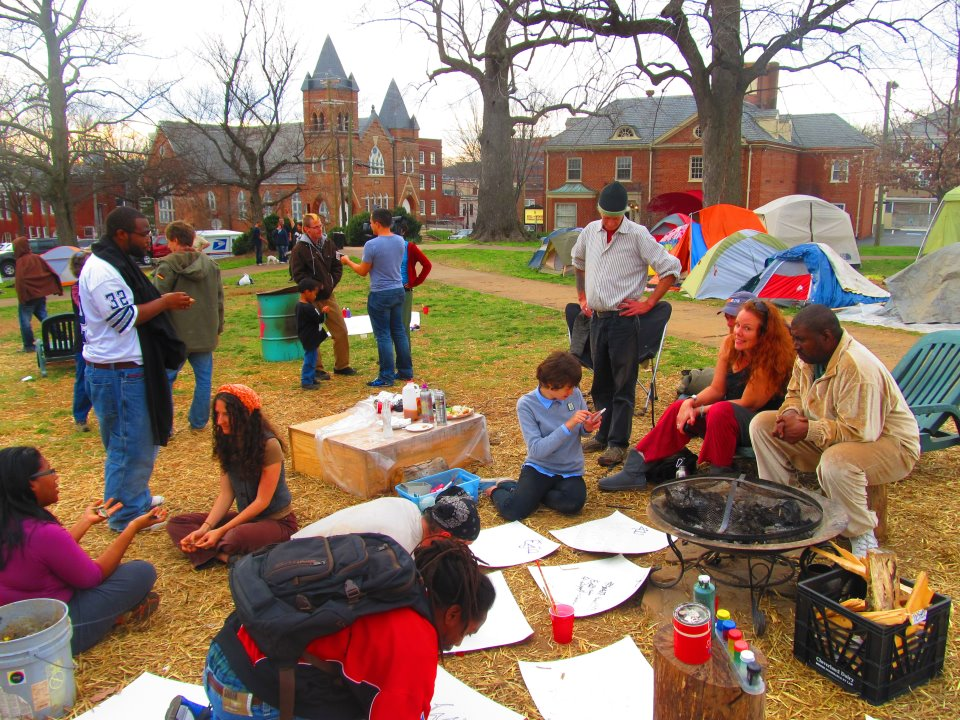
Occupy Charlottesville members

Occupy Charlottesville was a social movement in Charlottesville, Virginia, United States, that began on October 15, 2011, in solidarity with Occupy Wall Street and the rest of the Occupy movement. The downtown Lee Park encampment was taken down on November 30, 2011, when 18 members of the movement were arrested and charged with trespassing. The group failed to establish a campsite after the eviction, although they continued to hold their 'General Assemblies' and participate in targeted actions for several months thereafter. The group's protests target social and economic injustice both locally and nationally.

Although the group's website is still online, there have not been any 'Occupy' events in Charlottesville since February 2012.

== Background ==
The Occupy Wall Street movement began on September 17, 2011, as a protest against economic and social injustice. Soon thereafter, autonomous satellite protests sprung up across the world, most of them in the United States. In the weeks leading up to the October 15 occupation in Charlottesville, protesters first met at Random Row books on October 5 and again on October 12, for the first Official General Assembly. Among other topics, "they discussed and developed a set of shared values for community members, including social and economic justice, mutual respect, cooperation and non-violence with each other". The occupiers chose to take Lee Park, a public park in the north downtown neighborhood.

== Chronology ==
Several meetings in the first half of October lead up to Occupy Charlottesville's first action, which was a march from McGuffey Park (a few blocks away from the group's eventual campsite) to protest at a luncheon for the University of Virginia's corporate sponsors, hosted by the university's President, Teresa A. Sullivan. Later that night, the campsite was established in Lee Park. This physical presence lasted until the Charlottesville Police Department broke the encampment on November 30, 2011. The group remains active and continues to organize actions, as well as joining long-existing groups in actions of their own.

=== Weeks 1 through 5 ===
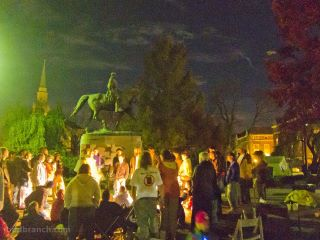
Occupy Charlottesville gathered at one of their General Assemblies

Charlottesville City officials granted the group a three-day overnight permit on October 18, 2011. On October 26, the City Parks and Recreation Director, Brian Daly, granted the protesters an automatic permit renewal for the next 30 days, provided no problems arose. On November 1, three homeless men were arrested in Lee Park for various alcohol infractions, while two underage girls were taken to the hospital with "signs of alcohol consumption". Charlottesville Police Lt. Ronnie Roberts reported that the men were "some of [their] area homeless that [they're] pretty familiar with", and that the men were "not with Occupy Charlottesville". After the incident, City spokesman Rick Barrick said, "To date we have had nothing but cooperation from those in Lee Park who identify themselves as being part of Occupy Charlottesville."

Some members of the community, notably Carole Thorpe as chairwoman of the Jefferson Area Tea Party, called for an end to the encampment. Mrs. Thorpe argued that City Council (an all-Democrat body) was making politically preferential accommodations and exceptions to the group which were unfair. She warned that the encampment would end badly and reflect poorly on the city and on City Council itself. Charlottesville City Council expressed no intention of disbanding the encampment before the permit expired on Thanksgiving Day. City Councilor Kristin Szakos expressed her belief "that it's a First Amendment issue ... And I think the First Amendment isn't limited to certain times of the day', while then-Mayor Dave Norris proposed "a community discussion about turning a neighborhood park into a "24/7 free-speech zone"."

=== November 21 appeal to city council ===
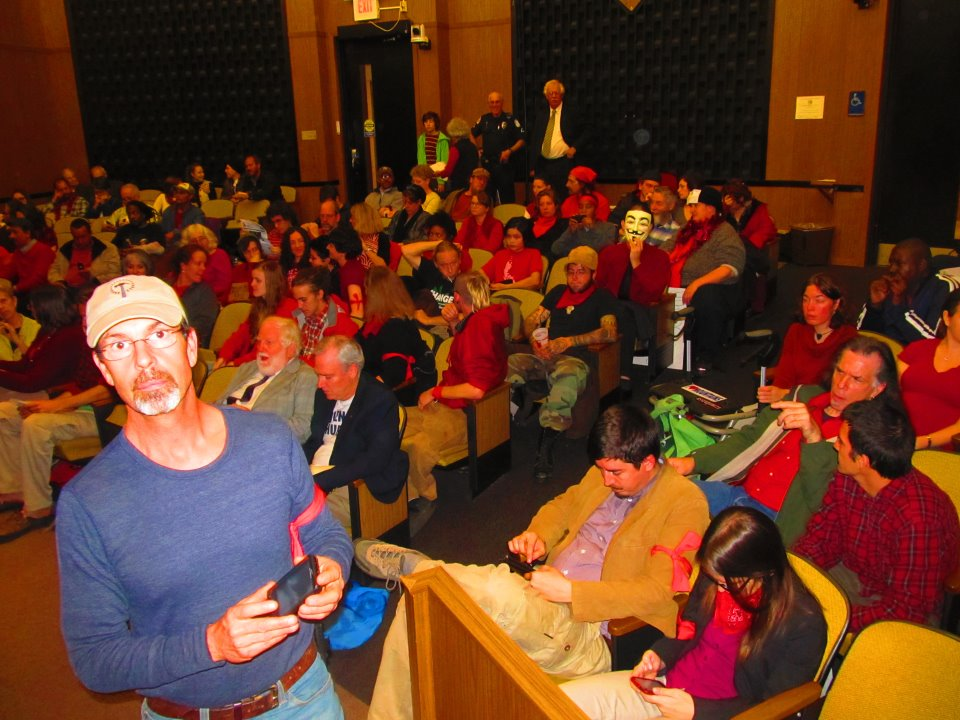
Occupy Charlottesville packs Charlottesville City Council chambers in what Councilor David Brown says is the best-attended meeting in his 8 years serving. Supporters wear red and almost 60 people ask the council to allow the encampment. A handful of those who speak on the issue ask for the council to start enforcing the 11 pm curfew in Lee Park.

On November 21, 2011, members of Occupy Charlottesville expressed their intention to continue the occupation to Charlottesville City Council. Many asked for the City to suspend the 11 pm curfew. Over 100 supporters packed the chambers in what Councilor David Brown called the best-attended meeting in his eight years on the board. An overflow room was opened for people who could not fit into the council chambers. About 60 people spoke to City Council regarding Occupy Charlottesville, a handful of them against its continued presence. Councilor response followed the public comments portion of the meeting. During this response portion of the meeting Councilor Szakos stated that she "[thinks] that free speech doesn't expire at 11 o'clock. It doesn't expire at Thanksgiving." Szakos was the sole councilor in favor of allowing the occupation to continue in Lee Park despite complaints by some members of the neighborhood. The rest of the council was in favor of the continuation of Occupy Charlottesville, albeit not in Lee Park. A desire was expressed to move the occupation to a new location, approved by the local city government. Mayor Dave Norris expressed his desire to find an alternative location for the occupiers other than a "neighborhood park". Although he expressed general support for the movement, he was resolved to end the Lee Park encampment.

I guess for me, the question is, is the movement stronger than this park? I think it is. I think it's clear that it is.

City spokesmen Ric Barrick sent out an email saying that Occupy Charlottesville would continue to receive 3-day permits for Lee Park until a suitable alternative location was found, and that no end date had been set for the city's thus-far tolerant stance toward the occupation.

=== Eviction ===
Despite the enthusiasm for the movement expressed at the November 21 City Council meeting an alternative location was not determined. City government opted to evict the protesters on November 30, 2011. After the 11:00 curfew came into effect, over 20 police officers moved in. Occupy supporters packed the sidewalk, City Council member Kristin Szakos among them. Eighteen arrests were made and sixteen of those arrested were taken to the Albemarle-Charlottesville Regional Jail while the other two were issued summons. One protester, Veronica Fitzhugh, was given an indecent exposure charge for running naked through the streets (in front of many children present) in addition to trespassing.

Protesters yelled obscenities at the police as they were removed from Lee Park.

The next night, occupiers met at the city's "Free Speech Wall", which had notices posted on it that camping would not be allowed.

Mayor Norris expressed displeasure with the spectacle, calling it the "death knell" for the group.

... The decision they made on Tuesday night ... a majority of them agreed to work with the city on finding another venue, but obviously a significant number decided to poke the city in the eye on the way out of Lee Park and provoke a confrontation with the city.

Szakos was displeased the city opted to remove and arrest the protesters. "I personally, as a councilor, feel very strongly that this is part of the speech that should be protected by the Constitution," Szakos said. "And I personally disagree with us ordering them out."

=== November 30 to present ===
Despite the enthusiasm for the movement expressed at the November 21 City Council meeting an alternative location was not determined. City government opted to evict the protesters on November 30, 2011.

On December 15, 2011 a single male protester was cited for impeding traffic during a march to commemorate two months since the inception of the occupation. Lt. Ronnie Roberts, of the CPD, said the group was large enough to block rush hour traffic on West Main Street.

On January 27, the Charlottesville General District Court found 17 of the 18 protesters who were arrested in November guilty of a Class 4 misdemeanor for trespassing. Each of the convicted protesters must pay a $100 fine plus court costs. The 18th protester, Mario Brown had pleaded guilty and been sentenced to community service in December. Veronica Fitzhugh, who stripped naked to read a statement during the eviction, had her indecent exposure charge dismissed, as the court considered her actions to be "political, rather than sexual in nature". Jeff Fogel, a National Lawyers Guild attorney who represented Occupy Charlottesville was dissatisfied with the verdict. He said ...

The Supreme Court has been clear that politics should play no role in determining who gets the right to speak and not to speak on the streets of our city.

== Allegations of police brutality ==
Two members of Occupy Charlottesville, Bailee Hampton and Shelly Stern, filed brutality complaints against the Charlottesville Police Department based on claims of police misconduct during their November 30 arrests. A police brutality probe was conducted by the CPD but they declined to release the results. Dave Norris, who was mayor when Occupy Charlottesville was evicted, said the current policy of the CPD is that they do not release information about disciplinary action. He added that he thought "it would probably serve the community well to at least provide some transparency in terms of the actions that may have taken place." However, Satyendra Huja, who had taken over Norris' job as mayor by the time the police brutality investigation was complete, felt that it was unnecessary for the police to release the results of their probe. He felt that since the Charlottesville Police Department did not take any action against its officers, the brutality complaints were baseless.

=== Impact ===
On June 3, 2012, Charlottesville City Council passed a resolution condemning the Supreme Court's decision in the case Citizens United vs. Federal Election Commission as harmful to the democratic process. Although the citizen-proposed resolution was not directly linked to Occupy Charlottesville, several key members of Occupy Charlottesville helped push the resolution and City Council.
