= Occupy the Hood =

POC-facing activist group

The logo of Occupy the Hood

The Occupy the Hood movement is a nationwide grassroots movement in the United States that is an extension of Occupy Wall Street and of the Occupy Movement generally. The movement started in response to how the Occupy Wall Street movement was developing after its initial encampment in Zuccotti Park. Occupy the Hood seeks to represent the interests of oppressed people and to bring people of color into the Occupy Movement. The movement has been especially active in its attempts to decolonize the Occupy Movement. Occupy the Hood was created by Malik Rhasaan, from Jamaica, Queens. Occupy the hood chapters exist in the U.S. cities of Atlanta, Boston, Indianapolis, Los Angeles, Milwaukee, New York City, New York, and other major metropolitan cities.

== History ==
The idea for creating Occupy the Hood began when Malik Rhasaan went to various internet discussion pages to discuss with people of color that the protesters at lower Manhattan’s Zuccotti Park were typically white. The name "Occupy the Hood" originated from a Twitter hashtag of the same name. Rhasaan learned that people of color who were interested in the protests did not participate due to feelings of disconnection with the Occupy movement. In October 2011, Rhasaan created an Occupy The Hood Facebook page to address a perceived "lack of racial diversity among OWS protesters" and to increase racial diversity among Occupy Wall Street protesters. Shortly thereafter, the Facebook page had almost 6,700 follower. At the time, Rhasaan began working with Ife Johari, a community activist based in Detroit, Michigan, to promote Occupy the Hood in additional U.S. cities. By the end of October 2011, at least five chapters of Occupy the Hood were created in major U.S. cities. Part of the movement's focus is to encourage people of color worldwide to become in the Occupy Wall Street movement and the various Occupy movement general assemblies that were occurring at the time in various cities.

== Activities ==
Leaders of Occupy the Hood stated in October 2011 that the movement served to address problems in the financial industry concerning misdeeds based upon racism. In October 2011, Johari Uhuru stated that the financial industry should consider capitalism as it may correlate to racism, and regarding the financial industry, stated that "They're gonna have a problem with people of color [getting involved]" if this analysis is not considered. In October 2011, organization leaders stated that the group wanted to be a part of the Occupy Wall Street movement, rather than being separate from the movement.

The Atlanta, Georgia chapter organized a program called "feed the hood," which serves over "500 homeless people in metro Atlanta." The Atlanta chapter also runs a chapter youth program, organizes "peace parties" and has a garden.

== National gathering ==
In July 2012, Occupy the Hood had a national gathering in Atlanta, Georgia that various national Occupy the Hood chapters attended. Part of the gathering focused upon black-on-black crime in Atlanta. Additional activities included seminars about legal rights during police encounters, violence in communities that are predominantly of color, and gardening, with a focus on urban sustainability. Shortly after the gathering, it was reported that Occupy the Hood serves to "highlight inequality and the voices of people of color and urban residents."
