= Timeline of Occupy Wall Street =

Order of events of the 2011 Occupy Wall Street movement

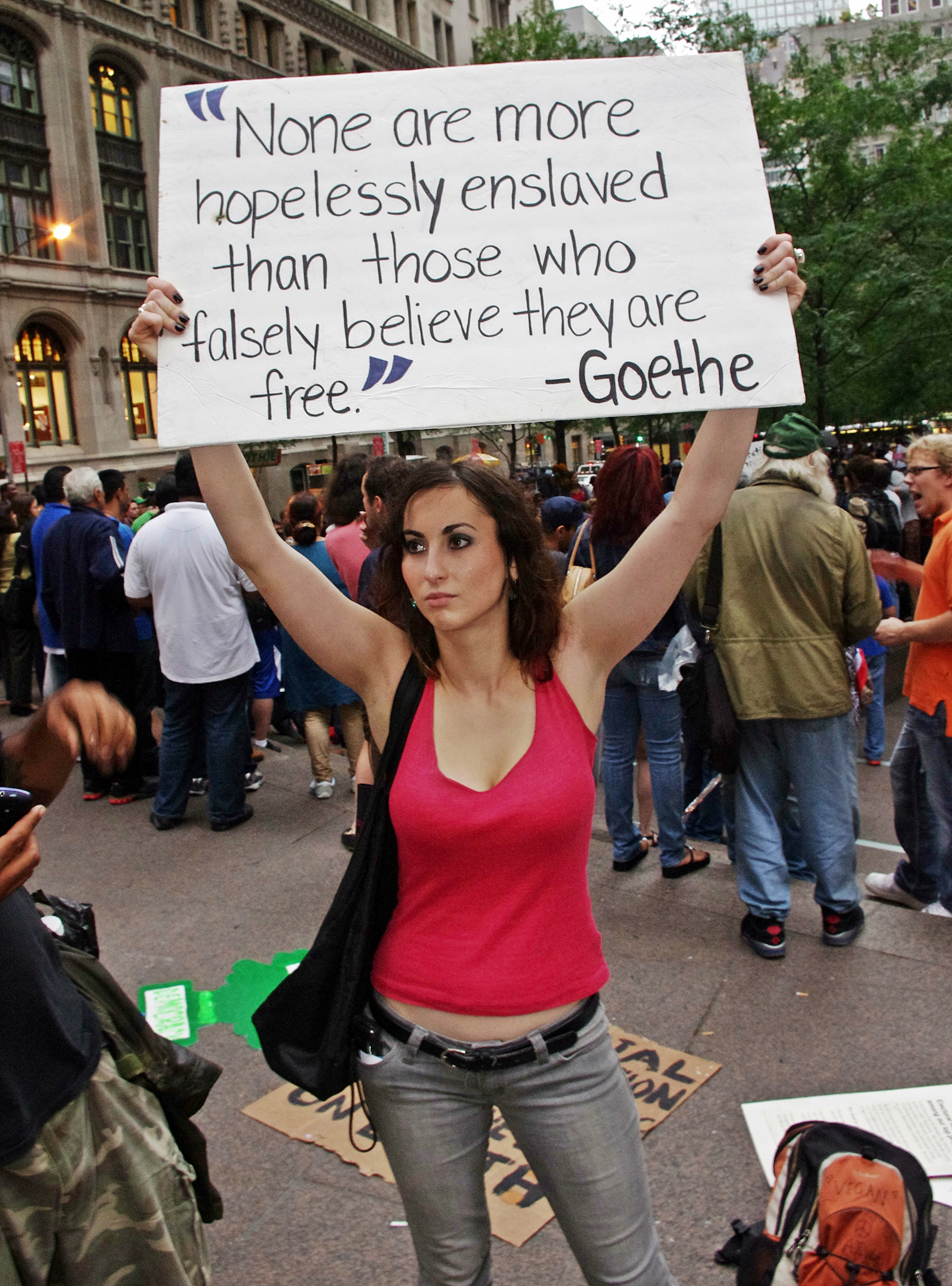
Protester on September 28, 2011

The following is a timeline of Occupy Wall Street (OWS), a protest which began on September 17, 2011 on Wall Street, the financial district of New York City and included the occupation of Zuccotti Park, where protesters established a permanent encampment. The Occupy movement splintered after NYC Mayor Bloomberg had police raid the encampment in Zuccotti Park on November 15, 2011. The timeline here is limited to this particular protest during this approximate time-frame (e.g., September 17 to November 15, 2011).

However, the chronology does encompass subsequent events if they are specific to both OWS and Zuccotti Park. After November 2011, various events and protests have continued at Zuccotti Park that claim to be associated with OWS. But permanent encampments, including extended protests and occupations of Zuccotti Park, are no longer permitted.

== Chronology of events ==
=== 2011 ===
==== Pre-Occupy Wall Street ====
- June 9 – Kalle Lasn from Adbusters (a Canadian anti-consumerist organization) registers the OccupyWallStreet.org web address.
- July 13 – Adbusters makes the initial proposal for a peaceful demonstration to occupy Wall Street.
- August 2 – with the "debt-ceiling deadline" of midnight August 2 drawing near (see: United States debt-ceiling crisis), a group calling itself "New Yorkers Against Budget Cuts" chose August 2 to incorporate a "General Assembly" with another group holding a strategy session for OWS. The two groups join in a demonstration at the Charging Bull sculpture, which stands in Bowling Green park in Lower Manhattan, at 4:30 p.m. Afterwards, these two groups "gather[ed] into working groups to plan for the September 17 event".
- August 9 – Dylan Ratigan criticizes US political-banking ties on MSNBC's The Dylan Ratigan Show.
- August 14 – Warren Buffett publishes the editorial "Stop Coddling the Super Rich" in the New York Times Op-Ed section.
- August 23 – The hacktivist group Anonymous encourages its followers to take part in the protest.

==== September 2011 ====
- September 3 – Former Labor Secretary Robert Reich publishes a long opinion article in The New York Times claiming that the productivity gains in the last 30 years have gone mostly to the top fifth of earners.

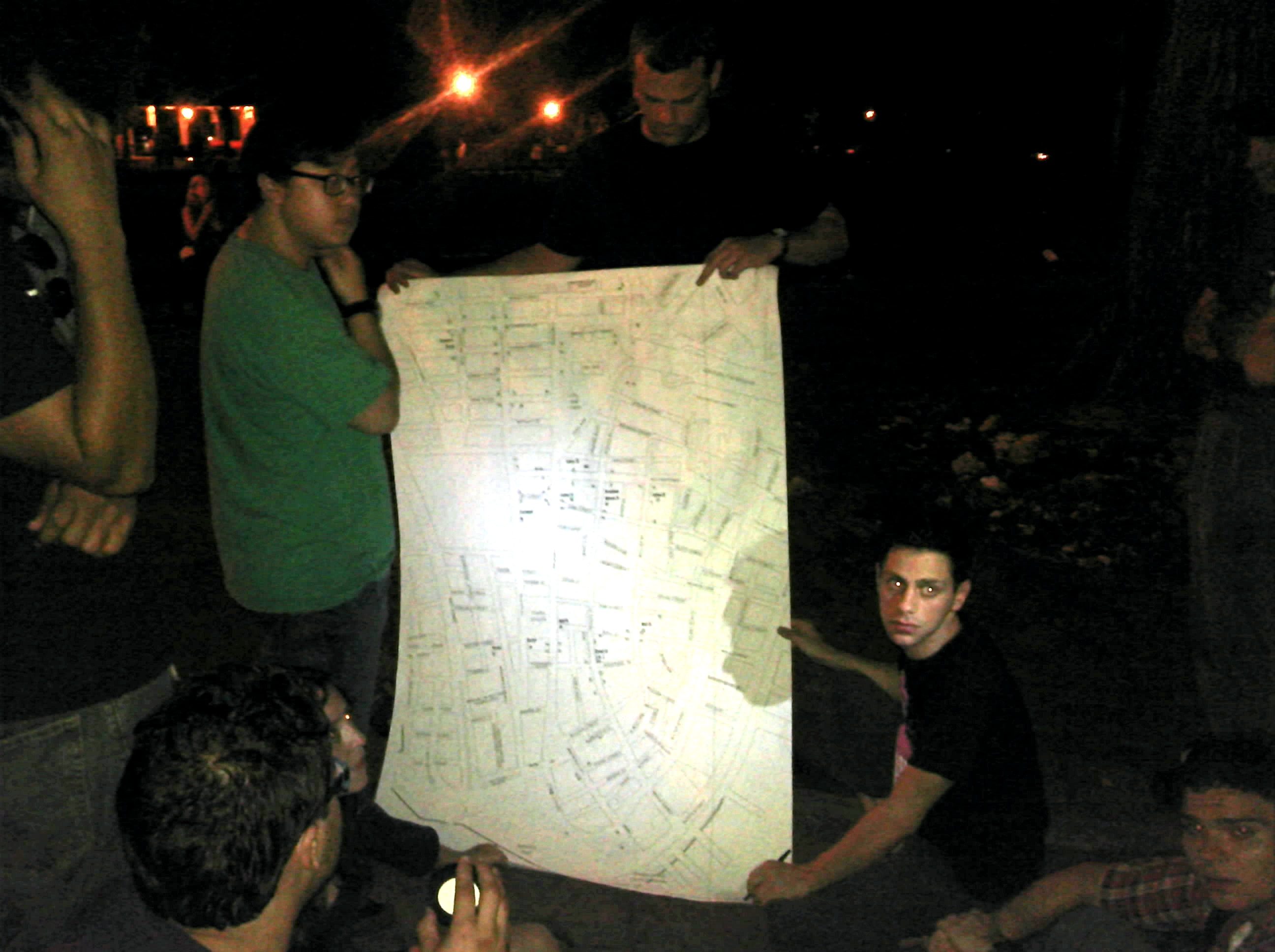
September 3, 2011: A planning session for Occupy Wall Street is held at night in Tompkins Square Park

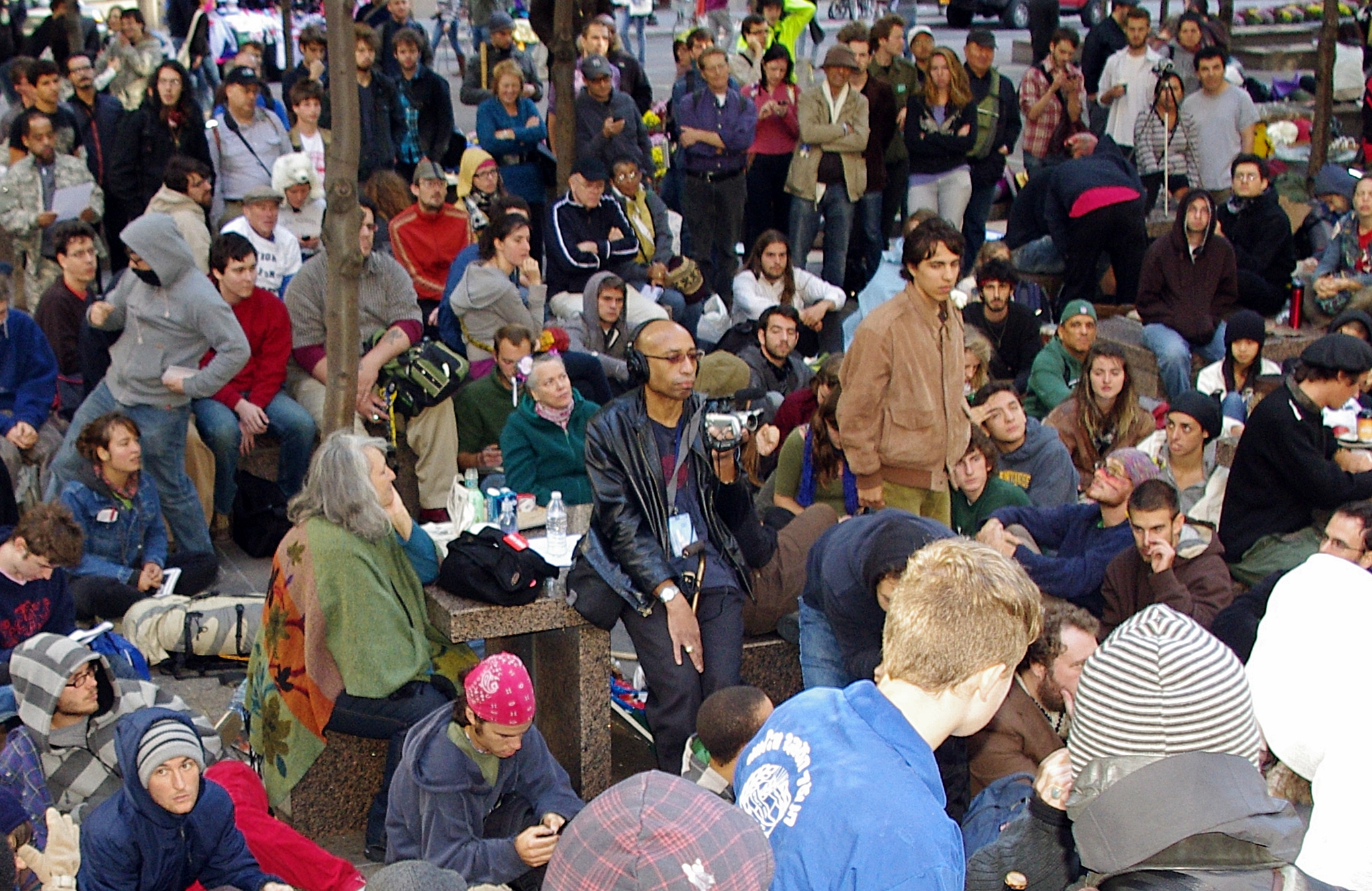
The crowd on September 18, 2011 (day 2).

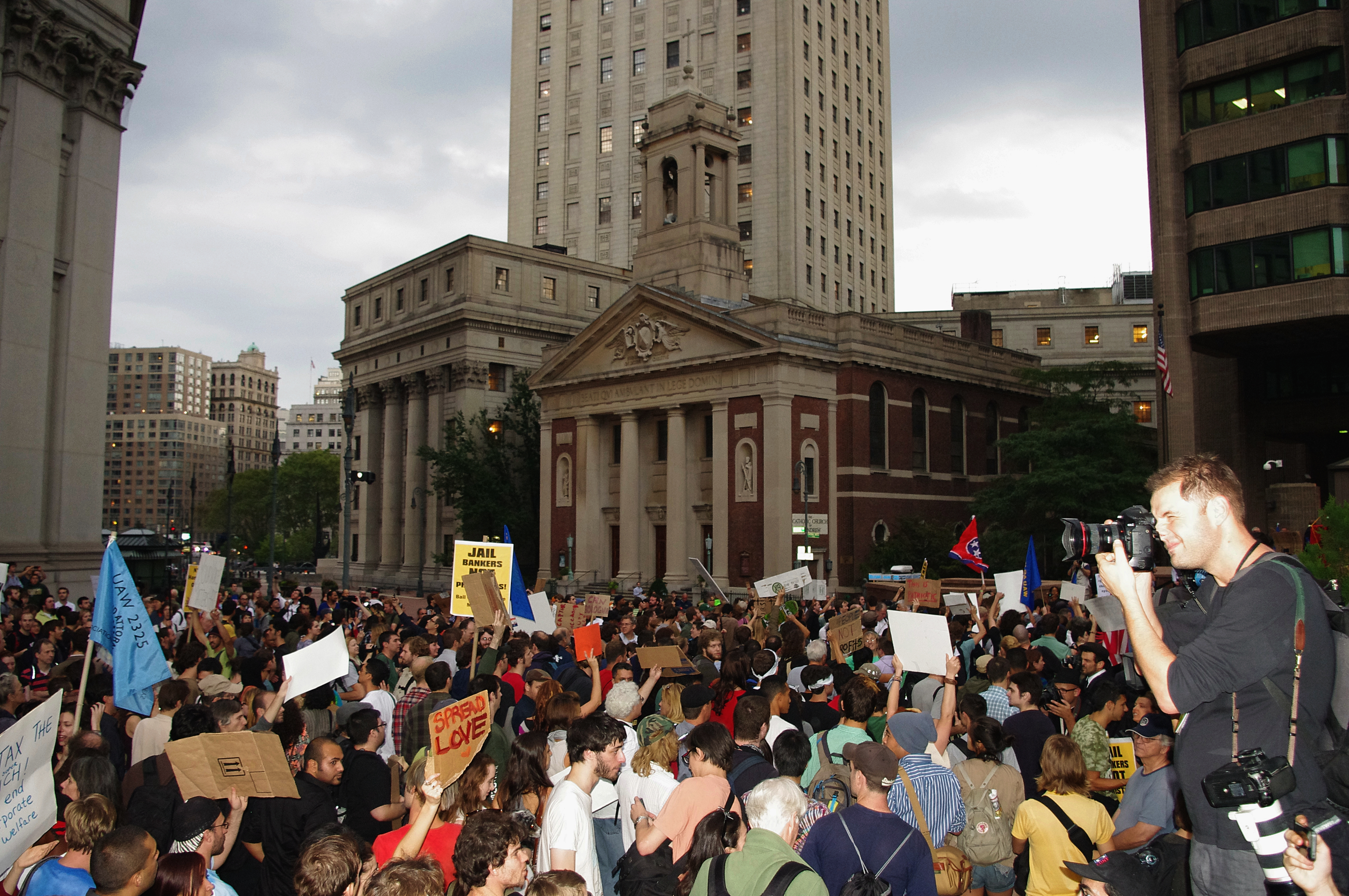
Protesters demonstrate outside NYPD headquarters on September 30, 2011 (day 14).

- September 17 – The first day of the OWS gathering. An estimated 1,000 people attend on the first day. The original location for the protest was One Chase Manhattan Plaza, with Bowling Green Park (the site of the "Charging Bull") and Zuccotti Park as alternate choices. Police discovered this before the protest began and fenced off two locations; but they left Zuccotti Park, the group's third choice, open. Since the park was private property, police could not legally force protesters to leave without being requested to do so by the property owner. In the beginning, officers of the New York City Police Department (NYPD) prohibited protesters from erecting tents, citing loitering rules.
- September 19 – Keith Olbermann, of Current TV, becomes the first major journalist to focus on the protests.
- September 20 – Police arrest mask-wearing protesters, using a law which bans masked gatherings unless part of "a masquerade party or like entertainment".
- September 21 – The Colbert Report satirizes the protests and major newspapers including The Guardian and The New York Times begin reporting on the protests.
- September 24 – At least 80 arrests are made by the NYPD after protesters begin marching uptown, forcing the closure of several streets.
- September 25 – YouTube discloses that the group Anonymous uploads a video around 4:30 pm on this day, threatening the NYPD: "If we hear of brutality in the next 36 hours then we will take you down from the internet as you have taken the protesters[sic] voices from the airwaves."
- September 26 – The name of the police officer who maced some young women on September 24 is revealed as Anthony Bologna by Anonymous. They also reveal the names of the officer's children and where they go to school, inviting retribution from the public. The official OWS website demands jail time for Bologna and the resignation of NYC Police Commissioner Raymond Kelly. As of April 2013, Bologna is facing a civil suit. Noam Chomsky spoke out in support of the OWS protests. That evening, filmmaker Michael Moore addressed the crowd at Zuccotti Park.
- September 27 – Over 700 Continental and United pilots, joined by additional pilots from other Air Line Pilots Association (ALPA) carriers, demonstrate in front of Wall Street
- September 27 – An OWS afternoon march merged with a rally by postal workers protesting against a five-day delivery week. NYC Councilman Charles Barron visited Zuccotti Park and announced his support for OWS. Later, Dr. Cornel West spoke at the park and opened the daily General Assembly.
- September 28 – The board of the local union of the Transport Workers Union of America (TWU Local-100) voted to support Occupy Wall Street. Police Commissioner Kelly publicly stated that the NYPD cannot bar protesters from Zuccotti Park since it is a privately owned public park and plaza that is required to stay open 24 hours a day.
- September 30 – More than 1,000 demonstrators, including representatives from various labor organizations, hold a peaceful march to the NYPD headquarters, a few blocks north of nearby New York City Hall, to protest what they said was a heavy-handed police response the previous week. No arrests are reported.

==== October 2011 ====
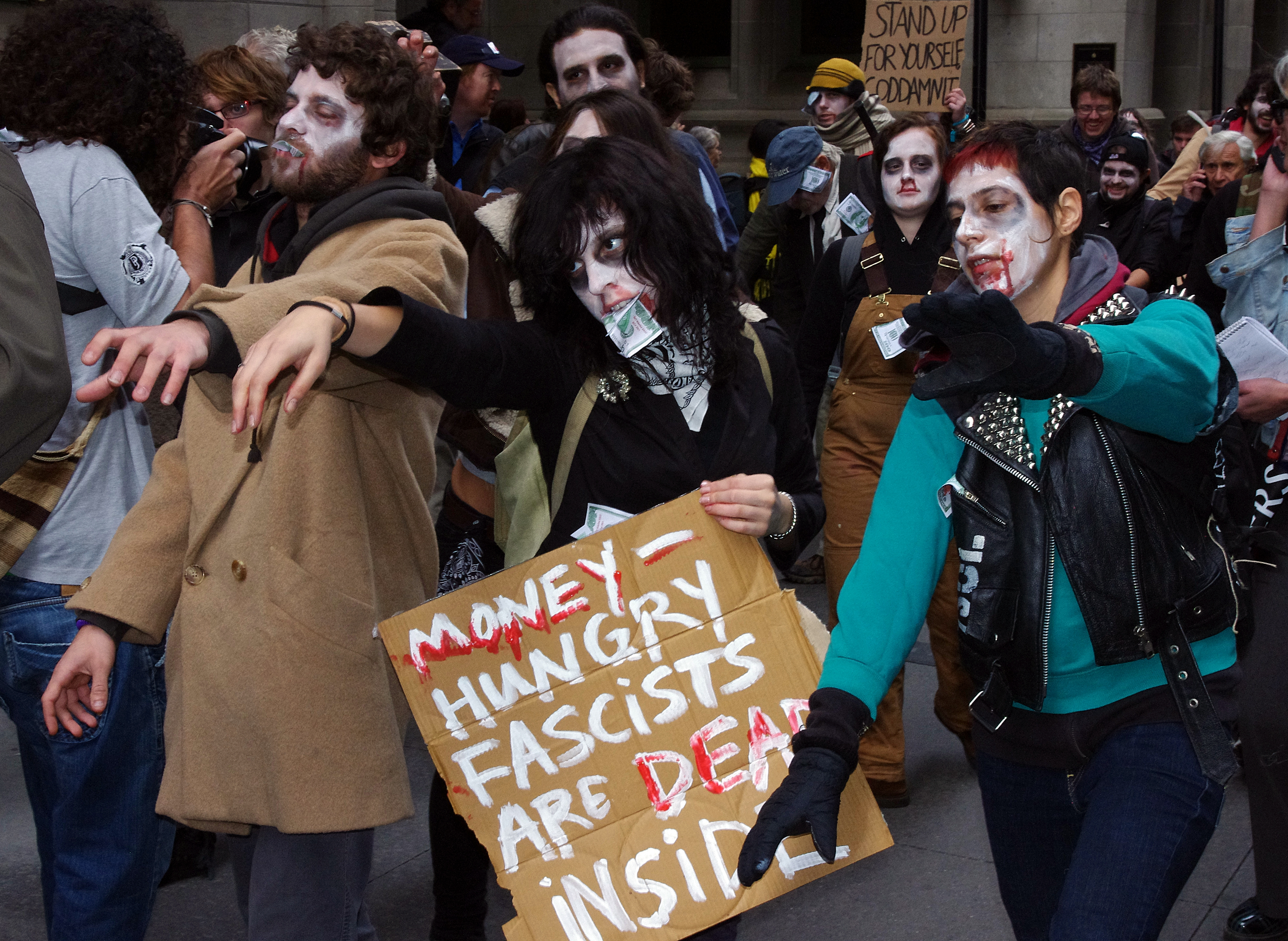
Protesters marching as corporate zombies on October 3

- October 1 – Protesters set out to march across the Brooklyn Bridge. The New York Times reported that more than 700 arrests were made. Some said the police had tricked protesters, allowing them onto the bridge, and even escorting them partway across. Jesse A. Myerson, a media coordinator for Occupy Wall Street said, "The cops watched and did nothing, indeed, seemed to guide us onto the roadway." However, some statements by protesters supported descriptions of the event given by police: for example, one protester Tweeted that "The police didn't lead us on to the bridge. They were backing the [expletive] up." A spokesman for the New York Police Department, Paul Browne, said that protesters were given multiple warnings to stay on the sidewalk and not block the street, and were arrested when they refused. By October 2, all but 20 of the arrestees had been released with citations for disorderly conduct and a New York City Criminal Court summons.
- October 5 – An estimated 5,000 to 15,000 demonstrators marching from lower Manhattan's Foley Square to Zuccotti Park. The march is mostly peaceful until after nightfall, when some demonstrators are arrested after 200 people storm barricades blocking them from Wall Street.

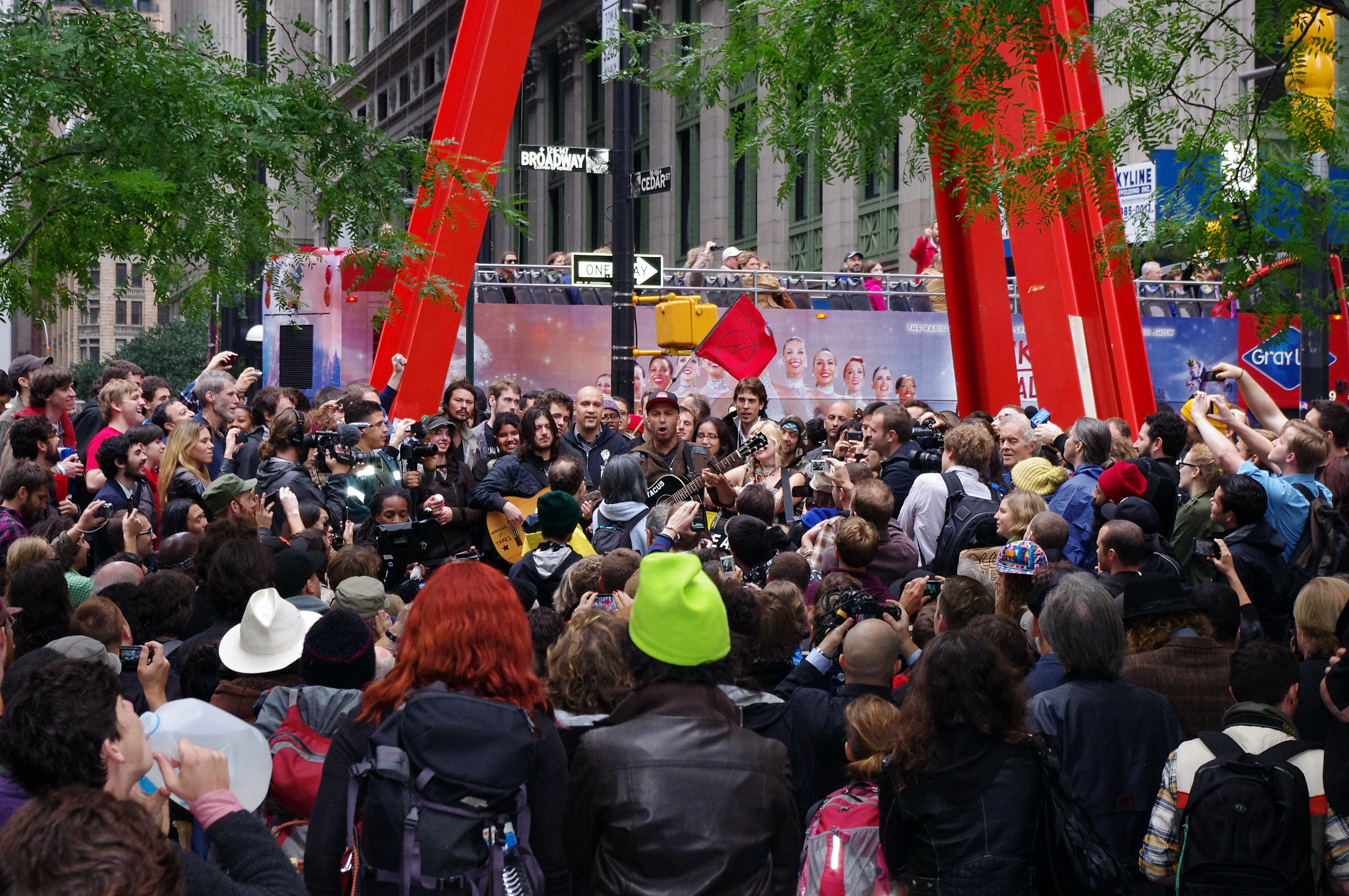
The crowd listening to Tom Morello of Rage Against the Machine on October 13, 2011

- October 10 – NYC Mayor Michael Bloomberg states that so long as protesters operate under the law, they will not be arrested. Protesters perceive this statement as a change in Bloomberg's stance, and the official @OccupyWallSt Twitter account declares, "Bloomberg said we can stay indefinitely! Big win!"
- October 13 – Mayor Bloomberg told demonstrators they would need to clear Zuccotti Park for it to be cleaned. The NYPD issued a statement saying that the protesters would no longer be allowed to keep sleeping equipment in the area.
- October 14 – Brookfield Office Properties postponed cleaning Zuccotti Park.
- October 15 – Thousands protested the Manhattan U.S. Armed Forces recruiting station.
- October 16 – President Obama extended support for the protesters. and the White House issued a statement saying Obama is working for the interests of the 99%.
- October 26 – Hundreds of OWS protesters marched near Union Square in support of Iraq War veteran and Occupy Oakland protester Scott Olsen who was in intensive care after being hit by a police-fired projectile.

==== November 2011 ====
- November 15 – At about 1am, NYPD began to clear Zuccotti Park. City Councilman Ydanis Rodriguez is reported to have been arrested when he and a group of other protesters tried to push their way through a line of police officers who were trying to prevent additional protesters from entering the park. The official statement released by Mayor Bloomberg's office explained the purpose of the late-night eviction:

This action was taken at this time of day to reduce the risk of confrontation in the park, and to minimize disruption to the surrounding neighborhood...[Mayor Bloomberg] [has] become increasingly concerned – as had the park's owner, Brookfield Properties – that the occupation was coming to pose a health and fire safety hazard to the protestors and to the surrounding community.

Journalists have been barred from entering immediate area of eviction since the raid began, and Mayor Bloomberg cited this as a way "to protect members of the press," and "to prevent a situation from getting worse". A CBS press helicopter was not allowed into the airspace above the park, which has been interpreted as an effort to limit media coverage of the event. A judge has issued a temporary restraining order in favor of the protestors, requiring Mayor Bloomberg to show cause for eviction. Mayor Bloomberg is scheduled to address the court order at 11:30am ET. Occupy Wall Street's statement released in response to the eviction cited exercising their right to assemble and the need to create a "civic space" as essential to changing public discourse. The Mayor's Office released statement addressing the complaints of protesters, including the following:

No right is absolute and with every right comes responsibilities. The First Amendment gives every New Yorker the right to speak out – but it does not give anyone the right to sleep in a park or otherwise take it over to the exclusion of others – nor does it permit anyone in our society to live outside the law. There is no ambiguity in the law here – the First Amendment protects speech – it does not protect the use of tents and sleeping bags to take over a public space (www.nyc.gov).

Some media outlets report that in the process of clearing out the park, 5,554 books at The People's Library are taken by police and stored at a sanitation facility to be picked up later by protesters.
Other media sources report that 2800 books were destroyed by the police and that OWS eventually settled a lawsuit with the city, collecting $232K.

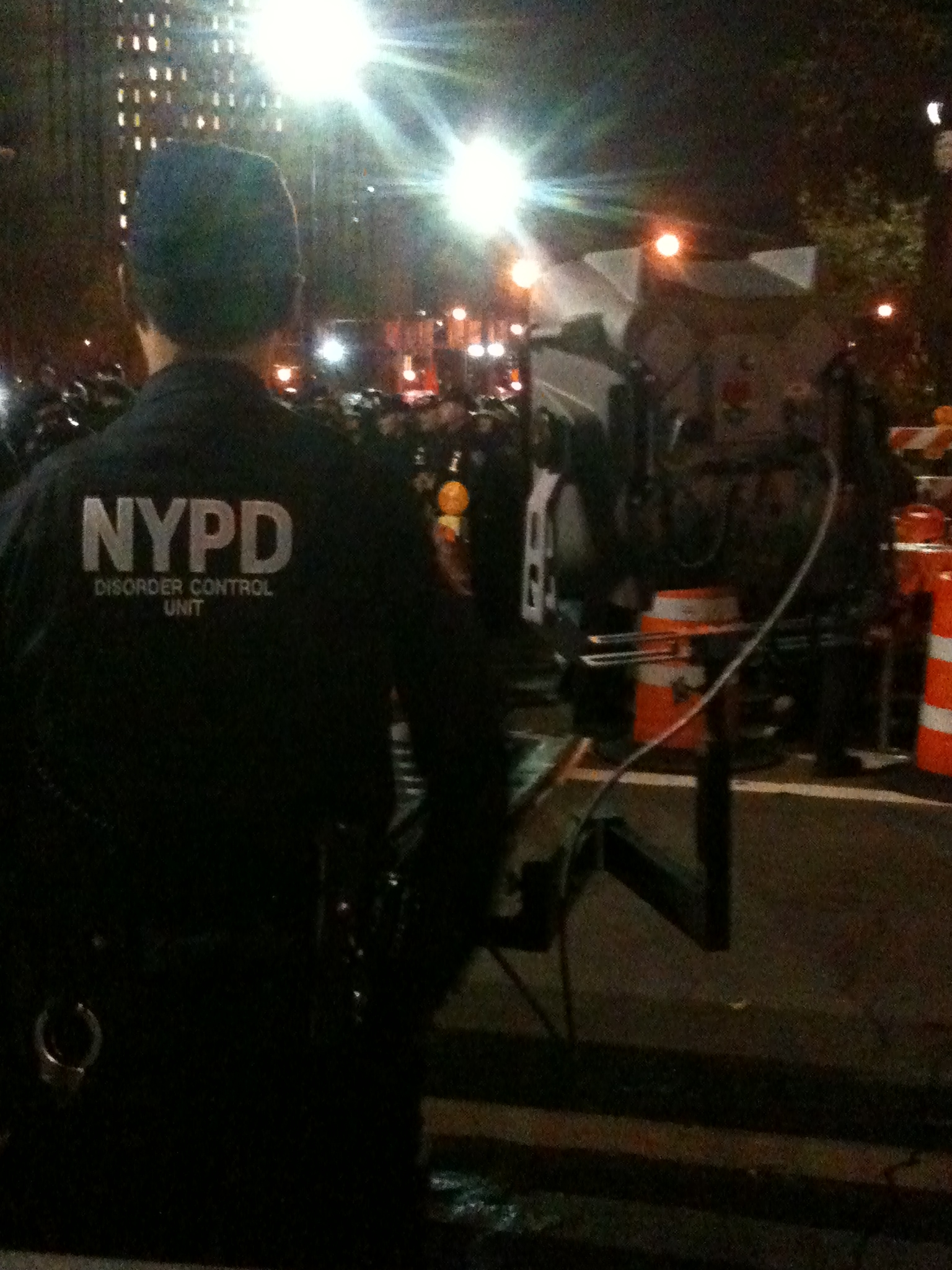
NYPD with an LRAD unit near the Brooklyn Bridge during the arrests on the evening of November 17

- November 17 – More than 30,000 demonstrated in and around Zuccotti Park, Union Square, Foley Square, the Brooklyn Bridge, and other locations through the city. A retired Philadelphia police captain, Ray Lewis, protested while wearing his uniform. He was arrested and charged with civil disobedience.
- November 18 - During a protest at University of California, Davis, university police pepper sprayed a group of demonstrators as they were seated on a paved path in the campus quad. The video of UC Davis police officer Lt. John Pike pepper-spraying demonstrators spread around the world as a viral video and the photograph became an internet meme. Officer Alex Lee also pepper-sprayed demonstrators at Pike's direction.

==== December 2011 ====
- December 17 – On the three-month anniversary of the protests, organizers of the protest called for a "reoccupation." The protestors surrounded LentSpace, a fenced-off park owned by Trinity Church, and began climbing over the fence. Two ladders were placed on either side of the gate, and the gate was also pulled up to allow hundreds of protestors to occupy the park for a few minutes before the police moved in. The protesters attempted to cut down multiple sections of the fence before the NYPD stopped them, arresting 58.
- December 12- A protest was held in coordination with Occupy Oakland's West Coast port blockade in Oakland, California. There were two protests: one at approximately 5:30 AM, and one at approximately 4pm (a rally was held before the 4pm event). Scott Owen known for his injuries with Occupy Oakland, was there at the time.
- December 20 – Anonymous exposes the personal information of police officers who have evicted OWS protesters; John Adler, president of the Federal Law Enforcement Officers Association, said that revealing such information might allow criminals to seek retribution against police.

=== 2012 ===
==== January 2012 ====
- January 1 – New York police arrested 68 Occupy Wall Street protesters after they moved back into Zuccotti Park where the movement began last year. Aside from one arrest on felony charges, the protesters were charged with "disorderly conduct, resisting arrest, and obstruction of government administration."
- January 3 – Approximately 200 Occupy protesters performed a flash mob at the main concourse of New York's Grand Central Terminal, in protest against President Obama's signing into law of a defense act that the protesters perceived as detrimental to civil liberties. Three people were arrested for disorderly conduct during the flash mob.
- January 8 – In a Financial Times series on 'rethinking capitalism' after the financial crisis, John Plender argues that popular acceptance of capitalism has waned for good reason: the widening of inequality. Former U.S. Treasury Secretary, Lawrence Summers considers that such a series in the Financial Times would have been unimaginable only five years ago. Since then the Tea Party and Occupy movement have altered the political landscape.
- January 10 – Hundreds of Occupy Wall Street protesters reentered Zuccotti Park after the barricades surrounding the park were removed. NYPD is enforcing new rules set by the owner that protesters are not allowed to lie down or sleep in the park.

==== March 2012 ====
- March 17 – Occupy Wall Street demonstrators attempted to reoccupy Zuccotti Park to mark the movement's six month anniversary. Just before midnight on March 17 they are soon cleared away by police, who made over 100 arrests.
- March 20 – Protestors marched to the NYPD headquarters to demand the Police Commissioner's resignation.
- March 24 – During a last-minute anti-police brutality march, 10 protestors were arrested. Later in the day, during a planned civil disobedience, "mock corporate polluters" set up shop in front of United Nations headquarters to promote their false solutions to the climate crisis; dressed as corporate executives they "occupied the planet". 5 people were arrested.

==== September 2012 ====
- September 17 – Occupy Wall Street held protests during its one year anniversary, thousands demonstrated throughout the financial district, resulting in 185 arrests.

=== 2013 ===
- April 9 - NYC signs documents today agreeing to settle some OWS lawsuits, the city agreeing to pay protesters for destroying the protesters' library and property.
- June 1 - Re-Occupy Wall Street had over 5,000 Turkish Occupiers and about 500 OWS Occupiers that showed up in Zuccotti Park throughout the day to show Solidary between Occupy Gezy and Occupy Wall Street. It was planned that the protests would span from that day onward to October.
- September 17 - At least 100 members of Occupy Wall Street return to Zuccotti Park to mark the second anniversary of their beginnings. Later in the day, there is a march to Washington Square Park and a general assembly is held at Zuccotti as "a nod to the massive general assembly meetings that were held on a daily basis in the park at the height of the movement."

=== 2014 ===
- September 17 - to mark the 3rd anniversary of the beginning of the OWS movement, former participants gathered in Zuccotti Park for lectures and speeches. But mainstream media outlets report that crowds did not exceed 50 people. To observe the 3rd anniversary, another OWS offshoot campaign called Strike Debt announced it had wiped out almost $4 million in student loans, amounting to the indebtedness of 2,761 students.

=== 2015 ===
- September 17 - A small group of housing activists gather in Zuccotti Park on the fourth anniversary of Occupy Wall Street. The group, called 'Homes for Every New Yorker,' march to New York City Hall demanding more affordable housing options for the homeless and where "they planned to set up tents and camp out for the night and "occupy de Blasio's City Hall," a reference to NYC Mayor Bill de Blasio.

Also, an article published today in the International Business Times reported that:

In New York, the 2,644 Occupy-related arrests in 2011 resulted in 409 guilty pleas or convictions [...]. The city has paid out $1.5 million to settle 80 lawsuits, with dozens more still pending. That cost doesn't include legal fees and overtime for officers who were required to patrol streets around Zuccotti Park during the two months that it was occupied.

== See also ==
Occupy articles

- List of Occupy movement topics
- List of global Occupy protest locations
- Occupy movement
- We are the 99%
- Occupy Our Homes
- Reactions to Occupy Wall Street
- Occupy Rose Parade

International protests

- 2011 Spanish protests
- Occupy Canada
- Occupy Toronto

Related articles

- Arab Spring
- Bank Transfer Day
- The Corporation (documentary film)
- Corporatocracy
- Corruption Perceptions Index
- Economic inequality
- Grassroots movement
- Income inequality in the United States
- Meritocracy
- Plutocracy
- The Shock Doctrine (book)
- Wealth inequality in the United States
