= Occupy Rose Parade =

Occupy Movement demonstration and protest

Occupy The Rose Parade (OTRP) was a four phase Occupy demonstration and protest by approximately 10,000 Occupy Movement activists that was held on January 1 and January 2, 2012 as part of the Occupy movement at the Tournament of Roses Parade in Pasadena, California held on January 2, 2012. The main organizer of the 2012 OTRP, Pete Thottam, is a Los Angeles based Occupy volunteer, attorney and longtime antiwar activist. Phase 1 of the demonstration was on Sunday, January 1. It was organized by a separate group from the Occupy Pasadena group protesting locally, with no affiliation or endorsement between the two although a number of members of Occupy Pasadena actively participated in and helped organize the Occupy The Rose Parade demonstration. Rose Parade and Pasadena officials authorized the Occupy the Rose Parade movement to march at the end of the parade, after all the floats have passed and the phalanx of police cars moves through, but while the crowd is still in place.

The protest's central human float action was a peaceful and nonviolent protest with no arrests. Organizers worked with the City of Pasadena, Official Tournament of Roses Parade organizers and the Pasadena Police.

The Rose Parade, in person, has an annual audience of a million people, and a worldwide television audience on multiple networks. On the day of the event, the worldwide television broadcast cut to the announcers in the booth, eliminating any coverage of the protestors. Live streaming presented the event over the internet.

== Speakers ==
Among the speakers at the January 1 and January 2 protest and demonstrations included Reverend Bacon (All Saints Pasadena Church), Martin Sheen, Ed Asner, Carlos Marroquin (U.S. Foreclosure Activist), Ellen Brown (Web of Debt & Public Banking advocate), John Goodman (California Clean Money Campaign), Peter Thottam, Daniel Wayne Lee (Move To Amend Co-Chair), Marcy Winograd, Cindy Sheehan, Michelle Shocked, singer Laura Love and singer Jackson Browne, and other nationally recognized Occupy activists and their supporters from around the country. The speakers and protest action sought primarily to emphasize "Corporate Money out of Politics," "Stopping Foreclosures," and "Ending Corporate Personhood" messages of Occupy Wall Street and, more broadly, to put spotlight on what activists state is a dysfunctional U.S. system with growing economic and social justice concerns that have reached crisis proportions in the U.S.

== Announcements ==
On November 11, 2011, on their website the organizers stated "...we will in no way obstruct the path of the Rose Parade. This will be a peaceful and non-violent but spectacular protest of Occupiers everywhere calling for campaign finance reform and broader systemic reforms."

That same day, conservative website Breitbart.tv reported that Occupy Rose Parade intended to disrupt the Rose Parade.
