= Occupy Faith =

Occupy Faith is an ally of the Occupy movement that supports the movement due to its members' religious and spiritual values. Groups are established by activists and religious leaders.

In the United States, in 2011, a national gathering was held in New York City at the Judson Memorial Church. Representatives attended from a diverse set of spiritual and religious communities. A result of the gathering was a statement about the way members of Occupy Faith would be involved in Occupy Wall Street, specifically about having an open democracy, affordable housing, quality education, and other values. Groups from cities, like Occupy Faith DC, have joined in Occupy movement events. Their viewpoints are based upon their values, like non-violence and realigning the political power of the top 1% of the country. Occupy Faith UK (of the United Kingdom) was also formed based upon values that would improve the lives of many of its country's residents.
