= Occupy San Francisco =

Protest group against economic inequality

- Part of the Occupy movement
- Date: September 17, 2011 – December 11, 2011 (85 days)
- Location: San Francisco, California
- Caused by: Economic inequality; Corporate influence over government
- Methods: Non violent protest; Civil disobedience; Occupation; Picketing; Demonstrations

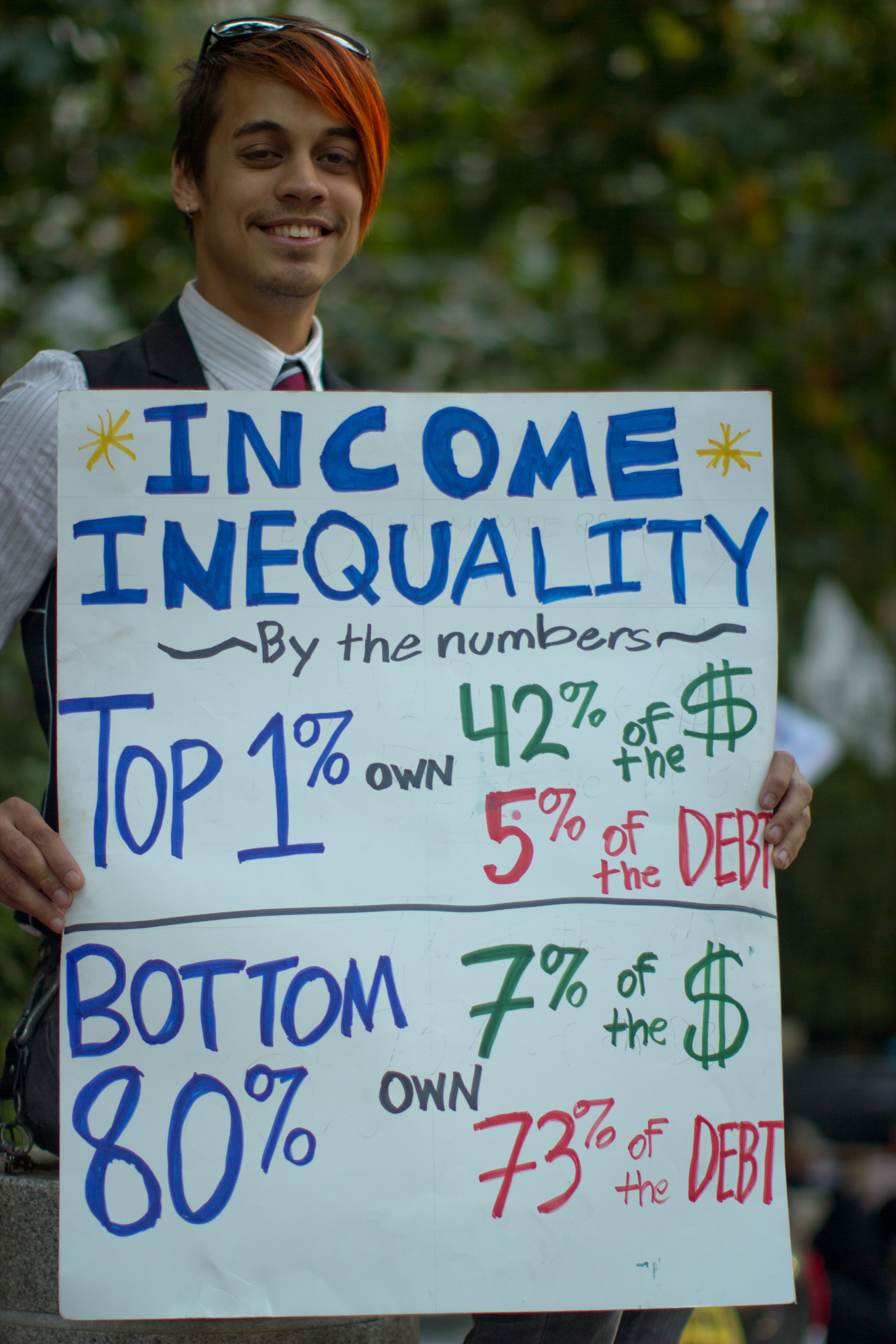
A Protester with a sign at Occupy San Francisco

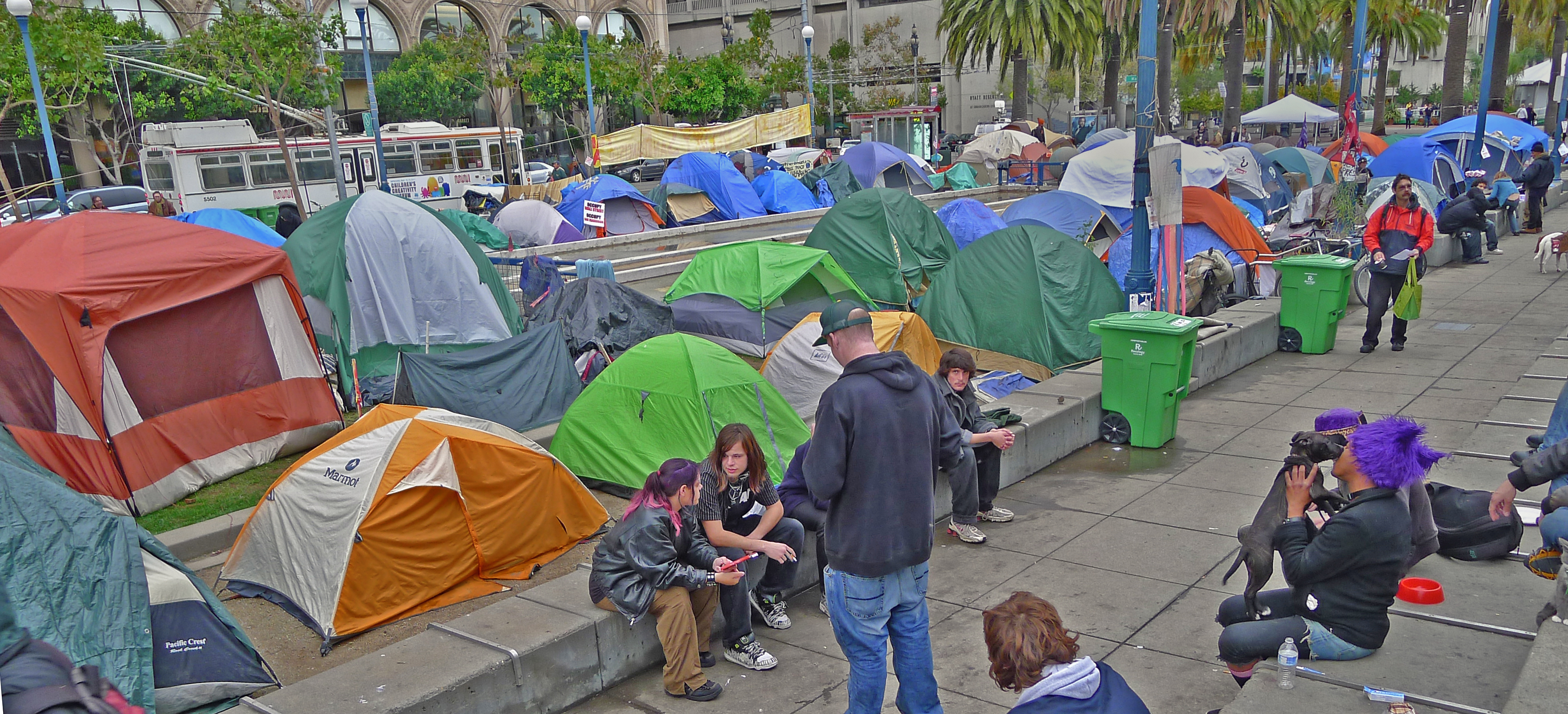
Tent City camp in Occupy San Francisco

Occupy San Francisco was a collaboration that began with a demonstration event located at Justin Herman Plaza in the Embarcadero and in front of the Federal Reserve building on Market Street in the Financial District in San Francisco, California. It is based on the Occupy Wall Street movement that began in New York City on September 17, 2011 and is one of several "Occupy" protest sites in the San Francisco Bay Area; other sites include Occupy Oakland and Occupy San Jose.

As of June 2012, Occupy San Francisco had continued to engage in organized meetings, events and actions.

== Chronology ==
On September 17, 2011, a small group of about 10 protesters set up camp in front of a Bank of America building in the Financial District. The protesters moved to Union Square for one day then relocated to the entrance to the Federal Reserve Building on September 29, 2011 where they set up tents, sleeping bags, and tarps. On October 7, 2011, the encampment consisting of tents, cooking gear, and other belongings was dismantled and taken away by the San Francisco police and city workers because it posed a public safety risk. One protester was arrested. The protestors, however, remained at the Federal Reserve site.

An additional protest site was set up at Justin Herman Plaza on the evening of October 15, 2011. The San Francisco police and city workers dismantled the camp the next evening because it was in violation of city codes. Five protesters were arrested. The camp was rebuilt the next day, on October 17, 2011. Protesters attended the San Francisco Police Commission meeting on October 19, 2011, to protest their treatment on October 15. An initially contentious meeting ended when Police Chief Greg Suhr told the protesters that he is working with Mayor Ed Lee to provide port-a-potties and hand washing stations at Justin Herman Plaza.

Police raided a section of the Occupy San Francisco camp in the early hours of November 16, dismantling 15 tents which formed an overspill from the main encampment in Justin Herman Plaza and arresting seven people.

On November 16, hundreds of demonstrators, many of whom were California college students, marched through downtown San Francisco to protest the continuing tuition and fee hikes proposed and approved by the University of California Regents. Along the way, about 200 demonstrators staged a sit-in at a Bank of America branch. The bank was chosen because UC Regent Monica Lozano is on the bank's board of directors. Some demonstrators jumped on desks and wrote on the wall in chalk. One man was seen urinating in the corner. Roughly 100 demonstrators remained in the branch, set up a tent, sat down, and linked arms. 95 demonstrators were arrested for trespassing.

The main encampment at Justin Herman Plaza was dismantled following a raid at approximately 1:00am on December 7. Seventy protesters were arrested on suspicion of illegal lodging in a public park. The site retained a police presence for several days, with signs posted stating the park was closed for renovation. Crowds swelled at the original protest site, outside the Federal Reserve building, and on December 8 it had developed into an encampment. The site continued to grow until Sunday, December 11, when police dismantled the encampment and arrested 55 protesters in the process.

In January 2012, a few members of Occupy San Francisco stated they will be submitting an application with the California Department of Financial Institutions to charter a credit union. The credit union, to be named People's Reserve Credit Union, will follow the pattern of the Grameen Bank in Bangladesh with low interest rate loans being granted to those people who generally do not qualify for credit.

== Responses and reception ==
San Francisco Board of Supervisors member and mayoral candidate John Avalos has visited the Federal Reserve site and said of the October 7, 2011 camp dismantling: "With our unemployment rate nearing 10 percent, we have a responsibility to be a sanctuary for the 99 percent. Instead, last night we witnessed that 99 percent being detained, arrested and intimidated with force."

On October 27, 2011 the police massed at the Potrero Hill substation and planned a raid, under orders from the Mayor to clean up perceived health issues. Some members of the San Francisco Board of Supervisors (the city council of San Francisco) stood in solidarity with the Occupy San Francisco movement, and the police canceled their raid.

On February 28, 2012, the protest site at 101 Market began to be Occupied 24 hours once again. There is also a De-Colonize Yoga event every Friday above the 16th and Mission Bart Station (10 weeks continuous). A free store in Daly City is currently open on Saturdays between 10am and 5pm. General Assemblies still occur on Tuesdays and Thursdays at 6pm. There are attempts to continue a Saturday General Assembly that is not currently weekly.

Occupy Education's "99-mile March for Education" to Sacramento was supported by Occupy San Francisco members and was covered by Occupy San Francisco Media members on March 1, 2012 through March 5, 2012.

== Marches ==
The first march took place on September 29, 2011.

On Wednesday, October 5, 2011, hundreds of people participated in a mid-day march from the Federal Reserve protest site to Civic Center Plaza.

On October 15, 2011, thousands participated in a march from Justin Herman Plaza to the San Francisco City Hall. Dubbed the "Global Day of Action," #15october, "Occupy Earth," and now known as the 15 October 2011 global protests, it was a broad coordination of people-to-people diplomacy between online activists around the world, including many from Occupy San Francisco.

== Gallery ==
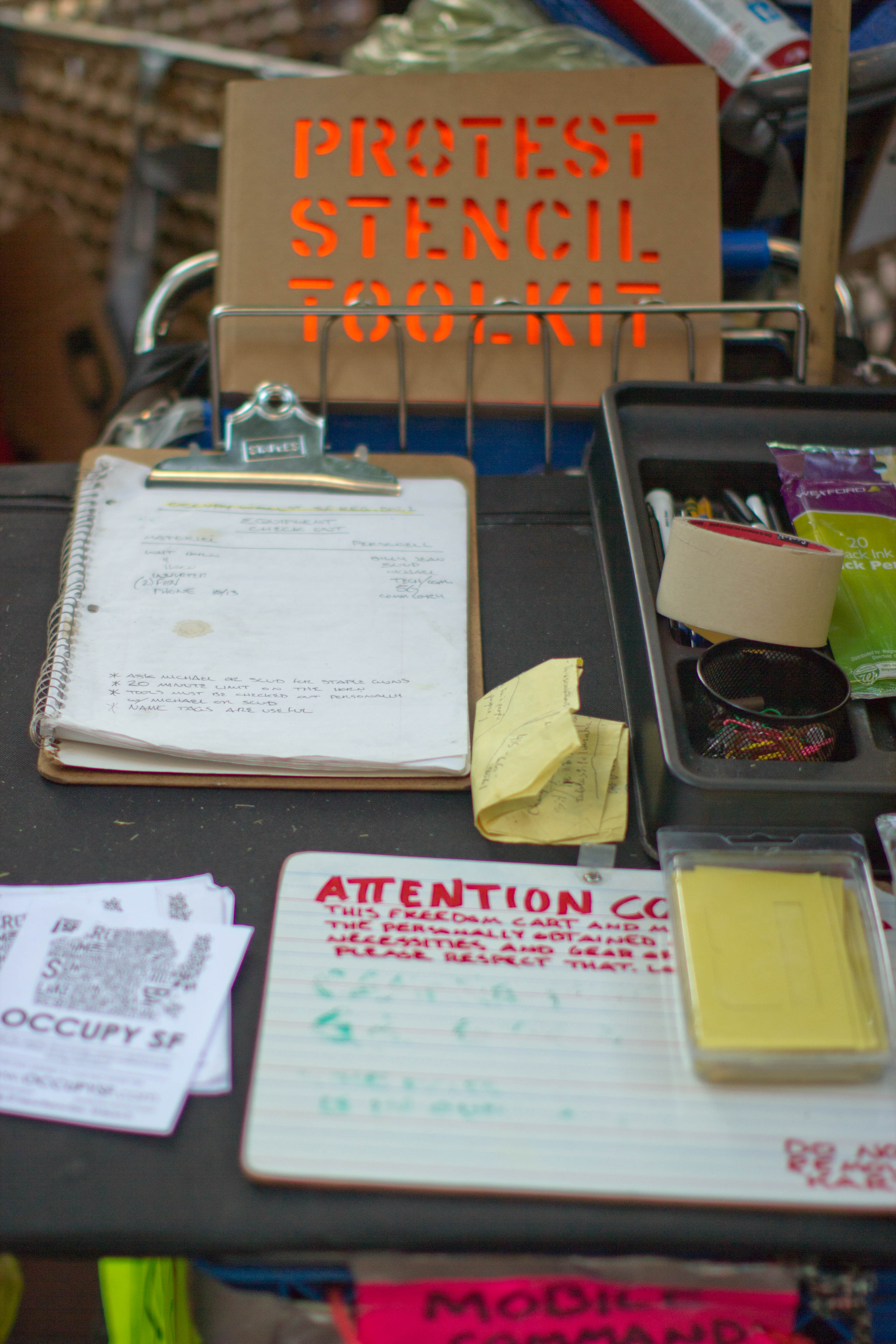

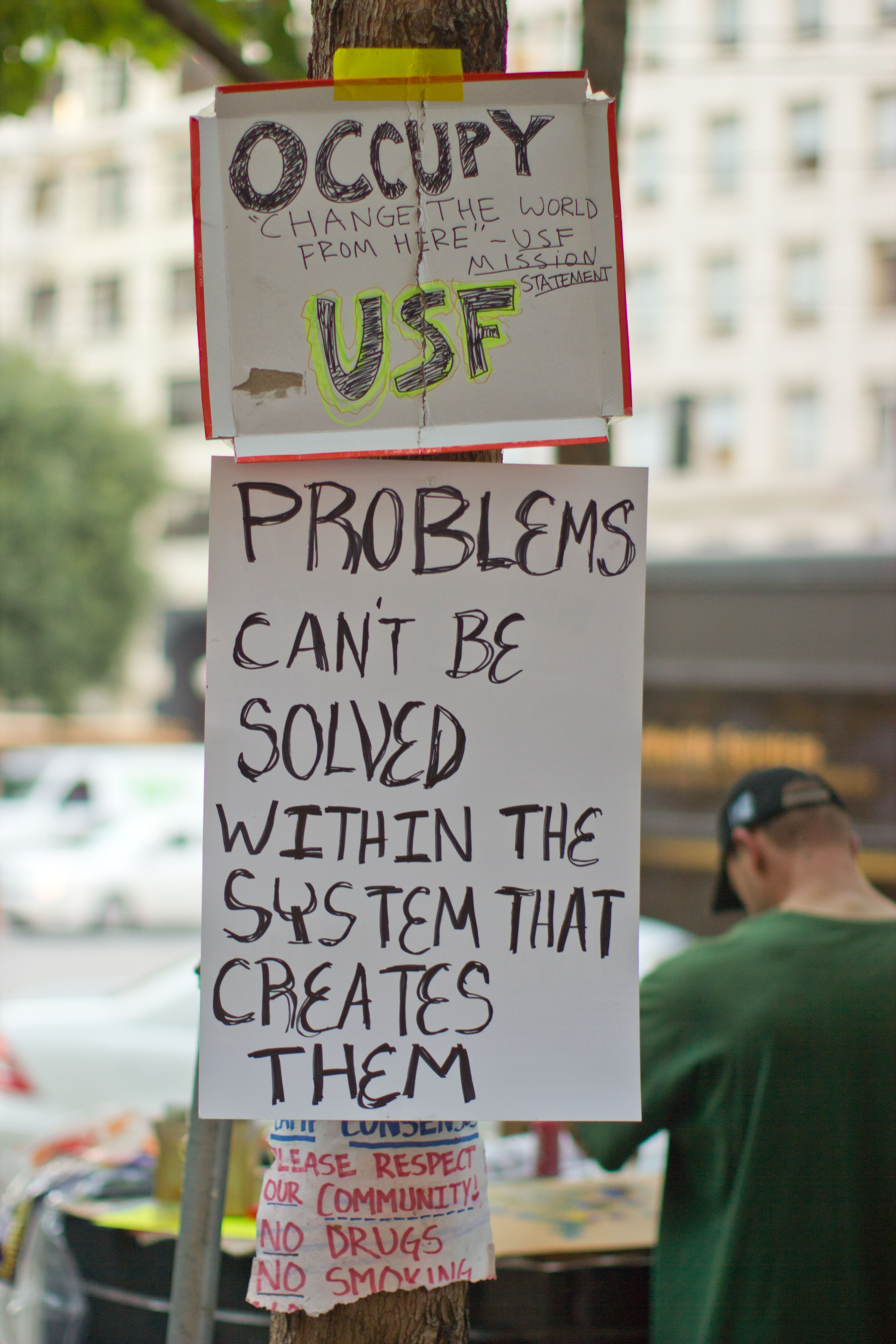

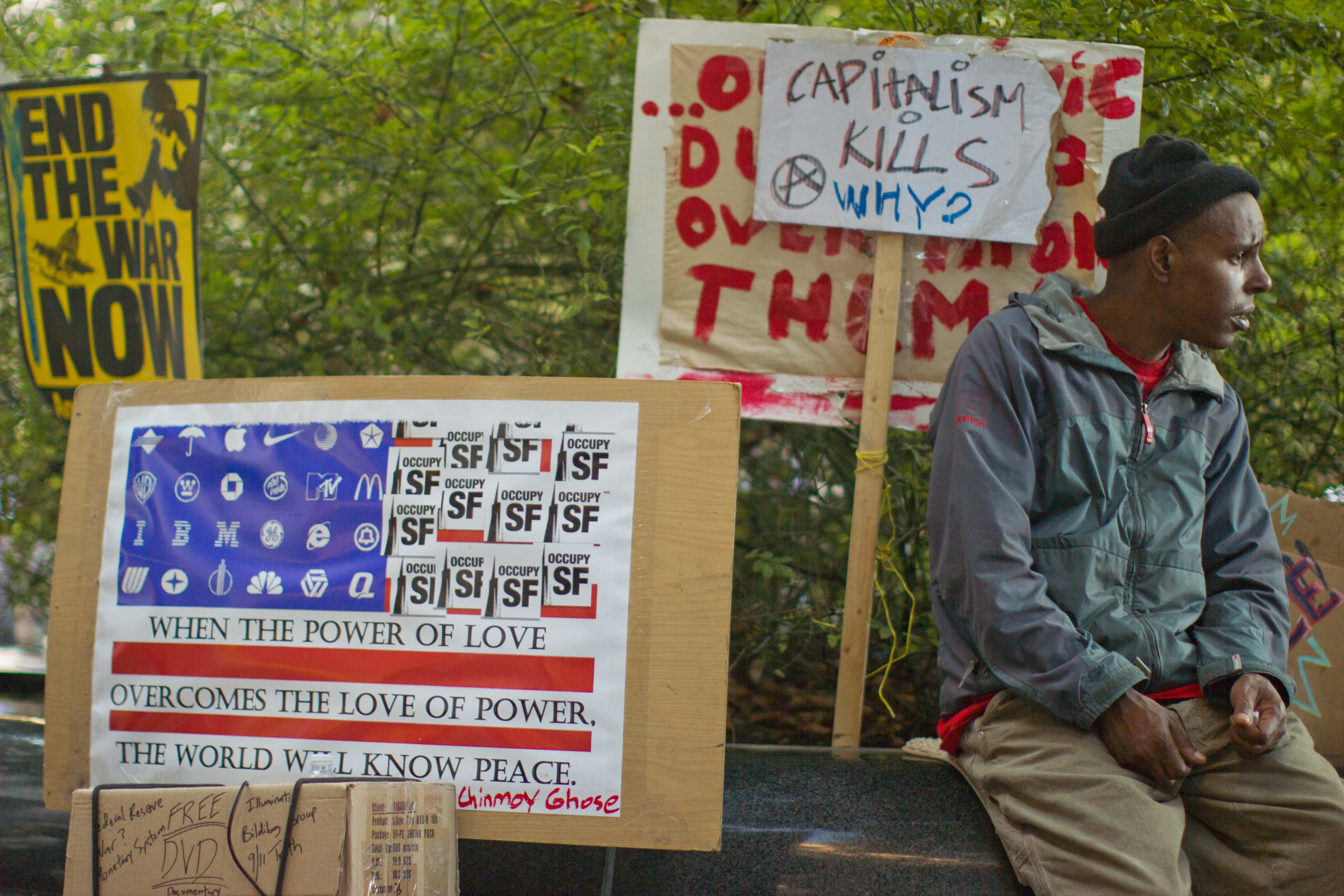

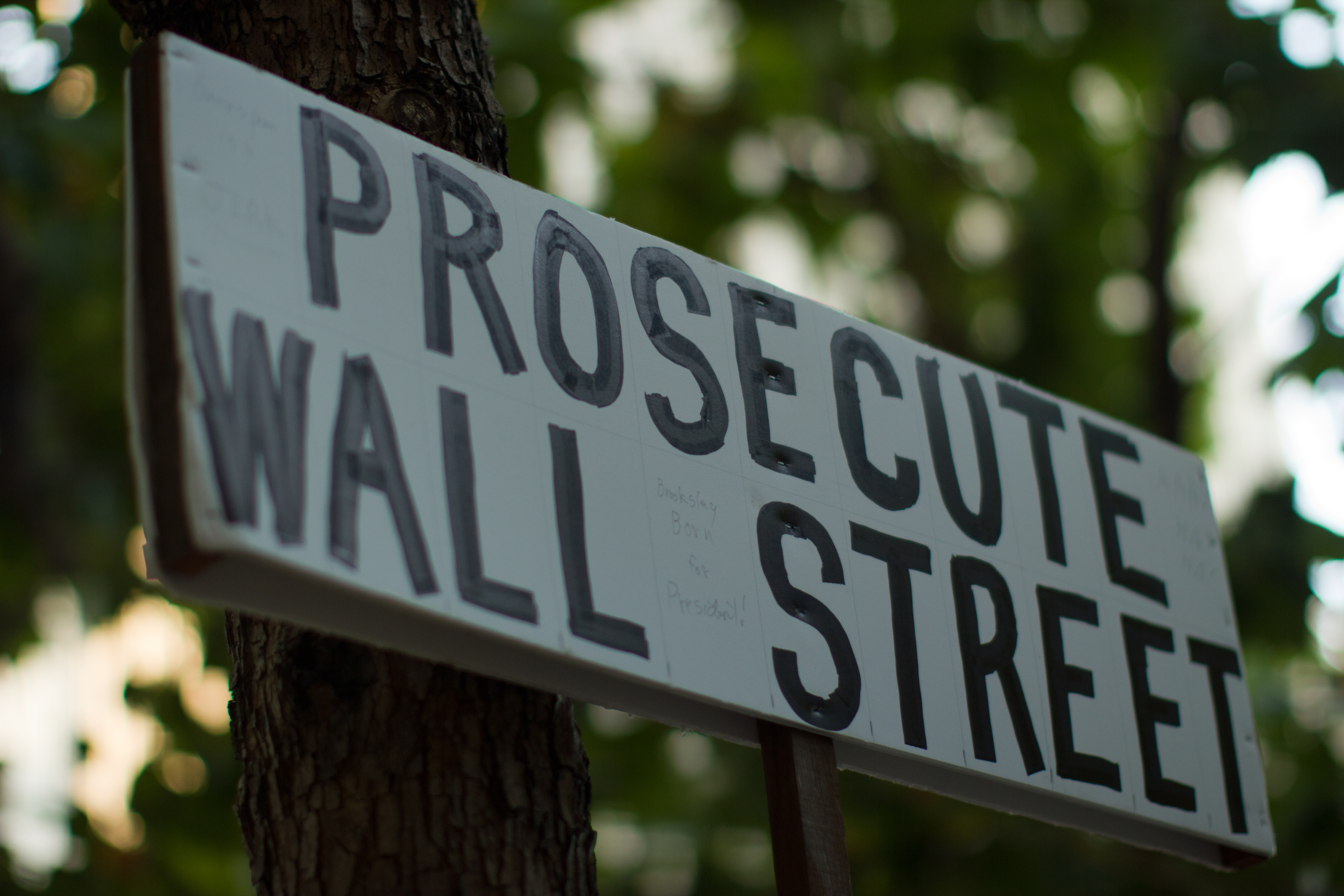

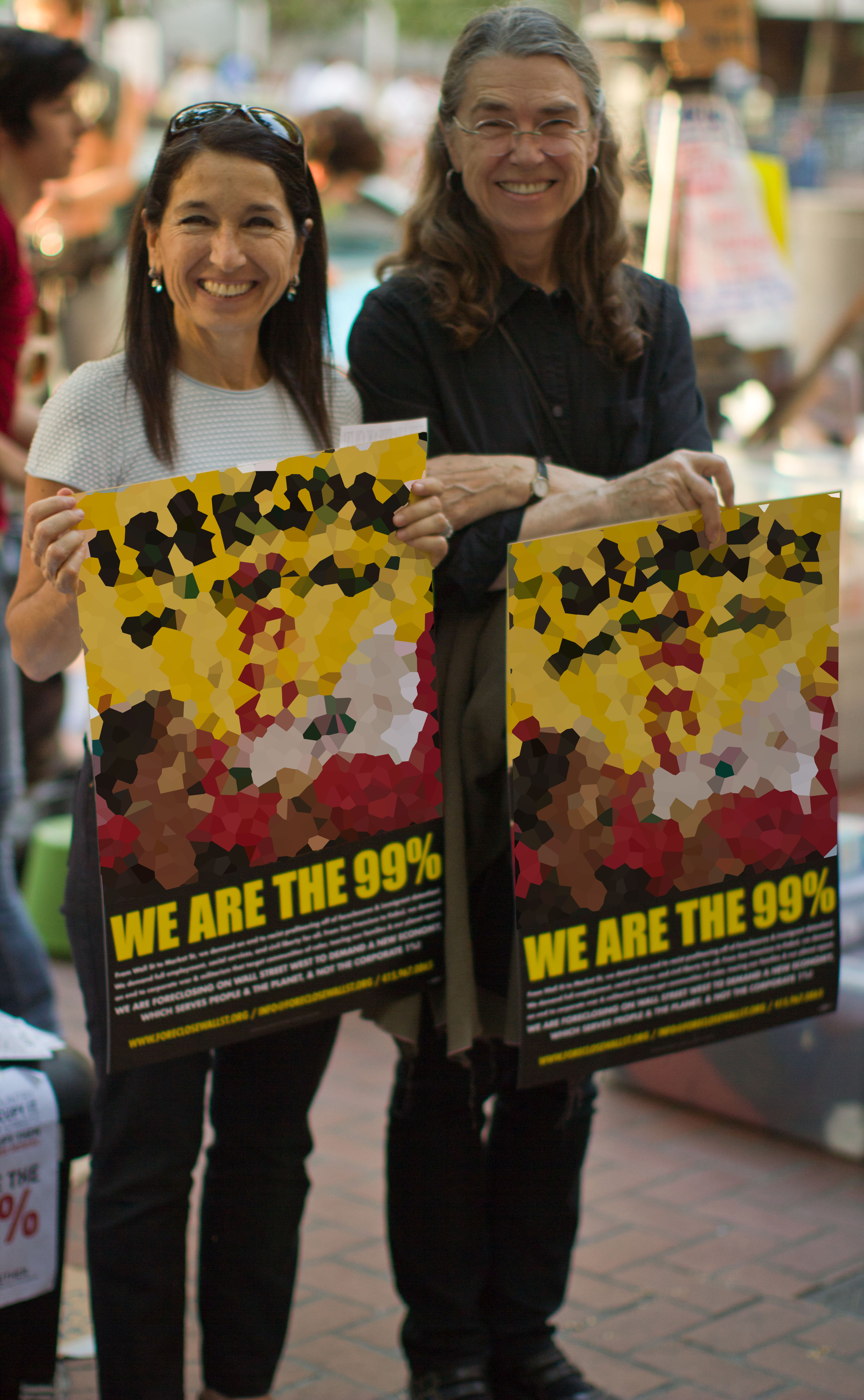

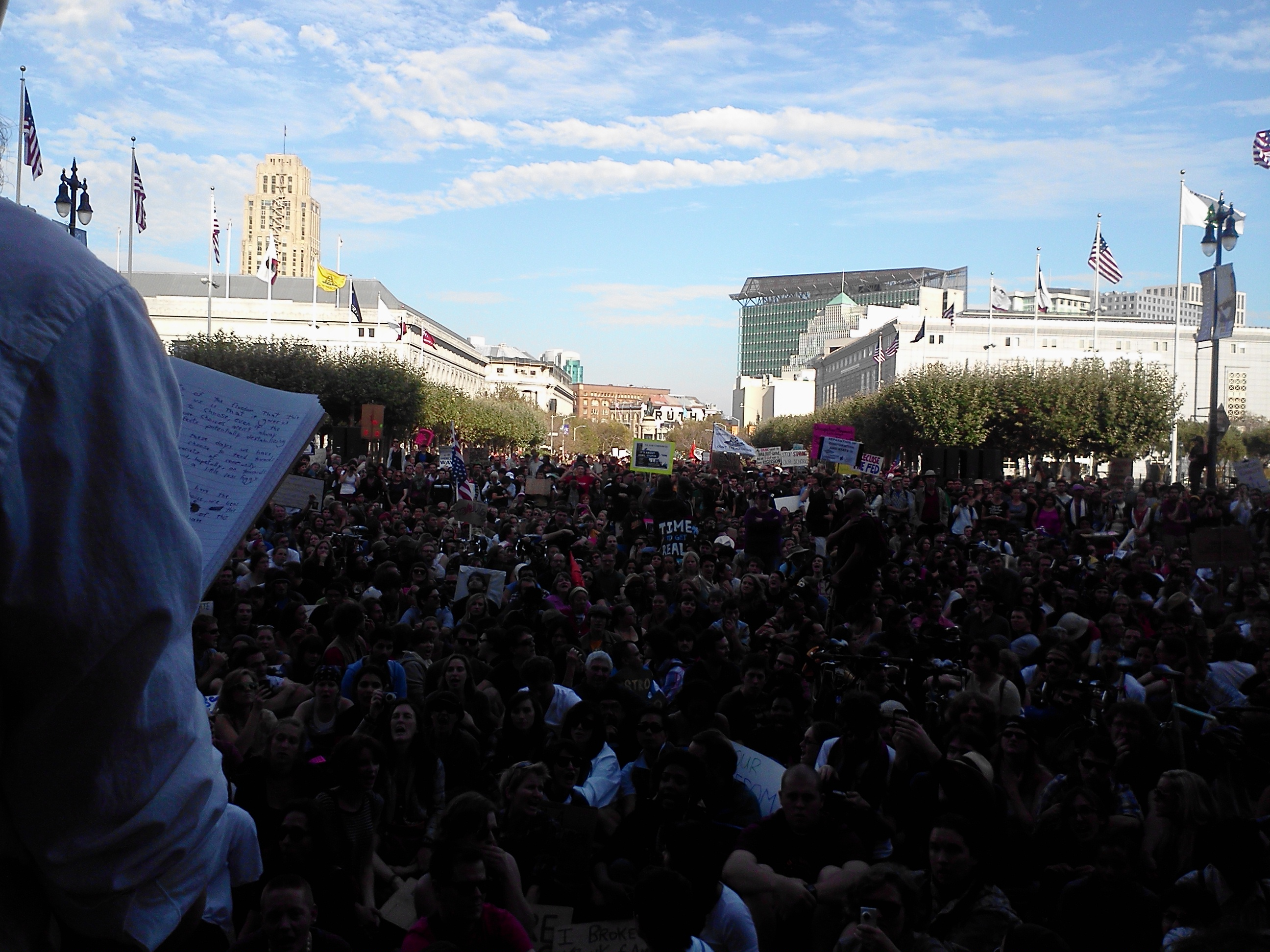

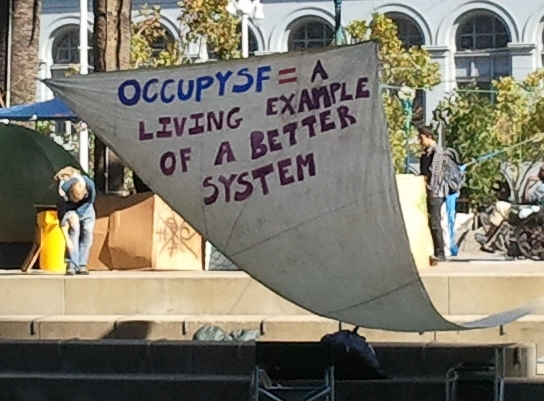

== See also ==
Occupy articles

- List of global Occupy protest locations
- Occupy movement
- Timeline of Occupy Wall Street
- We are the 99%

Other U.S. protests

- 2011 United States public employee protests
- 2011 Wisconsin protests

Related articles

- Economic inequality
- Grassroots movement
- Income inequality in the United States
- Lobbying
- Plutocracy
- Protest
- Tea Party protests
- Timeline of Occupy Wall Street
- Wealth inequality in the United States

Related portals:
