= List of Occupy movement protest locations in the United States =

The Occupy movement began in the United States initially with the Occupy Wall Street protests in New York City but spread to many other cities, both in the United States and worldwide. There have been hundreds of Occupy movement protests worldwide over time. This is a list of some of their locations in the United States. The state with the most protests is California, which has over fifty protest locations (see List of Occupy movement protest locations in California).

== List ==
State	City	Date (start)	Crowd (upper estimate)	References	Notes
Alabama	Auburn	October 15, 2011	25		
Alabama	Birmingham	October 15, 2011	300		
Alabama	Huntsville	October 29, 2011	150		
Alabama	Mobile	October 8, 2011	50		
Alabama	Montgomery	October 22, 2011			
Alabama	Tuscaloosa	October 8, 2011	40		
Alaska	Anchorage	October 4, 2011	60		
Alaska	Bethel	October 15, 2011	1		
Alaska	Fairbanks	October 15, 2011	100+		By February 1, protesters consisted of "a core group of about 15 people with a larger group of supporters"
Alaska	Homer	October 15, 2011	60		
Alaska	Juneau	October 15, 2011			
Alaska	Kenai	October 29, 2011			
Alaska	Unalaska	October 16, 2011	10		
Arizona	Flagstaff	October 15, 2011			
Arizona	Phoenix	October 14, 2011	4,000		
Arizona	Prescott	October 6, 2011	25+		
Arizona	Tempe	October 15, 2011			
Arizona	Tucson	October 1, 2011			
Arizona	Yuma	November 19, 2011			
Arkansas	Conway	October 26, 2011			
Arkansas	Fayetteville	October 11, 2011			
Arkansas	Jonesboro	October 15, 2011			
Arkansas	Little Rock	October 15, 2011	400		
California	See List of Occupy movement protest locations in California				
Colorado	Aspen				
Colorado	Boulder	October 15, 2011			By December, a tent encampment was set up at the pedestrian Pearl Street Mall downtown in the park in front of the City Courthouse. Another was then set up in Sister City's Plaza in front of the Municipal Building.
Colorado	Colorado Springs				
Colorado	Denver				This Occupy faced quite a lot of police violence long after the encampment was brutally evicted twice. Cost to city: $365,000
Colorado	Fort Collins				
Colorado	Grand Junction				
Colorado	Longmont	October 10, 2011	12		
Colorado	Pueblo				
Connecticut	Branford	October 6, 2011			
Connecticut	Bridgeport	October 11, 2011	30		
Connecticut	Hartford	October 7, 2011			
Connecticut	New Haven	October 8, 2011			As of March 5, 2012, Occupy New Haven on the New Haven green is the last occupying group in New England.
Connecticut	New London				
Delaware	Wilmington	October 15, 2011	150		
District of Columbia	Washington	October 1, 2011	3,000		Occupy D.C., sometimes also went by "Occupy K Street"
Florida	Daytona Beach				
Florida	Ft. Myers				
Florida	Gainesville				
Florida	Jacksonville				
Florida	Lakeland				
Florida	Melbourne				
Florida	Miami				
Florida	Orlando				
Florida	Pensacola				
Florida	Sarasota				
Florida	St. Augustine				
Florida	St. Petersburg				
Florida	Tallahassee	October 6, 2011	150		One of few remaining "full time" occupation sites. Located at the corner of Gaines St. and Duval in Tallahassee. www.occupytally.org
Florida	Tampa	September 24, 2011	2,000+		
Florida	Vero Beach				
Florida	West Palm Beach				
Georgia	Athens				
Georgia	Atlanta				Occupy Atlanta;
Georgia	Augusta				
Georgia	Dalton				
Georgia	Fort Benning				
Georgia	Macon				
Georgia	Savannah				
Georgia	Valdosta				
Hawaii	Hilo				
Hawaii	Honolulu				Group's name is (De)Occupy Honolulu, in solidarity with occupied peoples worldwide.
Hawaii	Kauaʻi				
Hawaii	Kona				
Hawaii	Maui				Small band of occupiers camped on the outskirts of the State Building in Wailuku for a weekend in October before being evicted from the site by Maui Police under threat of charges of criminal trespass. Movement (dubbed "Occupy Wall Street Maui") holds weekly meetings at a local college.
Idaho	Boise				Deemed the most efficiently organized occupation of two dozen visited. Now maintains a symbolic, highly-portable presence after a landscaping hiatus.
Idaho	Idaho Falls				
Idaho	Moscow				
Idaho	Pocatello				
Illinois	Bloomington –Normal	October 5, 2011			Including tent city at Illinois State University. 2nd longest continuous student occupation.
Illinois	Carbondale				
Illinois	Champaign –Urbana				
Illinois	Chicago		8,000		Occupy Chicago
Illinois	DeKalb				
Illinois	Galesburg	October 17, 2011	40		
Illinois	Macomb	October 21, 2011	60		
Illinois	Naperville	October 22, 2011	50-60		
Illinois	Ottawa				
Illinois	Peoria				
Illinois	Rockford				
Illinois	Springfield				
Illinois	Streator	November 30, 2011			
Indiana	Bloomington	October 9, 2011			
Indiana	Elkhart	October 7, 2011			
Indiana	Evansville	October 10, 2011			
Indiana	Fort Wayne				
Indiana	Indianapolis	October 8, 2011	1,000		
Indiana	Kokomo	October 14, 2011	100		
Indiana	Muncie	October 19, 2011	20		
Indiana	Portage	October 22, 2011			
Indiana	South Bend	October 7, 2011			
Indiana	West Lafayette	December 10, 2011	50		
Iowa	Ames	October 13, 2011			Occupy ISU; Weekly meetings, no encampments.
Iowa	Cedar Valley	October 15, 2011			Weekly meetings, no encampments.
Iowa	Cedar Rapids	October 22, 2011			moved from Greene Square Park to corner of M Avenue and 1st Street N.W.; under eviction notice
Iowa	Decorah	November 5, 2011			Weekly meetings on Saturdays at 1PM at courthouse steps. No encampments.
Iowa	Des Moines	October 9, 2011			Camp on Capitol ground broken up by police Oct. 8; numerous arrests, including Ed Fallon; now at E 14th and Grand. Cost to city: <$10,000 Protests continue.
Iowa	Iowa City	October 7, 2011			Encampment previously held as at College Green Park; General Assemblies still held there.
Iowa	Sioux City	October 8, 2011	100+		Demonstrations outside the public library, Steve King's office, and the 2011 FOX News Republican debate
Kansas	Kansas City				
Kansas	Lawrence				
Kansas	Manhattan				
Kansas	Pittsburg				
Kansas	Wichita				
Kentucky	Ashland				
Kentucky	Bowling Green				
Kentucky	Lexington	September 29, 2011			
Kentucky	Louisville	October 4, 2011	300		Encampment at Founders Square
Kentucky	Owensboro				
Kentucky	Paducah				
Louisiana	Baton Rouge	October 24, 2011	120		
Louisiana	Lafayette	November 17, 2011	12		Demonstration at federal courthouse. "The 'Occupy Lafayette' event was a low-key affair: No slogans were chanted or epithets hurled. In fact, it didn't even arouse the curiousity [sic] of security officials at the courthouse," said local media.
Louisiana	New Orleans				
Louisiana	Shreveport				
Maine	Augusta				
Maine	Bangor				
Maine	Bar Harbor	October 15, 2011	70		
Maine	Brunswick				
Maine	Portland				
Maine	Presque Isle				Occupy Aroostook
Maryland	Annapolis				
Maryland	Baltimore	October 3, 2011	200		Occupy Baltimore
Maryland	Cumberland	October 8, 2011	3		
Maryland	Frederick	November 11, 2011			
Massachusetts	Amherst	October 5, 2011	36		
Massachusetts	Berkshire County	October 10, 2011			
Massachusetts	Boston	September 30, 2011	10,000+		Occupy Boston
Massachusetts	Cambridge	November 9, 2011			Including protest at Occupy Harvard
Massachusetts	Cape Ann	February 4, 2012			
Massachusetts	Greenfield	October 9, 2011	50		
Massachusetts	Jamaica Plain	November 13, 2011			
Massachusetts	Lenox				
Massachusetts	Lowell	February 4, 2012			
Massachusetts	Malden	February 4, 2012			
Massachusetts	Newton				
Massachusetts	Needham				
Massachusetts	Northampton	October 6, 2011	50		Including protest at Smith College
Massachusetts	Reading		20		
Massachusetts	Salem	October 22, 2011			
Massachusetts	Somerville	February 4, 2012			
Massachusetts	Springfield	October 10, 2011			
Massachusetts	Williamstown				
Massachusetts	Woburn	February 4, 2012			
Massachusetts	Worcester	October 9, 2011	100		
Michigan	Ann Arbor				
Michigan	Detroit	October 14, 2011	500		Encampment at Grand Circus Park from Oct 14 – November 21, 2011. Subsequent meeting locations included 5900 Michigan Ave and 1515 Broadway. Meetings continued through 2013. Activism around social, civic, and environmental issues attracted those from Occupy Detroit. Meeting and activity demands from these groups have overshadowed what was known through Occupy Detroit. Many of those regularly rallying learned more about the city and are contributing with both long-term and current issues - including Eviction Defense, Water justice, and Tar Sands Resistance.
Michigan	East Lansing				Including protest at Michigan State University
Michigan	Flint				
Michigan	Grand Rapids	October 8, 2011	350		
Michigan	Kalamazoo				
Michigan	Lansing	October 8, 2011	350		
Michigan	Muskegon				
Michigan	Traverse City				
Michigan	Ypsilanti				
Minnesota	Duluth	October 15, 2011			
Minnesota	Minneapolis	October 7, 2011			
Minnesota	Moorhead				
Mississippi	Jackson	October 15, 2011	50		
Mississippi	Biloxi	October 15, 2011			
Missouri	Cape Girardeau	November 5, 2011			
Missouri	Columbia				
Missouri	Kansas City				It has one of the longest encampments in the country with protestors camping by the Federal Reserve Bank of Kansas City since September 28, 2011. During this period the temporary 65 foot high IOU/USA Sculpture was erected in Penn Valley Park opposite the reserve headquarters at 1 Memorial Drive. On one side was a sign proclaiming "IOU" and the other was one saying "USA."
Missouri	St. Joseph	October 5, 2011			
Missouri	St. Louis	October 1, 2011			Occupy St. Louis;
Montana	Billings				
Montana	Bozeman				
Montana	Butte				
Montana	Great Falls				
Montana	Helena				
Montana	Kalispell				
Montana	Missoula				
Nebraska	Lincoln	October 15, 2011	500		
Nebraska	Omaha	September 29, 2011	40		
Nevada	Carson City	October 15, 2011	70		
Nevada	Las Vegas Valley				Occupy Las Vegas
Nevada	Reno				
New Hampshire	Concord				
New Hampshire	Conway				
New Hampshire	Exeter				
New Hampshire	Hanover	October 13, 2011	20		Constituted as "Occupy Dartmouth" on campus of Dartmouth College.
New Hampshire	Keene				
New Hampshire	Manchester				
New Hampshire	Nashua				
New Jersey	Atlantic City	November 5, 2011	25		
New Jersey	Jersey City				
New Jersey	Mount Olive	October 10, 2011	28		
New Jersey	Newark				
New Jersey	Princeton				
New Jersey	Toms River				
New Jersey	Trenton	October 6, 2011			
New Mexico	Albuquerque	October 1, 2011	400		Changed name to (un)Occupy Albuquerque, in recognition of colonization and racism's connections to economic injustice.
New Mexico	Las Cruces				
New Mexico	Los Lunas				
New Mexico	Santa Fe				
New Mexico	Taos				
New York	Albany	October 21, 2011			Encampment held until December 22, 2011. Activism continues.
New York	Binghamton	October 13, 2011			
New York	Buffalo	October 1, 2011	200+		Occupy Buffalo
New York	Fredonia				Including protest at State University of New York at Fredonia
New York	Ithaca	November 28, 2011			Including protests at Ithaca College and Cornell University
New York	Kingston				
New York	New Paltz				
New York	New York City	September 17, 2011	30,000		Initial Occupy Wall Street protest at Zuccotti Park has spread to other parts of the city, with separate occupations and occupy groups in Harlem and Washington Heights in Manhattan, in Jackson Heights in Queens, in Bushwick, Sunset Park, Williamsburg and Bedford-Stuyvesant in Brooklyn, Staten Island, and in The Bronx. See also: Timeline of Occupy Wall Street.
New York	Poughkeepsie	October 15, 2011	200		As of January 2013, participants and community supporters have formed two organizations: ENJAN (End the New Jim Crow Action Network), an anti-racist group focused on ending police brutality against minorities and stopping local jail and prison expansions, and Nobody Leaves Mid-Hudson, a home foreclosure defense group that aims to prevent and defend homeowners from home eviction due to bank foreclosures.
New York	Rochester				Helped a family, Harold and Maria Steidel, get a moratorium on their home foreclosure. Protested the closing of a local school, school #6. Reached agreement with mayor to camp until mid January 2012
New York	Saranac Lake				
New York	Syracuse	October 2, 2011	200		As of April 2012, Occupy Syracuse has continued to engage in organized meetings, events and actions.
New York	Utica				
North Carolina	Asheville				
North Carolina	Chapel Hill				
North Carolina	Charlotte				Occupy Charlotte
North Carolina	Durham				
North Carolina	Fayetteville				
North Carolina	Greensboro	October 15, 2011	600		
North Carolina	Hendersonville				
North Carolina	Raleigh	October 15, 2011			
North Carolina	Wilmington				
North Carolina	Winston-Salem				
North Dakota	Fargo	October 15, 2011			
North Dakota	Grand Forks	October 15, 2011			
Ohio	Akron				
Ohio	Athens				
Ohio	Canton	October 15, 2011	150		
Ohio	Cincinnati				Occupy Cincinnati. The area around Piatt was continuously occupied from October 9 to sometime around December 25.
Ohio	Cleveland	October 6, 2011	150		Occupy Cleveland
Ohio	Columbus	September 27, 2011	70		Including protest at Ohio State University
Ohio	Dayton				
Ohio	Kent				Including protest at Kent State University
Ohio	Toledo				
Ohio	Youngstown	October 15, 2011			
Oklahoma	Norman				Including protest at University of Oklahoma
Oklahoma	Oklahoma City	October 10, 2011	100		
Oklahoma	Tulsa	October 7, 2011			
Oklahoma	Shawnee	October 11, 2011	50		
Oregon	Ashland				Occupy Ashland
Oregon	Bend				
Oregon	Corvallis	October 6, 2011	60+		
Oregon	Eugene				Occupy Eugene
Oregon	Medford				
Oregon	Mosier	November 5, 2011	20		
Oregon	Portland	October 6, 2011	10,000		Occupy Portland;
Oregon	Roseburg				
Oregon	Salem				Occupy Salem
Pennsylvania	Allentown	October 3, 2011	75		
Pennsylvania	Bethlehem	October 24, 2011	20		
Pennsylvania	Doylestown				
Pennsylvania	Easton	November 17, 2011			
Pennsylvania	Erie				
Pennsylvania	Harrisburg	October 15, 2011	100+		
Pennsylvania	Lancaster	October 15, 2011			
Pennsylvania	Philadelphia	September 29, 2011			Occupy Philadelphia;
Pennsylvania	Pittsburgh	October 15, 2011	2000+		Occupy Pittsburgh
Pennsylvania	Pottsville				
Pennsylvania	University Park				Including protest at Pennsylvania State University
Pennsylvania	Scranton				
Pennsylvania	York				
Puerto Rico	San Juan	October 15, 2011	200		
Rhode Island	Providence	October 15, 2011			Occupy Providence;
South Carolina	Charleston				
South Carolina	Columbia				
South Carolina	Greenville				
South Carolina	Hilton Head	December 29, 2011	12		
South Dakota	Rapid City	October 15, 2011	50		
South Dakota	Sioux Falls	October 15, 2011	50		
South Dakota	Spearfish				Including protest at Black Hills State University
South Dakota	Vermillion				
Tennessee	Chattanooga				
Tennessee	Clarksville				
Tennessee	Johnson City				
Tennessee	Knoxville				
Tennessee	Memphis	October 15, 2011			
Tennessee	Murfreesboro				
Tennessee	Nashville				Occupy Nashville and Occupy Vanderbilt
Texas	Amarillo				
Texas	Austin				Occupy Austin - including protests at Austin Community College
Texas	Bryan				
Texas	College Station				
Texas	Corpus Christi				
Texas	Dallas				Occupy Dallas
Texas	Denton	October 15, 2011			
Texas	El Paso				
Texas	Ft. Worth	October 10, 2011	200		On October 15, 5 arrests were made. 2 citations. Minor protest at Texas Christian University on Nov. 17.
Texas	Galveston				
Texas	Houston				Occupy Houston
Texas	Lewisville				
Texas	Lubbock				
Texas	Marfa				
Texas	McAllen				
Texas	San Angelo				
Texas	San Antonio	October 3, 2011	200		On October 6, 2011 Occupy San Antonio (OSA) began occupation in the Main Gazebo at the entrance of HemisFair Park in downtown San Antonio. OSA garnered a mutual respect and rapport with City, Park Police and District City Council member Bernal from the beginning of Occupation. On December 13, 2011 City Park Police gave notice of Violation of City Code and ordered OSA to vacate the Main Gazebo by December 17, 2011. Planned renovation of Hemisfair Park and preparations for the New Year's Eve celebration were to begin December 19, 2011. Occupier's were allowed to temporarily move to the South Gazebo, their secondary encampment used during Major Events previously booked by the City, until December 31, 2011. Under cover of night on December 27, 2011 Occupy San Antonio moved to the East side of the park at the base of the Tower of the Americas and Visitors Center. Public Bathrooms were closed and electricity was cut off until complaints by tourist's. Park Police began 24-hour surveillance and taped off all buildings and areas used by OSA during occupation. Police began arresting Occupier's crossing the taped areas for trespassing. OSA no longer occupies the Park full-time, but continues to claim the Park and holds GA's and other events at the Park.
Texas	San Marcos	October 5, 2011			Occupy Texas State at Texas State University–San Marcos
Utah	Ogden	November 6, 2011			
Utah	Park City	October 31, 2011	1		
Utah	Provo	October 29, 2011			
Utah	Salt Lake City	October 7, 2011			Occupy Salt Lake City
Utah	St. George	October 7, 2011			
Vermont	Bennington	November 19, 2011	10		
Vermont	Brattleboro	October 7, 2011	1		
Vermont	Burlington	October 9, 2011	1,000		
Vermont	Central Vermont	October 9, 2011	300		
Vermont	Rutland	November 9, 2011	25		
Vermont	Upper Valley	December 9, 2011	20		
Virginia	Arlington				
Virginia	Blacksburg				
Virginia	Charlottesville	October 15, 2011	120		Tent encampment removed November 30, 2011. General Assemblies Twice weekly. 18 trespassing Convictions in January 2012
Virginia	Martinsville				
Virginia	Norfolk	October 6, 2011			
Virginia	Richmond	October 15, 2011	200		
Virginia	Roanoke				
Virginia	Williamsburg				
Washington	Bellevue				
Washington	Bellingham				Tent encampment removed under court order with one arrest
Washington	Bremerton				
Washington	Centralia				
Washington	Cle Elum				
Washington	Colville				
Washington	Everett	October 25, 2011	150		Tent encampment removed by mutual agreement on December 30, 2011. One tent left at Snohomish County Courthouse.
Washington	Federal Way				
Washington	Leavenworth				
Washington	Longview				
Washington	Mt. Vernon				
Washington	Olympia				
Washington	Port Townsend				
Washington	Puyallup				
Washington	Richland				
Washington	Seattle		5,000		Occupy Seattle; tent occupation removed under court order. Occupiers in a number of foreclosed homes, several have been raided by SWAT in December 2011 and January 2012.
Washington	Spokane				
Washington	Stanwood				
Washington	Tacoma				Evicted 2012-02-27
Washington	Vancouver				
Washington	Walla Walla				
Washington	Wenatchee				
Washington	Yakima				
West Virginia	Charleston	October 15, 2011			
West Virginia	Davis	October 15, 2011			
West Virginia	Fairmont	October 15, 2011			
West Virginia	Huntington	October 9, 2011	100		
West Virginia	Martinsburg	October 15, 2011	100		
West Virginia	Morgantown	October 15, 2011			
West Virginia	Oak Hill	October 15, 2011			
Wisconsin	Janesville	October 11, 2011	20		
Wisconsin	La Crosse	October 15, 2011	20		
Wisconsin	Madison	October 7, 2011	200		
Wisconsin	Milwaukee	October 15, 2011	1,000		
Wyoming	Casper	October 8, 2011	50+		
Wyoming	Cheyenne				
Wyoming	Jackson Hole				

- Puerto Rico: Officially an unincorporated territory of the United States.

== Gallery ==
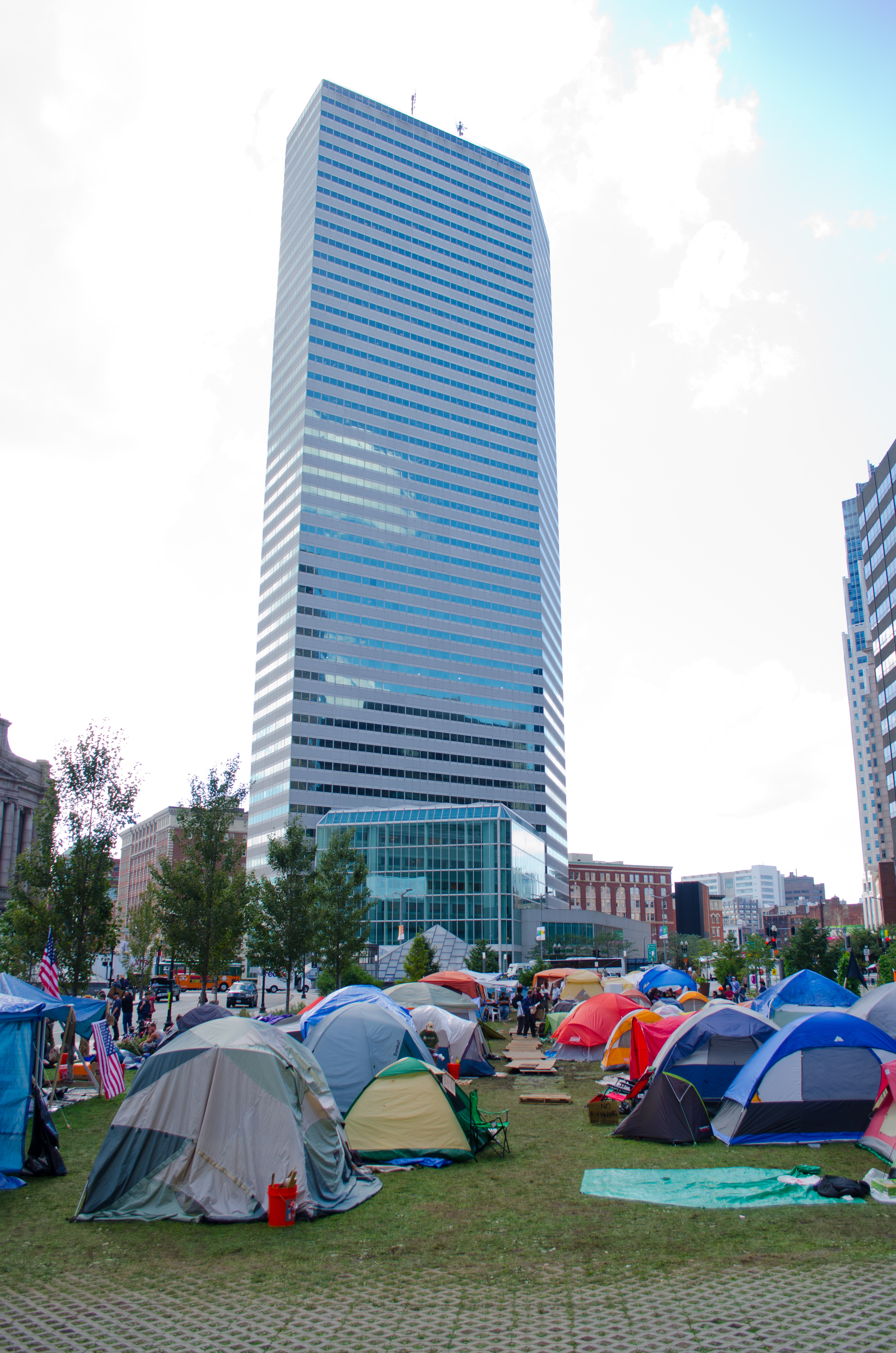
People gathered near Boston's Dewey Square during Occupy Boston on October 3, 2011

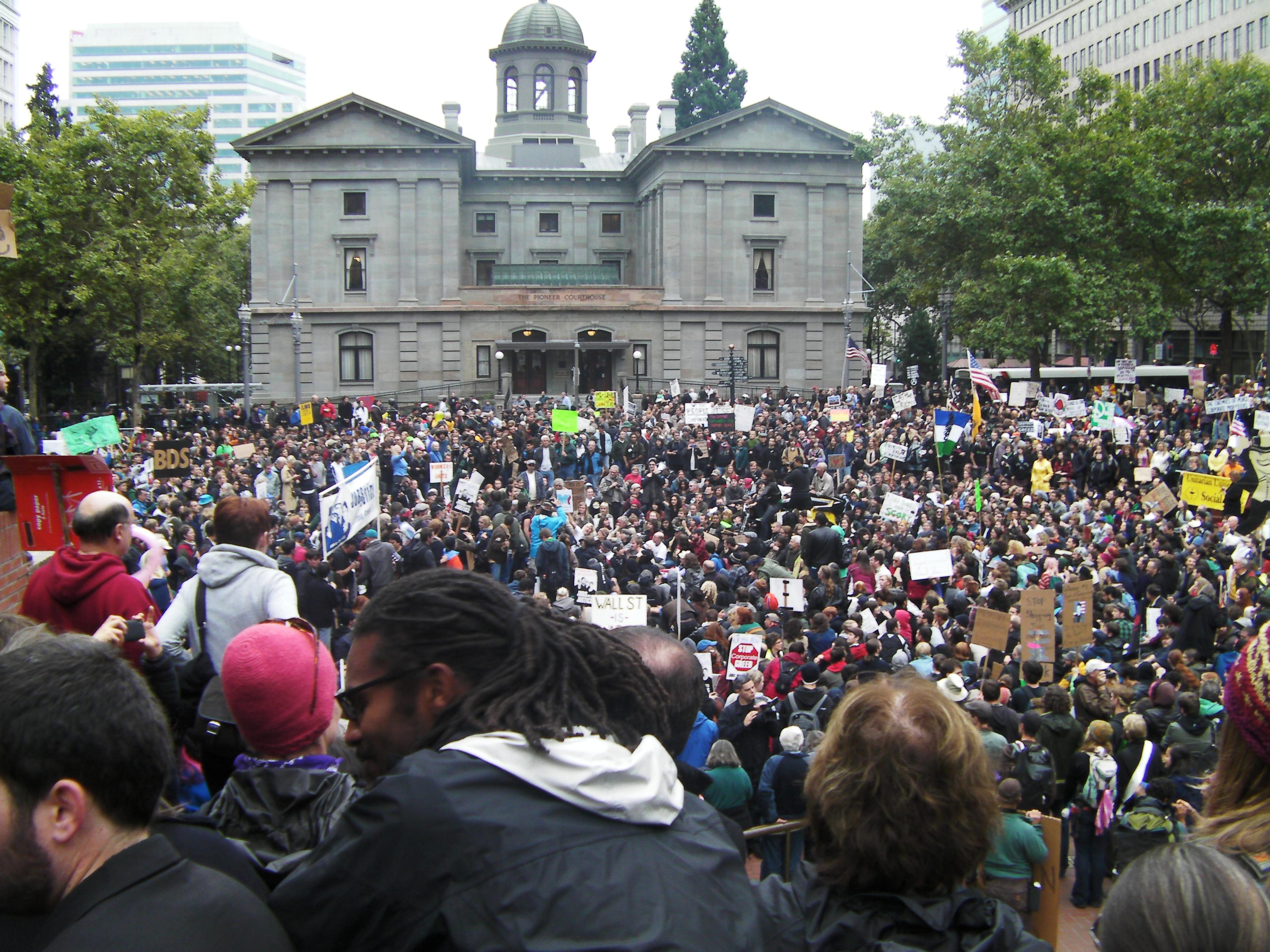
Occupy Portland protesters at Pioneer Courthouse Square in Portland, Oregon, October 6, 2011

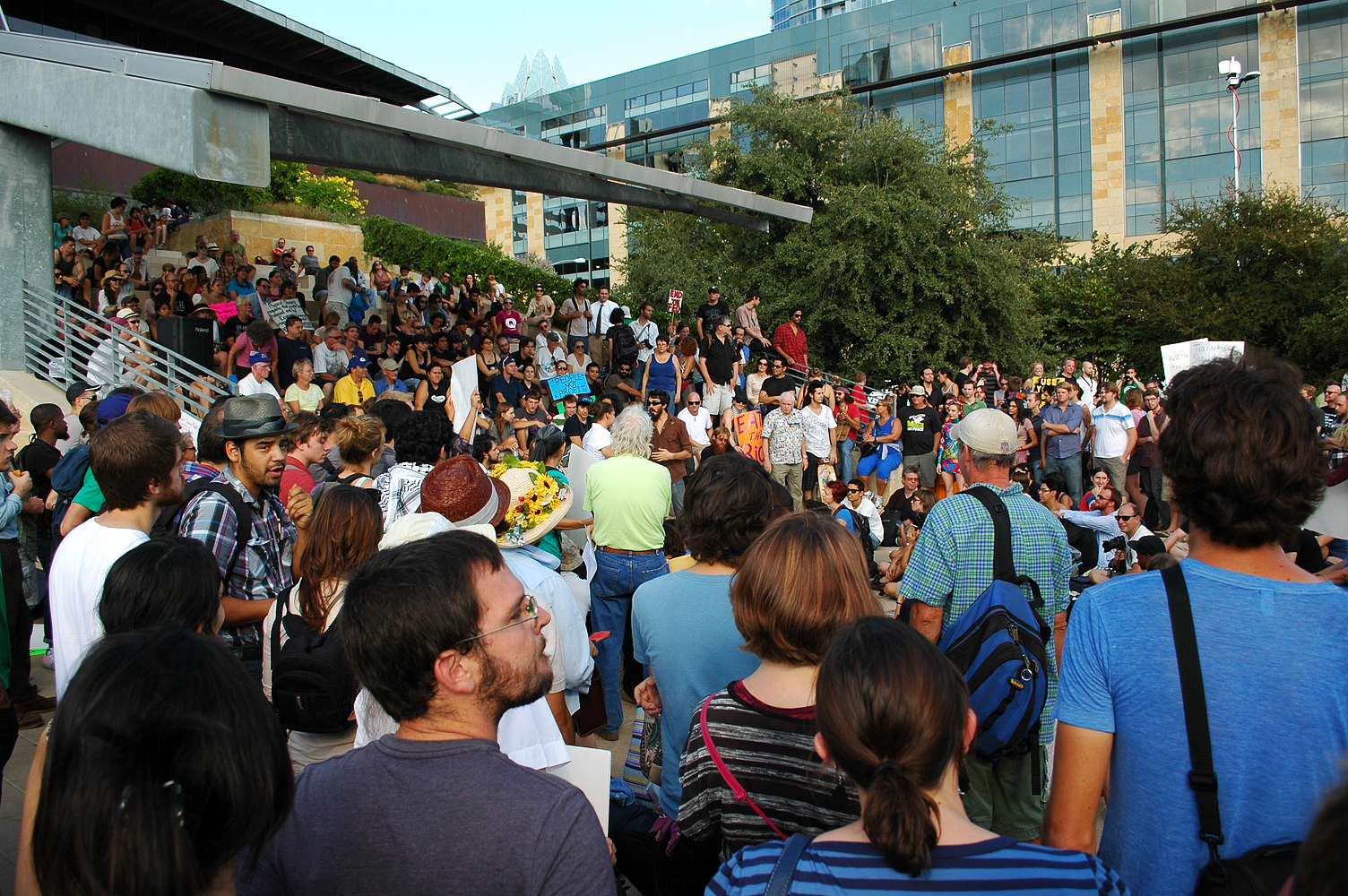
Demonstrators at the Occupy Austin protest on October 6, 2011

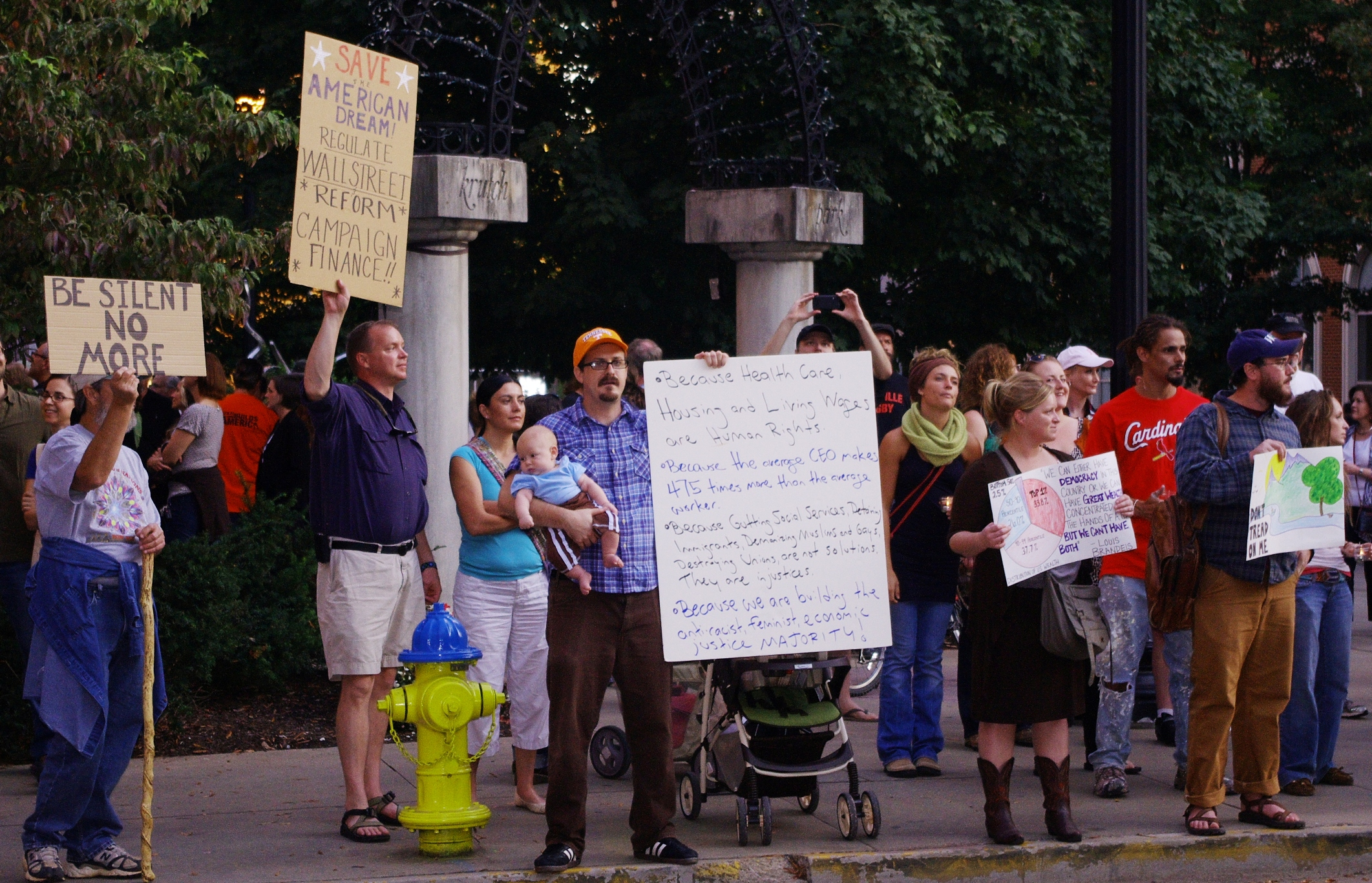
Demonstrators at the Occupy Knoxville protest on October 7, 2011

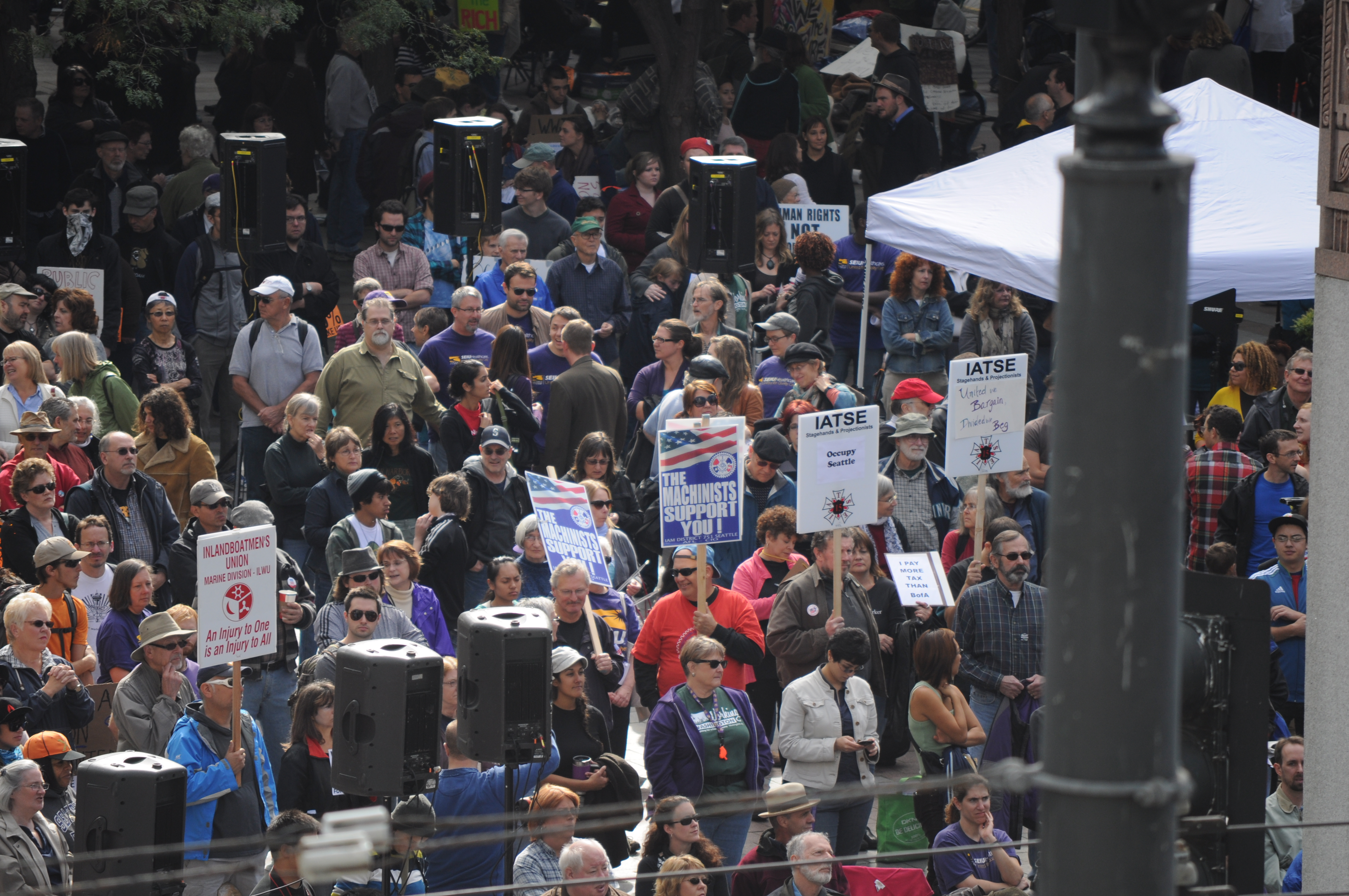
Occupy Seattle rally at Westlake Park, Seattle, October 8, 2011

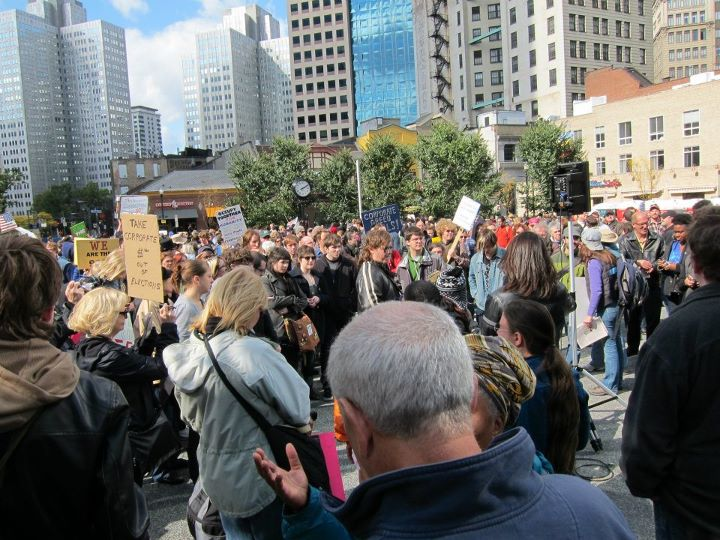
Occupy Pittsburgh protesters on October 15, 2011

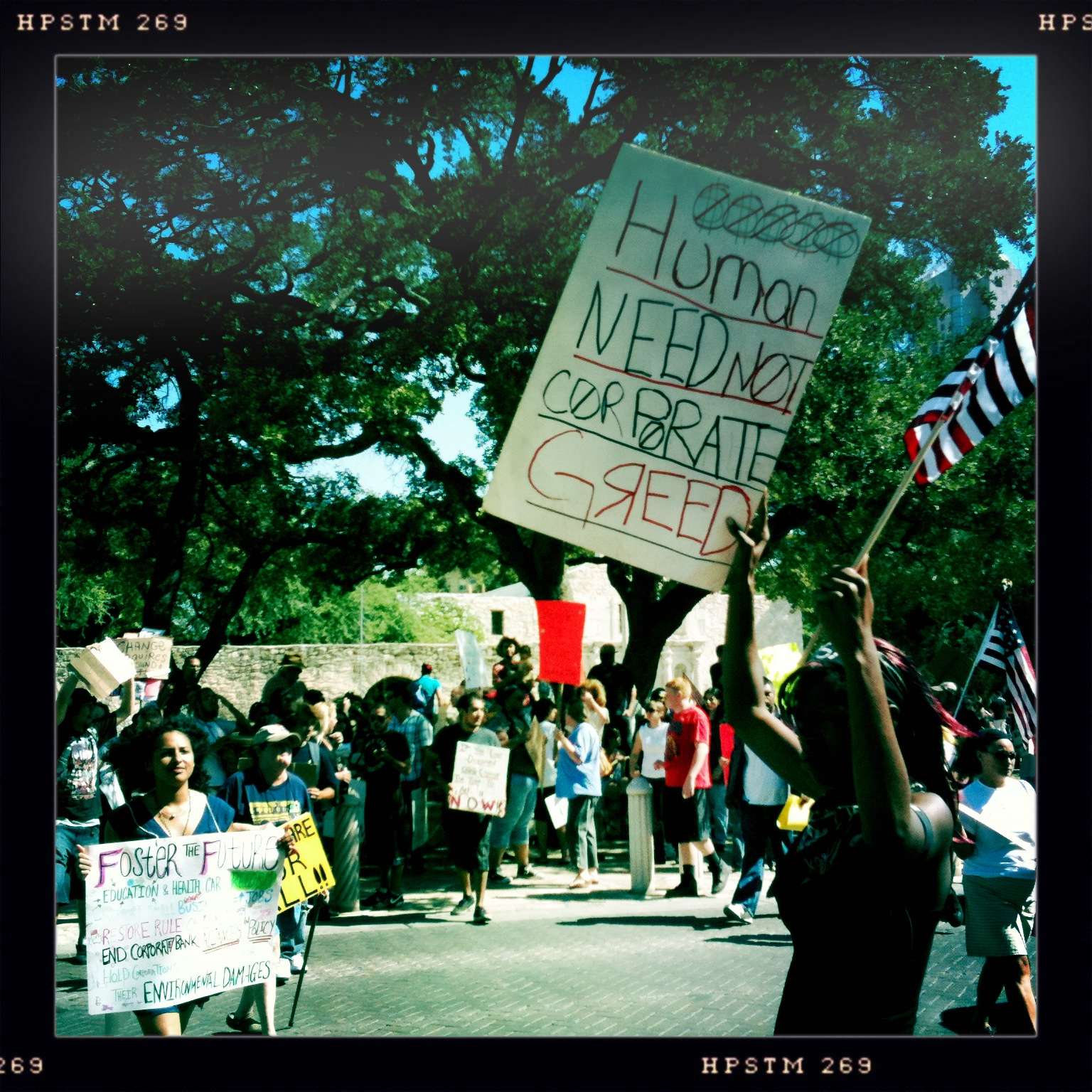
Occupy San Antonio protesters at the Alamo begin march after rallying on October 15, 2011 in solidarity with Occupy Wall Street

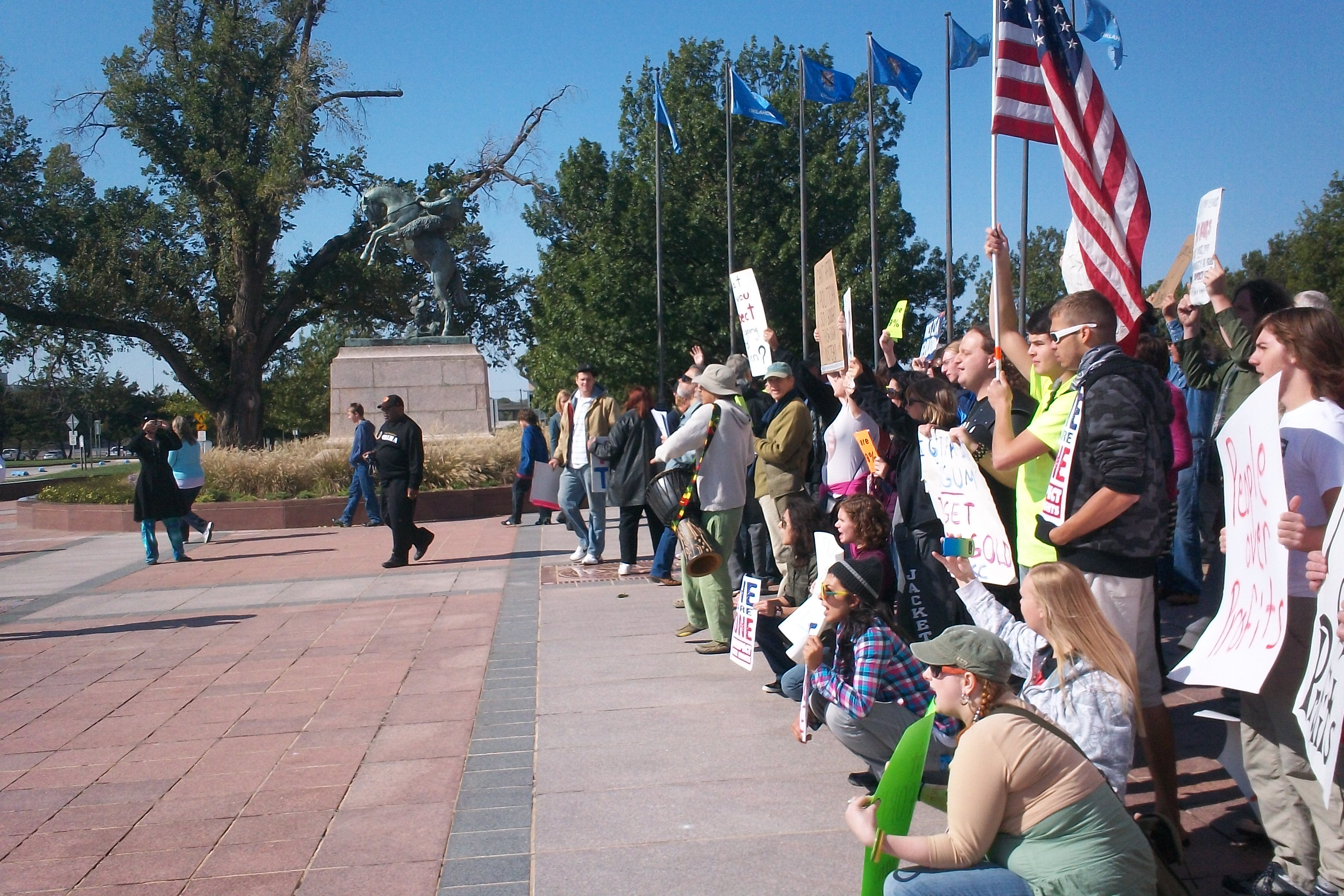
Demonstrators from Occupy Oklahoma City gather at the Oklahoma State Capitol building on October 28, 2011

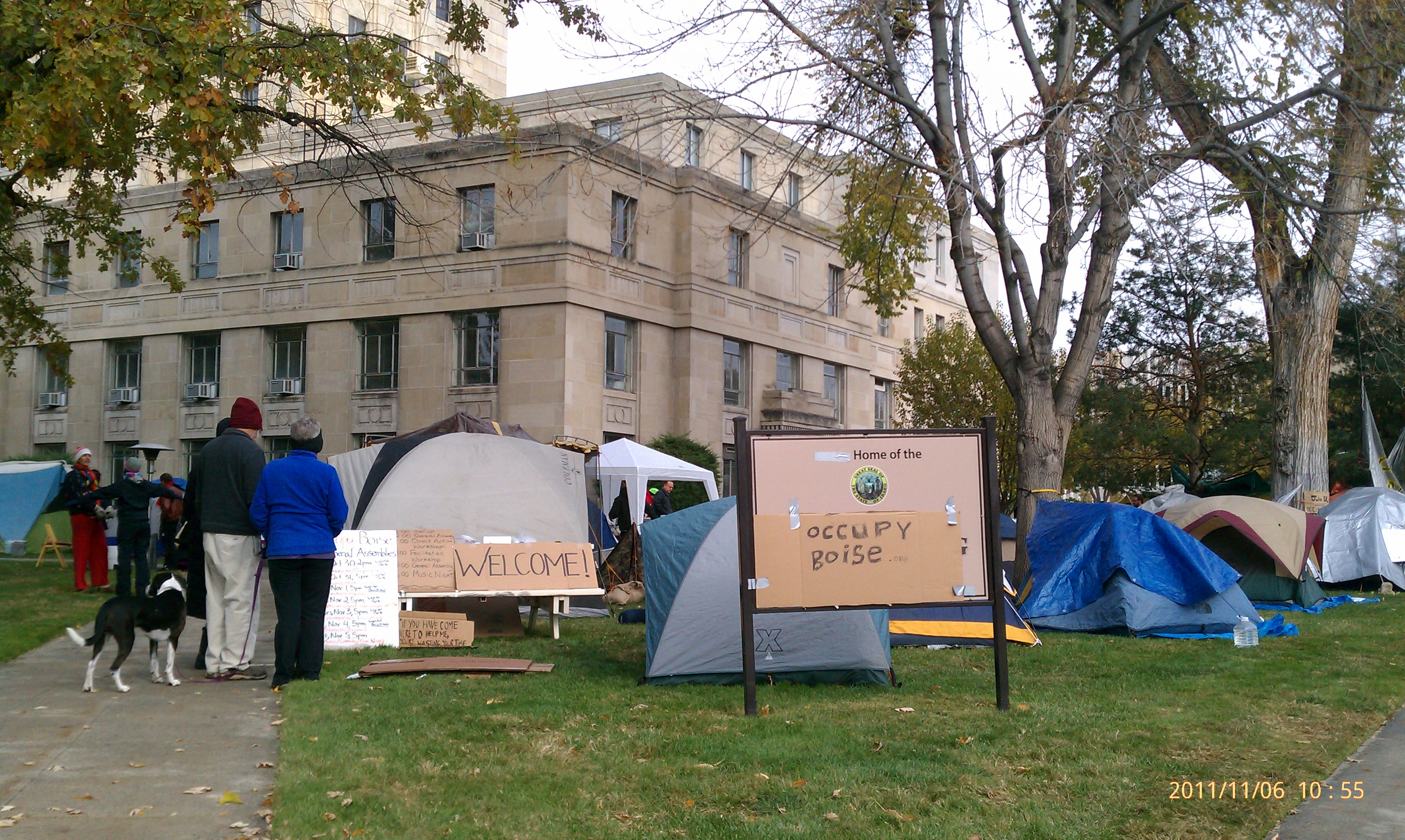
Occupy Boise encampment on the grounds of the defunct Ada County Courthouse, November 6, 2011

== See also ==
- Timeline of Occupy Wall Street
- We are the 99%

Other U.S. protests

- 2011 United States public employee protests
- 2011 Wisconsin protests

Other international protests

- 15 October 2011 global protests
- 2010–2011 Greek protests
- 2011 Chilean protests
- 2011 Israeli social justice protests
- 2011 United Kingdom anti-austerity protests and 2010 UK student protests
- Iceland Kitchenware Revolution
- Spanish 15M Indignants movement

Related articles

- Bank Transfer Day
- Corruption Perceptions Index
- Economic inequality
- Grassroots movement
- Impact of the Arab Spring
- Income inequality in the United States
- List of countries by distribution of wealth
- List of countries by income equality
- Plutocracy
- Wealth inequality in the United States
