= List of Occupy movement protest locations in California =

Part of the Occupy movement that started as Occupy Wall Street, the Occupy movement in California has had several protests which have reached mainstream media for their involvement including: Occupy Oakland, Occupy San Francisco, Occupy San Jose and Occupy Sacramento. Several universities took part in the protests as well, including notable protests Occupy UC Davis and Occupy Cal. Below are some of the protest locations in California within the larger list of locations in the United States. It is the state with the most community protests, manifesting in over 50 cities and also on many college campuses.

== List ==
City	Date protest began	Larger crowd size estimates	Refs	Notes
Alameda				
Amador County				
Anaheim	Oct. 7, 2011	75		
Arcata	Oct. 7, 2011			
Auburn	Nov. 17, 2011	150		Placer 99% on Facebook
Bakersfield	Oct. 7, 2011			
Berkeley	Oct. 8, 2011			Occupy Berkeley as well as Occupy Cal and Occupy the Farm at University of California, Berkeley
Camarillo	Oct. 5, 2011			
Chico				
Coachella Valley	Oct. 11, 2011			
Culver City				
Davis		5,000		Occupy Davis and Occupy UC Davis at the University of California, Davis
Encinitas	Oct. 15, 2011			
Escondido	Nov. 5, 2011			
Eureka	Oct. 13, 2011			
Fontana				
Fresno	Oct. 15, 2011			
Gilroy				
Grass Valley				
Half Moon Bay	Oct. 4, 2011			
Huntington Beach	Mar. 9, 2012	20		Vandalized bank building.
Irvine	Oct. 15, 2011	1200		Continuous 24-hour presence since 10/15; continuous 24-hour encampment since 10/25; also protests at UCI
Lompoc	Oct. 15, 2011			
Long Beach	Oct. 15, 2011			
Los Angeles	Oct. 1, 2011			Occupy Los Angeles; Cost to city: $200,000
Marysville				
Merced	Oct. 15, 2011			
Monterey	Oct. 15, 2011			
Nevada City				
Oakland		50,000		Occupy Oakland (Timeline of Occupy Oakland); This Occupy, like many others in urban areas, was victim to a lot of police violence. However, at this Occupy, a protestor, Scott Olsen, was non-fatally shot in the head by police. Cost to city: $2.4 million
Ojai				
Oxnard	Oct. 15, 2011			
Palo Alto				Including a protest movement at Stanford University
Pasadena				Occupy Rose Parade (a separate protest from Occupy Pasadena)
Petaluma	Oct. 29, 2011			
Redding	Oct. 6, 2011			
Redlands				
Redwood City	Oct. 28, 2011			
Riverside	Oct. 15, 2011			
Sacramento	Oct. 7, 2011			Occupy Sacramento
Salinas	Oct. 15, 2011			
San Diego	Oct. 7, 2011			Occupy San Diego
San Francisco	Sept. 17, 2011			Occupy San Francisco
San Jose				Occupy San Jose
San Luis Obispo	Oct. 5, 2011			
San Marino	Oct. 5, 2011			
San Rafael				
Santa Ana	Oct. 22, 2011			
Santa Barbara	Oct. 8, 2011			
Santa Cruz	Oct. 6, 2011			Including protest at University of California, Santa Cruz
Santa Maria	Oct. 15, 2011			
Santa Monica College				
Santa Rosa	Oct. 15, 2011			
Sebastopol				
Stockton	Oct. 12, 2011			
Temecula	Oct. 15, 2011			
Torrance	Oct. 15, 2011			
Van Nuys	Oct. 28, 2011			
Venice	Oct. 9, 2011			
Ventura	Oct. 14, 2011			

== Gallery ==
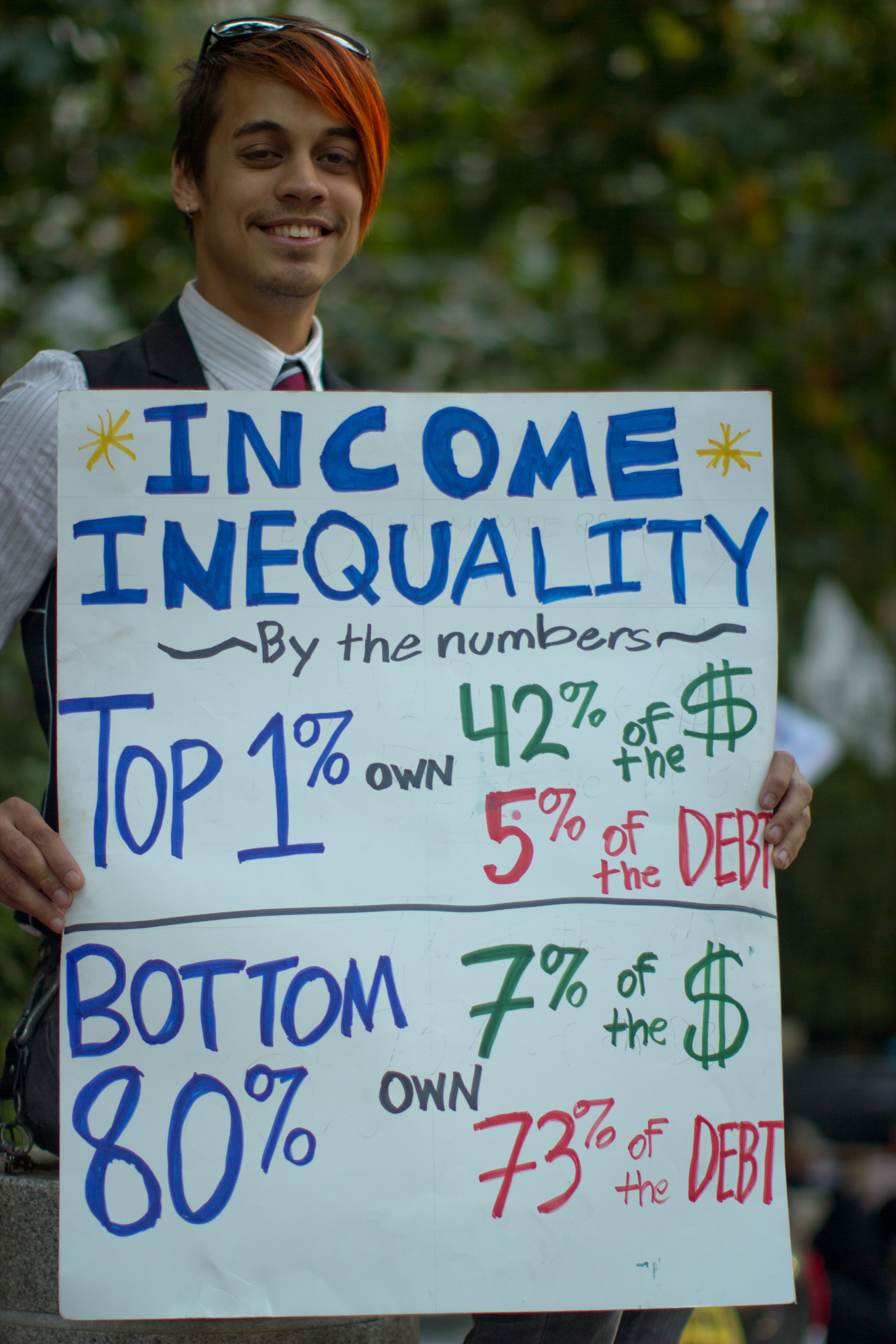
A protester with a sign at Occupy San Francisco on October 13, 2011

Bicycle Power charging batteries for laptops and other electronics at Occupy San Francisco

== See also ==
- List of Occupy movement protest locations
- List of Occupy movement protest locations in the United States
- Timeline of Occupy Wall Street
- We are the 99%

Other U.S. protests

- 2011 United States public employee protests
- 2011 Wisconsin protests

Other international protests

- 15 October 2011 global protests
- 2010–2011 Greek protests
- 2011 Chilean protests
- 2011 Israeli social justice protests
- 2011 United Kingdom anti-austerity protests and 2010 UK student protests
- Iceland Kitchenware Revolution
- Spanish 15M Indignants movement

Related articles

- Bank Transfer Day
- Corruption Perceptions Index
- Economic inequality
- Grassroots movement
- Impact of the Arab Spring
- Income inequality in the United States
- List of countries by distribution of wealth
- List of countries by income equality
- Plutocracy
- Wealth inequality in the United States
