= Occupy St. Louis =

Protest group against economic inequality

- Part of Occupy movement
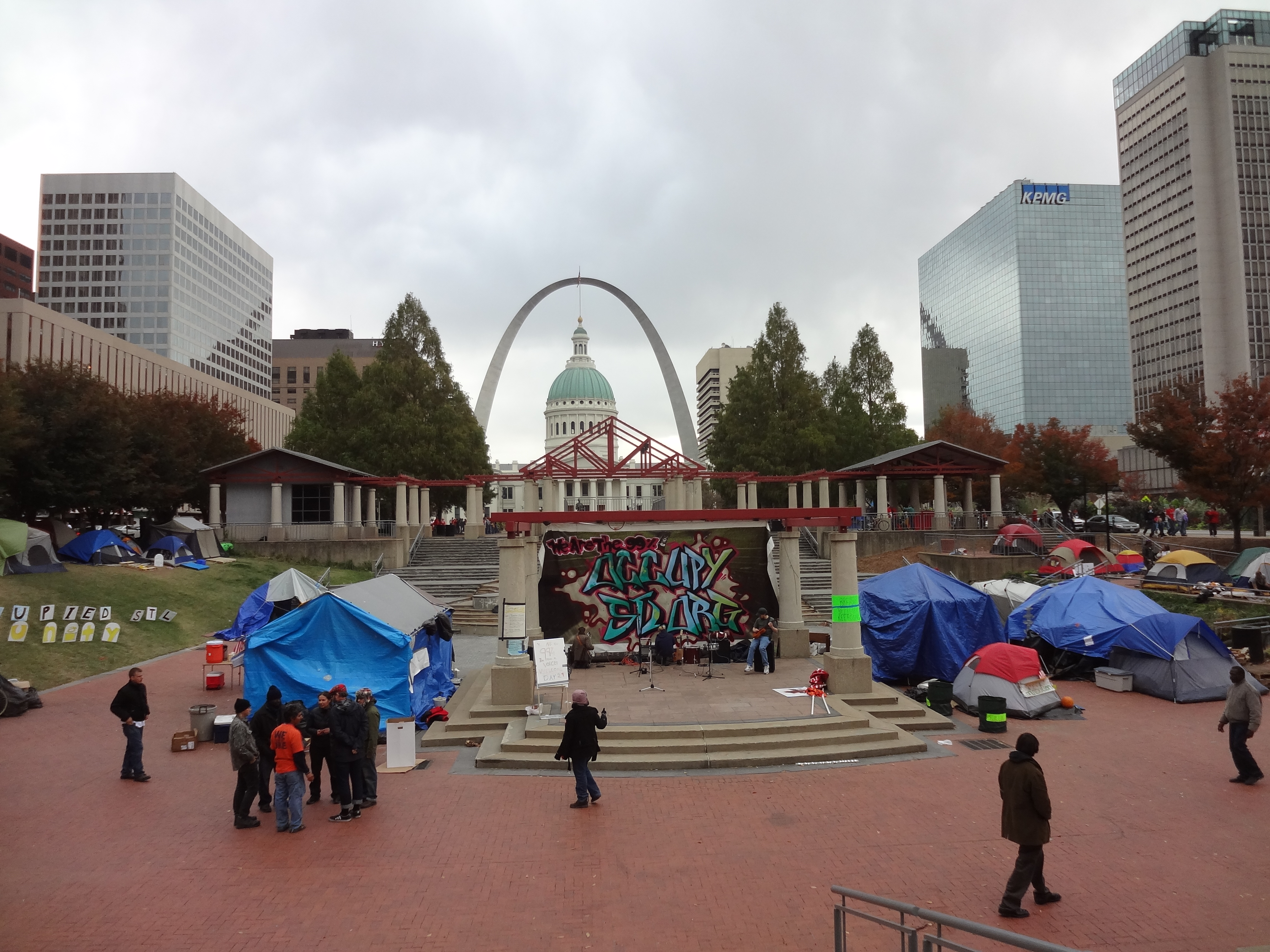
- October 16, 2011
- Date: 1 October 2011 – 2012
- Location: Kiener Plaza, downtown St. Louis, Missouri, US; 38°37′34″N 90°11′31″W
- Caused by: Economic and social inequality, corporate influence over government, financialization, inter alia
- Goals: Social democracy, community development, inter alia
- Methods: Demonstration, occupation, protest, protest march, street protesters, guerrilla theater, consumer activism, strike actions, walkouts

Parties
	St. Louis Metropolitan Police Department

Lead figures
	Mayor Francis G. Slay

Casualties and losses
Arrests: 52+	

Occupy St. Louis (OccupySTL) was a postpartisan people's movement that began on October 1, 2011 as a peaceful protest against corporate greed, its influence over the economy, its corruption of government, and ensuing inequality.

Although people possessed differing viewpoints and diversity of views is a central tenet, commonly held themes sought an equitable playing field in the economy with more equal opportunities for all people as well as accountability for corporate and financial malfeasance. Many of those in the movement argued that structural, systemic change is necessary and that incremental reform is insufficient and in any case not possible without popular countervailing power to the power of moneyed interests. Occupy St. Louis is in solidarity with the Occupy Wall Street movement. It was primarily located at Kiener Plaza in downtown St. Louis near an area which includes many financial institutions such as commercial banks and the Federal Reserve Bank of St. Louis as well as corporate offices.

Into June 2012 Occupy St. Louis continued to engage in organized meetings, events, and actions.

== Overview ==
Occupy St. Louis consisted of concerned citizens and individuals from many different ideologies and backgrounds who wished to address economic and political as well as environmental issues. It used consensus decision-making and was a horizontal organization utilizing facilitators in lieu of leaders and has no official spokesperson.

The encampment consisted of more than fifty tents with a couple hundred continuous occupiers and many hundreds additional activists participating. Several families occupied the space long term. The demographics consisted of people from a large racial, gender, and political mix, many of various ages and class backgrounds; including laborers, professionals, large numbers of both employed and unemployed, the underemployed, military veterans, students and teachers, some homeless, clergy, as well as those of diverse sexual orientations. People joined from some distance around the region in addition to the City and metropolitan areas. With the exceptions of views promoting violence or hatred, Occupy St. Louis was open to all political beliefs with Democrats, Republicans, independents, Greens, liberals, progressives, conservatives, libertarians, socialists, anarchists, communists, and the previously nonpolitical, among others, represented among those in the movement.

Actions held by Occupy St. Louis included the occupation of Kiener Plaza, civil disobedience, demonstrations, protest marches, and picketing. OccupySTL acted in solidarity with at least two strike actions and walkouts. It supported and was supported by various trade unions and many individual unionists from the region. OccupySTL participated in moving money from large commercial retail banks (in particular, Bank of America) to local credit unions or community oriented banks. It participated in Bank Transfer Day on November 5, 2011. It has called boycotts, supported buy local campaigns, organized mic checks and flash mobs at area stores on Black Friday, and participated in food drives. It cosponsored a "Green Friday" festival with barter trading, a fair trade market, arts and crafts workshops, live music, and round-table discussions as a sustainable alternative to Black Friday. OccupySTL has also supported and directly assisted a number of families unfairly foreclosed upon.

A large rally and march in alliance with area unions held on October 14 attracted around 1000 people. OccupySTL participated in a rally and march as part of the November 17 Day of Action across the United States and world. This was in conjunction with the Occupy movement as well as local unions, MoveOn.org, and PROMO, among other organizations participating but not necessarily inter-coordinating. Approximately 1000 people marched from Kiener Plaza to the Martin Luther King Bridge, passing various financial institutions and the regional Federal Reserve Bank before 14 were arrested for blocking traffic on one on-ramp of the bridge to highlight neglect of infrastructure and jobs. Banners were also unveiled on area overpasses.

There were educational efforts such as daily teach-ins from a variety of organizations. A food tent was established to feed occupiers (as well as some of the city homeless). An on-site library of pamphlets, periodicals, and books also operated. An interfaith was established by two chaplains, creating a space for interfaith worship, discussion, and fellowship.

== Incidents and arrests ==
Occupy St. Louis initially faced a small number of citations and arrests for violation of the curfew at Kiener Plaza, a city park. Thereafter until November 11, however, the response from the St. Louis Metropolitan Police Department (SLMPD) and Mayor Francis G. Slay was relatively less repressive than that of many other locales and there were no large scale arrests, raids, or police violence. The mayor eventually blogged and city officials indicated to the media a list of violations, which was challenged by OccupySTL, as well as an ultimatum that occupiers vacate the plaza after curfew and remove all tents. Coinciding with a nationwide crackdown coordinated by the FBI, in collusion with large financial companies, after 11 pm on Veterans Day, the St. Louis police faced a crowd of about 400 to raid the plaza, arresting approximately 27, and confiscating (with the city parks department) the materials of occupiers left on site. Although there was no rough treatment of people by the police, most of these materials were thrown into garbage trucks and crushed despite explicit assurances that all items would be bagged and tagged for later retrieval by owners.

OccupySTL marched in solidarity with the Veterans Day march earlier in the day but its activists challenged pervasive neglect of veterans. After the Veterans Days eviction, Kiener Plaza was continuously patrolled by park rangers and the city police who have strictly enforced the ban on tents and the 10 pm-6 am curfew (the latter was not enforced previously and remained unenforced at other parks). A case for a restraining order filed pro bono on behalf of Occupy St. Louis to cease enforcement of the curfew by arguing violations of First Amendment speech rights was denied in the United States District Court for the Eastern District of Missouri.

During mid-March 2015, St. Louis hosted the Occupy the Midwest Conference. On March 15, police without provocation violently arrested occupiers as they were using a crosswalk after exiting Compton Hill Reservoir Park, causing many to be bloodied and permanent injuries on some, including permanent dislocation of one person's jaw. Several protesters were beaten and pepper sprayed, as were news media and documentary camerapeople. On May 24, police violently arrested protesters in an anti-police brutality march held in response to the March incident in St. Louis and to the mass and violent arrests at the 2012 NATO Summit in Chicago on May 20. Several protesters were charged with felonies but all of those charged were acquitted of all charges. One protester, who was beaten in interrogation at a police station and against whom evidence was fabricated, settled a lawsuit for $100,000.

Following repeated complaints by Peabody Energy and others, Kiener Plaza was redesigned to remove the iconic sunken amphitheater, which was formally announced during the 2014 Ferguson protests.

== See also ==
Occupy articles

- List of global Occupy protest locations
- Occupy movement
- Timeline of Occupy Wall Street
- We are the 99%

Other Protests

- 15 October 2011 global protests
- 1877 Saint Louis general strike
- 2011 United States public employee protests
- 2011 Wisconsin protests
- Ferguson unrest
- 2017 St. Louis protests
- George Floyd protests in Missouri

Related articles

- Arab Spring
- Corruption Perceptions Index
- Economic inequality
- Corporatism
- Corporatocracy
- Direct action
- Grassroots movement
- Income inequality in the United States
- Lobbying
- Plutocracy
- Precariat
- Tea party protests
- Wealth inequality in the United States
