= Occupy Salt Lake City =

Protest group against economic inequality

Occupy Salt Lake City was a collaboration that began on October 6, 2011 at Pioneer Park in downtown Salt Lake City, Utah, and has included protests and demonstrations. The protests were based on the Occupy Wall Street movement that started in New York City on September 17, 2011. The Occupy Salt Lake City mission is to stand in solidarity with those also protesting in Wall Street, the United States, and around the world.

As of June 2012, Occupy Salt Lake City had continued to engage in organized meetings, events and actions.

== Background ==
The protest in Salt Lake City began with two demonstrations in the same day, one starting at 10 am and another at 6 pm. This protest began in front of the Utah State Capitol and marched through downtown by the financial district, passing by the office buildings of Merrill Lynch, Goldman Sachs, Wells Fargo, and the Federal Reserve. The movement in Salt Lake City began with organization meeting at the amphitheater in the downtown Salt Lake City Library with about 80-300 people in attendance. The day of the protest, the Facebook page of Occupy Salt Lake City had almost 7000 followers. Utah public officials showed support for the protestors rights of peaceful protest and free speech, such as Congressman Jason Chaffetz and Salt Lake City Mayor Ralph Becker. The encampment was officially evicted by police on November 12 when a homeless man was found dead in his tent due to asphyxiation, from a portable heater, in his sleep.

== Cooperation with city officials ==
City officials faced rumors recently that they would not renew the protestors city permit to camp in Pioneer park. After one of the Occupy Salt Lake City organizers receive a letter from the city, he published a post expressing concern over possible forced removal from the camp location by the city police. However, after discussions with city officials and Occupy organizers, the rumors were proved to be false. The issue was a miscommunication and was quickly resolved. The Chief of the Salt Lake Police Department commented on the issue and stated that there has never been any intention to stop protestors, and has praised Occupy SLC organizers for their great cooperation with the police and city officials. One organizer commented and hopes to avoid any civil disobedience, however, stated that disobedience will occur if protestors were forced to leave.

== Conflicts ==
There have been some concern over reports about safety in amongst the protestors in Pioneer Park. One protest organizer stated that there were growing internal conflicts when it came to fights between people, sexual harassment, threats, and graffiti. Also, over the last month there was concern over whether or not the protests would get in the way of the local farmers market that is held every Saturday in Pioneer Park.

== Expansion ==
The Occupy movement in Utah started to grow in October and November 2011 with a new campsite in Salt Lake City in front of the Federal Reserve Bank Building and new demonstrations appearing in the cities of Ogden and Park City.

== See also ==
Occupy articles

- Timeline of Occupy Wall Street
- We are the 99%

Other Protests

- 15 October 2011 global protests
- 2011 United States public employee protests
- 2011 Wisconsin protests

Related articles

- Arab Spring
- Corruption Perceptions Index
- Economic inequality
- Grassroots movement
- Income inequality in the United States
- Lobbying
- Plutocracy
- Protest
- Tea Party protests
- Wealth inequality in the United States
