= 1 Memorial Drive =

Office skyscraper in Kansas City, Missouri

Coordinates: 39°4′33″N 94°35′9″W

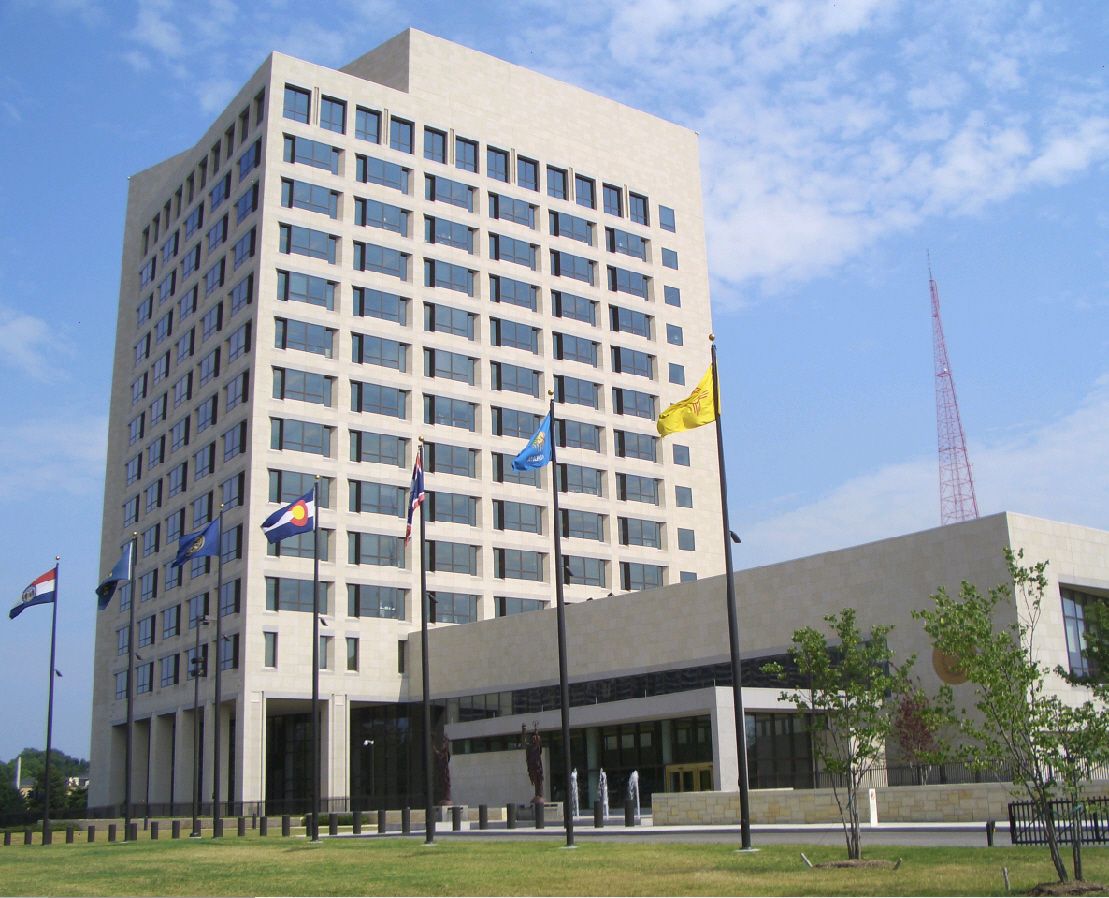
Federal Reserve Bank of Kansas City, designed by Henry N. Cobb, dedicated 2008.

1 Memorial Drive is the headquarters complex of the Federal Reserve Bank of Kansas City. Situated within Penn Valley Park, the complex lies across from the Liberty Memorial on the former site of St. Mary's Hospital—where Jo Zach Miller, Jr., the bank president who oversaw the construction of the previous headquarters at 925 Grand, spent his final days. Relocated from Downtown Kansas City, the facility occupies a 15.7-acre park-like setting with landscaping designed by Laurie Olin of Olin Associates. The 618,000-square-foot complex comprises a 14-story tower and a two-story base housing the bank's cash processing and operations facilities. Designed by Pei Cobb Freed & Partners, with Henry N. Cobb as lead architect, the building was officially dedicated on June 11, 2008, replacing the former headquarters at 925 Grand. It was the first Federal Reserve facility constructed following the September 11 attacks, reflecting heightened security considerations in federal building design.

== Money Museum ==
Included in the building is the Money Museum. Its most prominent exhibit is a 27-pound gold bar valued at $400,000 which visitors are permitted to pick up.

Other exhibits include a 463 piece coin collection on loan from the Truman Library which has coins from every Presidential administration. The coin collection was originally by Treasury Secretary John Snyder but was stolen in 1962. Snyder worked to replace it.

The museum also has a window in which visitors can see the movement of cash in and out of its vault.

== IOU/USA Sculpture ==
In 2011 it was the target of numerous demonstrations during the Occupy movement protests. A 65 foot high sculpture by John Salvest from Arkansas State University was temporarily erected on city property opposite the building that proclaimed "IOU" on one side and "USA" on the other. The sculpture was built with 117 shipping containers. It was financed by the Grand Arts, a non profit art museum in the city's Power and Light District. The Federal Reserve sent bomb sniffing dogs to check the containers during the installation.
