= Occupy Las Vegas =

2011 demonstration in Las Vegas, Nevada, United States

- Part of the Occupy movement
- Date: 6 October 2011 – 17 November 2011
- Location: Las Vegas, Nevada, United States; 36.104882°N 115.150334°W
- Caused by: Economic inequality, corporate influence over government, inter alia.
- Goals: Campaign finance reform in the United States, removal of Corporate personhood, and true Equity economics.
- Methods: Demonstration, occupation, protest, street protesters
- Status: Ended

Casualties and losses
- Arrests: 21

Occupy Las Vegas (abbreviated OLV) was an occupation and peaceful protest that began on October 6, 2011. It is affiliated with the Occupy Wall Street movement that began in New York City, and also with the "Occupy" movement in the United States and around the world. A series of meetings that were titled "The General Assembly" or "GA" were held to plan the beginning of the event on October 6, 2011, and were held to create a consensus on policies and planning for the occupation.

Until April 2012, Occupy Las Vegas had continued to engage in organized meetings, events and actions.

== Background and history ==
The original intent of Occupy Las Vegas, as with many of the other Occupy movements, was to denounce the role that large corporations had in promulgating the financial crisis. The protesters in Las Vegas, as in other movements throughout the world, have described themselves as the "99 percent." This statement comes from the fact that 1% of the population owns 44% of the wealth in the United States.

One of the features the Occupy Las Vegas Event had at the beginning was that the occupation began progressing with little interference from the police and the city government. The organizers and occupiers had been mainly cooperative with the police, and some of the protesters had expressed appreciation for the role that the Las Vegas Metropolitan Police Department has played during the occupation.

== Events related to the schism in Occupy Las Vegas ==
On November 3, a literal midnight meeting was held at "Area 99" which purported to create a 501(c)3 non-profit corporation named Opportunities Las Vegas, and reduced the rules for voting in the General Assembly to a simple majority. On November 5, a member of the non-profit board of directors stated that because of differences of opinion amongst the group that he would refuse to recognize the General Assembly's authority to in any way affect the rules of the Non-Profit due to the legal requirements and ramifications of administrating a Non-Profit.

There was a theft of passwords off an unprotected computer, in which the passwords for the Go Daddy domain name OccupyLasVegas.org, was briefly pointed to an anti-Semitic hate site by an unknown party. In the aftermath of this incident, the owner of the server where the site data was stored obtained a new URL, OccupyLV.org on his own initiative. When the original domain was restored a new hosted site was attached to it, on the initiative of the domain name owner. As of November 20, the two sides agreed on little, except that they were now separate organizations, both claiming to be "Occupy Las Vegas.".

== Chronology of events ==
=== Week 1 (October 6–12) ===
On October 6, 2011, Occupy Las Vegas sponsored and led a march on the Las Vegas Strip. It was estimated that 1000 people participated in this march.

=== Week 2 (October 13–19) ===
On October 15, 2011, a march was held in the Fremont Street Experience. Over 1000 people participated in the march.

=== Week 3 (October 20–26) ===
On October 21, 2011, the group began occupying a 2.5-acre site near UNLV, formerly used as an overflow parking lot by the nearby airport. The site has been informally dubbed "Area 99," a reference both to the "We are the 99%" slogan of the overall movement, and the infamous Area 51 located in Nevada. It also has an alternate name of "Camp Peace."

=== Week 4 (October 27 – November 3) ===
On October 30, 2011, a zombie march was held on the Las Vegas Strip.

=== Week 5 (November 4 – November 10) ===
See section above on Schism

=== Week 6 (November 11 – November 17) ===
Members of both factions of OLV came together to assist a small business on the verge of being foreclosed upon, on November 13–14, 2011. In conjunction with a call by Occupy Wall Street for a protest on November 17, members of the Occupy Las Vegas factions organized a protest at the Lloyd George Federal Building. Protesters occupied the northbound lanes of Las Vegas Boulevard, resulting in 21 arrests. The arrests are a first among Occupy Las Vegas demonstrations.

== See also ==
Occupy articles

- List of global Occupy protest locations
- "Occupy" protests
- Timeline of Occupy Wall Street
- We are the 99%

Related articles

- Arab Spring
- Bank Transfer Day
- Corruption Perceptions Index
- Economic inequality
- Grassroots movement
- Income inequality in the United States
- Lobbying – the act of attempting to influence decisions made by officials in the government, most often legislators or members of regulatory agencies
- Plutocracy
- Tea Party protests
- Wealth inequality in the United States

Related portals:
