= Occupy Salem =

Social movement in Salem, Oregon, U.S.

- Part of the Occupy movement
- Date: October 2011 – 2012
- Location: Salem, Oregon, United States
- Caused by: Economic inequality, corporate influence over government, inter alia.
- Methods: Demonstration, occupation, protest, street protesters

Arrests and injuries
- Injuries: 0
- Arrested: 0

Occupy Salem was a collaboration in Salem, Oregon based on the Occupy Wall Street movement which began in New York City on September 17, 2011. Occupy Salem included peaceful protests and demonstrations.

As of June 2012, Occupy Salem had continued to engage in organized meetings, events and actions.

== History ==
On October 4, 2011, about 60 people met in Riverfront Park in Salem to plan a peaceful protest.

Beginning on October 10, protesters began camping out at Willson Park near the Oregon State Capitol in Salem, and also set up tents in a parking lot adjacent to the capitol building. The protesters had a permit that allowed then to set up tents during the daytime. The encampment included a kitchen area and a first aid station. On the same day, hundreds of protesters rallied at the State Capitol. Former Salem Mayor Mike Swaim was one of the participants in this rally. Protesters came from a variety of ideological backgrounds and with various messages about issues like economic inequity, social security, unemployment, and immigration. It was reported that law enforcement considered the protest peaceful in nature.

On October 12, 2011, protesters were warned not to camp at a Salem park overnight, the violation of which would result in arrests. Protesters moved their belongings and themselves out of the park, and returned the next morning. This became a daily routine; protesters would move to the YWCA parking lot to "de-camp" at 10pm, then return to the park at 6am.

Oregon Governor John Kitzhaber visited the camp, on October 25, and while the conversation was "productive" he maintained the ban on overnight stays in the park. On November 14, Oregon state officials ordered the Salem protesters to leave the encampment, where they had been stationed since October 10. The officials also said that the protesters were required to "remove all tents, waste, portable toilets and other structures from Willson Park by the end of the month". In response, the protesters decided to hold a daily demonstration at a bridge near the park, and to also hold their group meetings in Marion Square Park.

On February 1, 2012, on the first day of the legislative session, about 80 Occupy protesters from various cities in Oregon gathered at the state capitol. Some stayed outside the building, while others met to strategize about lobbying legislators, and yet others directly confronted lawmakers such as Gene Whisnant and Shawn Lindsay. John Kitzhaber also met with a group of protesters. Then, on February 20, Occupy Salem took part in a protest to support funding for public education and social services, alongside people affiliated with Occupy Portland and organizations like the Oregon Education Association, American Federation of Teachers, AFSCME, SEIU, and the Oregon League of Conservation Voters. In 2013, members of Occupy Salem delivered testimony against Oregon House Bill 2595, which they–along with Cascadia Forest Defenders, Occupy Portland members, and lobbyists from both the ACLU and a timber union–argued would unfairly criminalize environmental activism.

Move to Amend lists Occupy Salem as an endorsing organization, as of October 2025.

== See also ==
- List of global Occupy protest locations
- Articles about other Occupy locations in Oregon:
  - Occupy Ashland
  - Occupy Eugene
  - Occupy Portland
- Oregon State Capitol breach
