= Occupy Texas State =

- Part of the Occupy Movement
- Date: 5 October 2011 – 2012
- Location: San Marcos, Texas
- Caused by: Economic inequality, corporate influence over government, economic inequality in education
- Methods: Demonstration, occupation, student activism, protest, street protesters, community service
- Status: Ended

Occupy Texas State is a student activist group formed at Texas State University - San Marcos. It is distinguished from the off-campus but allied Occupy San Marcos.

Occupy Texas State utilizes the principles of peaceful protest that began on October 5, 2011 in the Quad around the "Fighting Stallions". It is affiliated with both the Occupy Colleges and Occupy Wall Street movements that began in Los Angeles, California and New York City, New York respectively.

The series of protests and demonstrations put forth by Occupy Texas State are the largest to occur on the campus since November 1969 when about 70 students at the then named Southwest Texas State University gathered in the Quad to hold a peaceful demonstration against the Vietnam War. The 1969 demonstrations resulted in ten students referred to as the "San Marcos Ten" being expelled from the university and went before the US Supreme Court in 1970 which led to the creation of "Free Speech Zones" at several universities nationwide.

== Background and history ==
The original intent of Occupy Texas State was to denounce the role that large corporations had in promulgating the 2008 financial crisis and to highlight its effects on higher education. The protesters at Texas State University, as in other movements throughout the world, have described themselves as the "99 percent," a reflection of their belief that the financial system rewards the richest 1 percent at the expense of everyone else. The group was founded by Joshua Christopher Harvey (Joschua Beres), a US Air Force veteran, Leo Gomez Jr., Matthew Molnar, Laura Cowan and Max Anderson.

The group's motto is "Student activism for higher education reform" and they plan to "implement change to improve the quality of education and reduce educational cost inequality for not only Texas State University students – but students across the state of Texas and the nation". They plan to highlight cuts to student grants and highlight the problems posed by the current student loan system.

== Mission and values ==
The General Assembly for Occupy Texas State ratified a "Declaration of Occupation" which was modeled after the Declaration of Occupation by The New York General Assembly. T

== Chronology of events ==
On October 5, around fifty students walked out of class in a show of student solidarity with Occupy Wall Street. The call was put out by the newly formed Occupy Colleges group based in Los Angeles, California They held the quad for several hours and at one time brought about 1,000 students, faculty and staff to a complete standstill as they chanted. University PD were called to the scene but maintained distance.

On October 11, Occupy Texas State holds its first informal General Assembly to discuss participating in a solidarity protest on the 13 October.

On October 13 around 40 to 50 students gathered to rally in the Quad in solidarity with Occupy Wall Street

On October 27 representatives Matthew Molnar, Lindsey Huckaby, Joshua Christopher Harvey (Joschua Beres), Rex Pape and Clifton MacAlbrecht of Occupy Texas State united marched with Occupy Austin in a coordinated demonstration with the city of Oakland. About two hundred Occupy Austin protestors gathered with candles and marched silently from Austin City Hall to the Texas capitol building in downtown Austin.

On the evening of November 1 Occupy Texas State sponsored a candlelight vigil for Scott Olsen a former Marine and Iraq War veteran, and a member of Veterans for Peace who suffered a skull fracture caused by a projectile fired by the police at Occupy Oakland on October 25, 2011. The students marched in silence to and from the Quad at the university to the Hays County Courthouse.

On November 17 Occupy Texas State, Occupy Austin, the Texas State Employees Union/CWA, The American Federation of Teachers the ISO and the Texas AFL-CIO gathered at the Texas State Capitol to rally against the Texas Legislature's $6.6 billion cut on public education.

== See also ==
- Occupy Wall Street
