= Occupy Sacramento =

Protest group against economic inequality

- Part of the "Occupy" protests
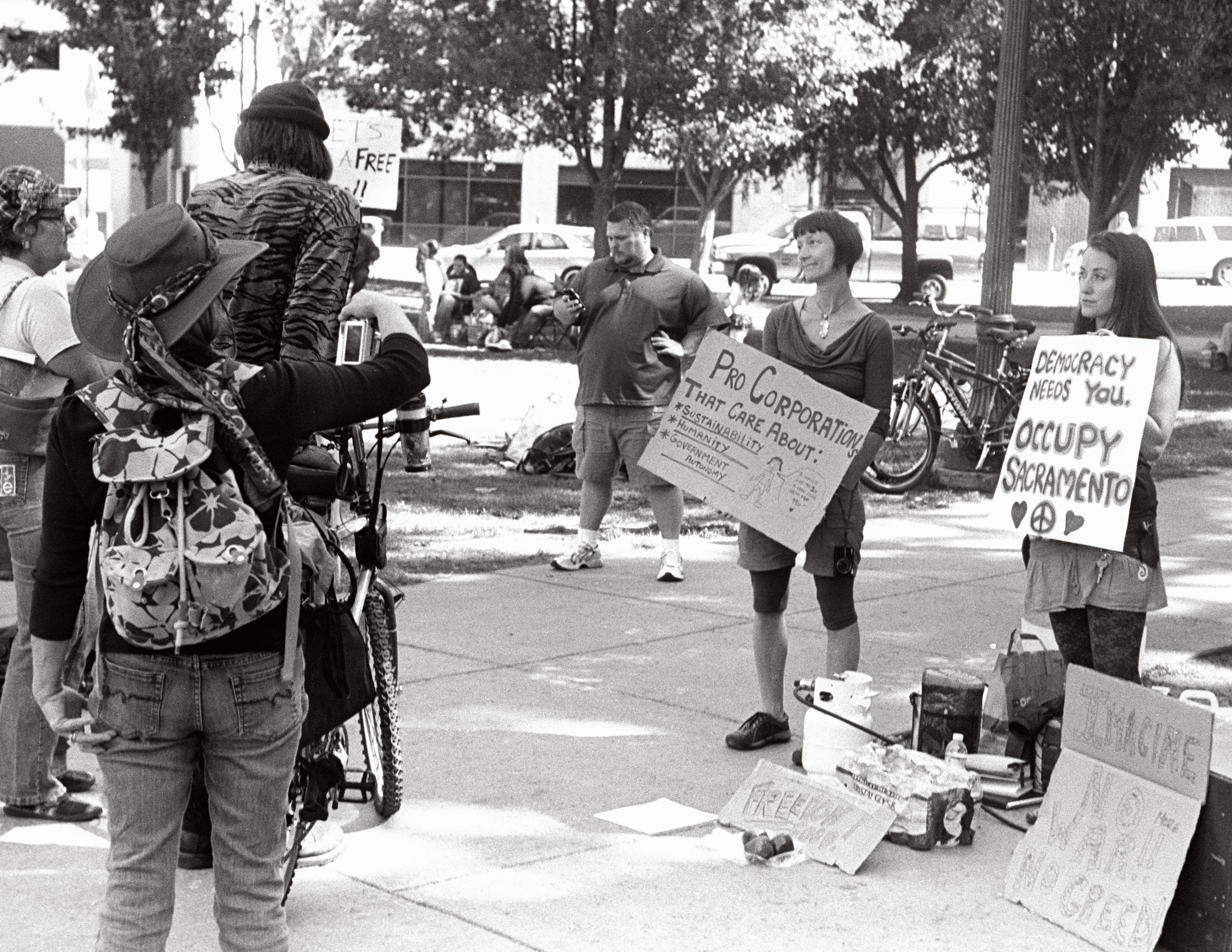
- Occupy Sacramento protesters
- Date: 6 October 2011 – present (14 years, 262 days)
- Location: Sacramento, California, United States; 38°34′51.73″N 121°29′38.05″W
- Caused by: Economic inequality, corporate influence over government, inter alia.
- Methods: Demonstration, occupation, protest, street protesters
- Status: Ongoing

Arrests and injuries
- Injuries: 0
- Arrested: 74

Occupy Sacramento was a collaboration occurring in Sacramento, California. Occupy Sacramento included peaceful protests and demonstrations. On October 6, 2011 a group of 200 protesters began demonstrating at César E. Chávez Plaza, located directly in front of Sacramento City Hall, as part of the "Occupy" protests. Those in attendance began a march to the California State Capitol at 10:00 AM without a proper permit to demonstrate at that location. Some arrests were made later that night.

As of October 2012, Occupy Sacramento had continued to engage in organized meetings, events and protests.

== Arrests ==
From October to December 2011, at least 110 Occupy Sacramento supporters had been arrested. Some arrests occurred after people remained in César Chávez Park after park hours and after being ordered by police to leave the park. Protesters had asked Sacramento's city council for permission to remain in the park after hours, but were denied this access. American anti-war activist Cindy Sheehan participated in Occupy Sacramento, and was arrested on the morning of October 16, 2011, along 18 other protesters for unlawful assembly. Also during that time, people in the "Occupy Sacramento" group stated that one person who was involved in a hunger strike was hospitalized. Occupy protesters have held marches and rallies at Sacramento's city hall in protest of being denied access to and camping at César Chávez Park after park hours.

By June 14, 2012, all charges were dropped against Occupy Sacramento supporters who had been arrested in the occupation of late 2011. In the ruling, the City of Sacramento was found to have abused its authority in attempting to prosecute through administrative penalties, after failing in criminal court.

== See also ==
Occupy articles
- List of global Occupy protest locations
- Occupy movement
- Timeline of Occupy Wall Street
- We are the 99%

Other Protests

- 15 October 2011 global protests
- 2011 United States public employee protests
- 2011 Wisconsin protests

Related articles

- Arab Spring
- Corruption Perceptions Index
- Economic inequality
- Grassroots movement
- Income inequality in the United States
- Lobbying
- Plutocracy
- Protest
- Tea Party protests
- Wealth inequality in the United States
