= Occupy Austin =

Protest movement

- Part of the "Occupy" protests
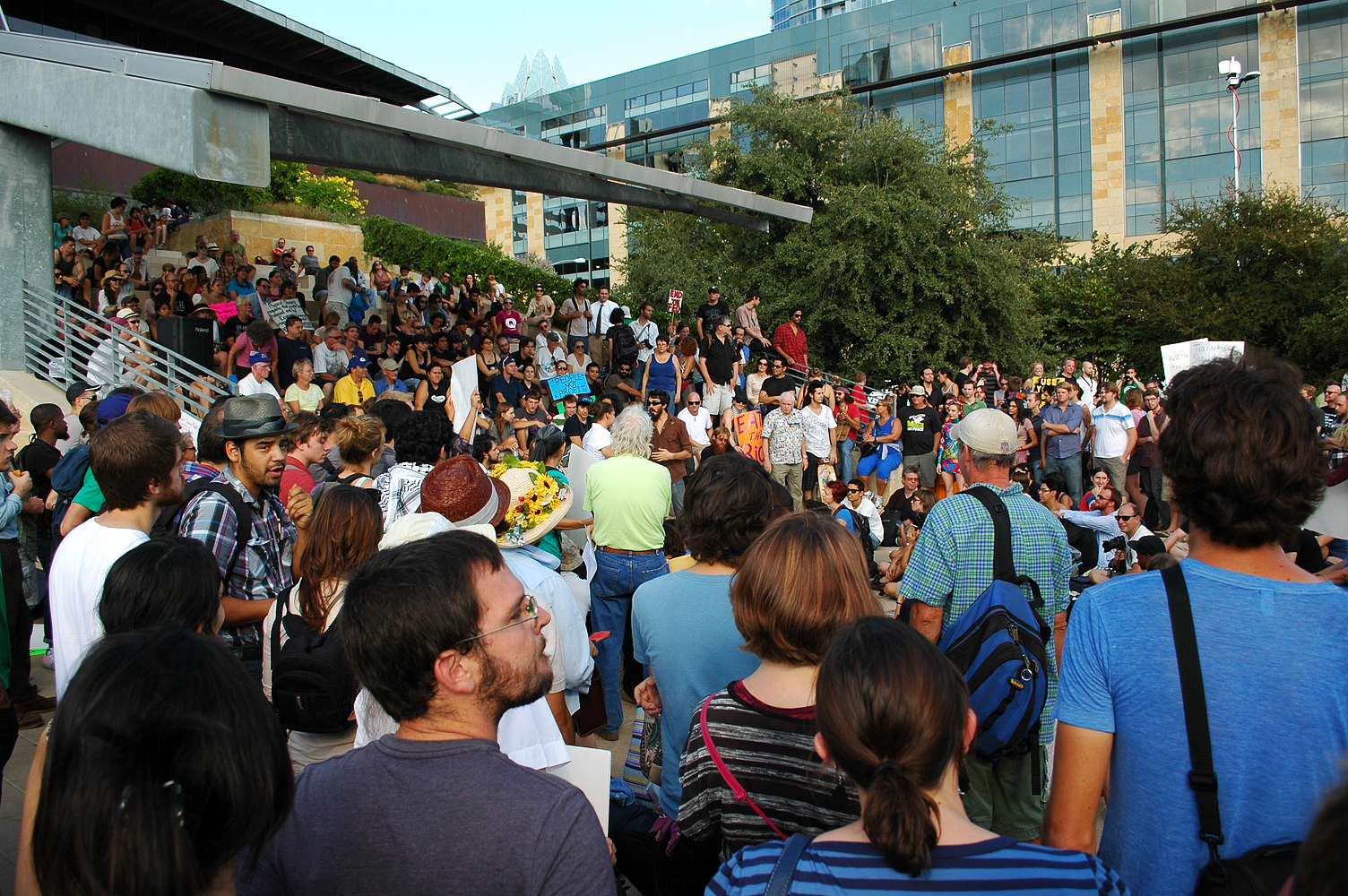
- Occupy Austin demonstrators at Austin City Hall
- Date: October 6, 2011 – 2012
- Location: Austin, Texas, United States
- Caused by: Economic inequality, corporate influence over government, inter alia.
- Methods: Demonstration, occupation, protest, street protesters

Casualties and losses
- Arrests: 71

Occupy Austin was a collaboration that began on October 6, 2011 at City Hall in Austin, Texas as an occupation and peaceful protest. It is affiliated with the Occupy Wall Street movement that began in New York City, and also with the "Occupy" protests in the United States and around the world. At the center of the occupation is the General Assembly, where the community comes out and tries to come to consensus on proposals for action.

As of June 2012, Occupy Austin had continued to engage in organized meetings, events and actions.

== Background and history ==
The original intent of Occupy Austin, as with many of the other "Occupy" movements, was to denounce the role that large corporations had in promulgating the financial crisis. The protesters in Austin, as in other movements throughout the world, have described themselves as the "99 percent", a reflection of their belief that the financial system rewards the richest 1 percent at the expense of everyone else.

One of the features the Occupy Austin Event had at the beginning was that the occupation began progressing with little interference from the police and the city government. The organizers and occupiers had been mainly cooperative with the police, and some of the protesters had expressed appreciation for the role that the Austin Police Department has played during the occupation.

On September 29, 38 people were arrested for resisting new rules imposed by City Hall Management.

A discussion with an Austin Police Officer monitoring the situation indicates that a large percentage of the people actually occupying the City Hall area are transients who have taken advantage of the situation to camp downtown and partake of the free food provided. The influx of the homeless has had a negative impact on the cleanliness of the area and the general cooperation that has existed between the demonstrators and the Austin Police. The Police are attempting to preserve the rights of the protesters and protect the interests of the City. The protesters have remained peaceful and respectful of the Austin Police. The problems that are developing are a result of the damage done to the landscaping of the area by the large number of people, the unsanitary conditions of overuse and the increased expense of police presence and overtime pay for officers at a time when the City is experiencing budget problems.

== Mission and values ==
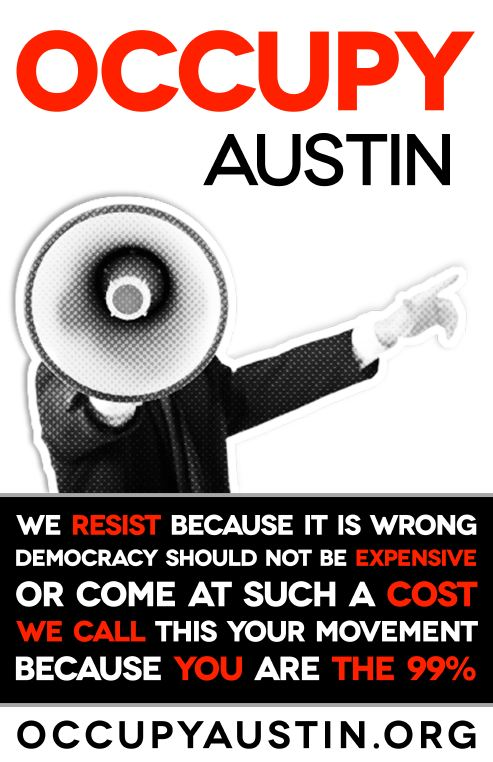
Occupy Austin Poster

The following mission and values were ratified by the Occupy Austin General Assembly:

Solidarity Statement

We stand in solidarity with our brothers and sisters who occupy Wall Street and occupy around the world. We are dedicated to non-violently reclaiming control of our governments from the financial interests that have corrupted them. We demand that our public servants recognize that the people are the supreme authority.

Core Values

1. We are committed to resisting the monied corruption of our democracy
2. We are not a political institution or action group – to include the local, state and federal level
3. We are committed to non-violent forms of resistance – including civil disobedience if necessary
4. These core values are NOT subject to change unless on a national level and in solidarity with NYC

Goals and Demands

1. This movement is about democracy. We demand that the government be truly responsive to those it represents. We demand an end to the massive corporate influence blocking the voice of the people by eliminating corporate personhood and limiting monetary contributions to political campaigns and lobbying.
2. This movement is about economic security. We demand effective reforms to prevent banks and financial institutions from causing future economic crises.
3. This movement is about corporate responsibility. We demand strict repercussions for corporations and institutions who cause serious financial damage to our country and its taxpayers.
4. This movement is about financial fairness. We demand tax reforms to ensure that corporations and the wealthy pay their fair share in taxes.

== Chronology of events ==
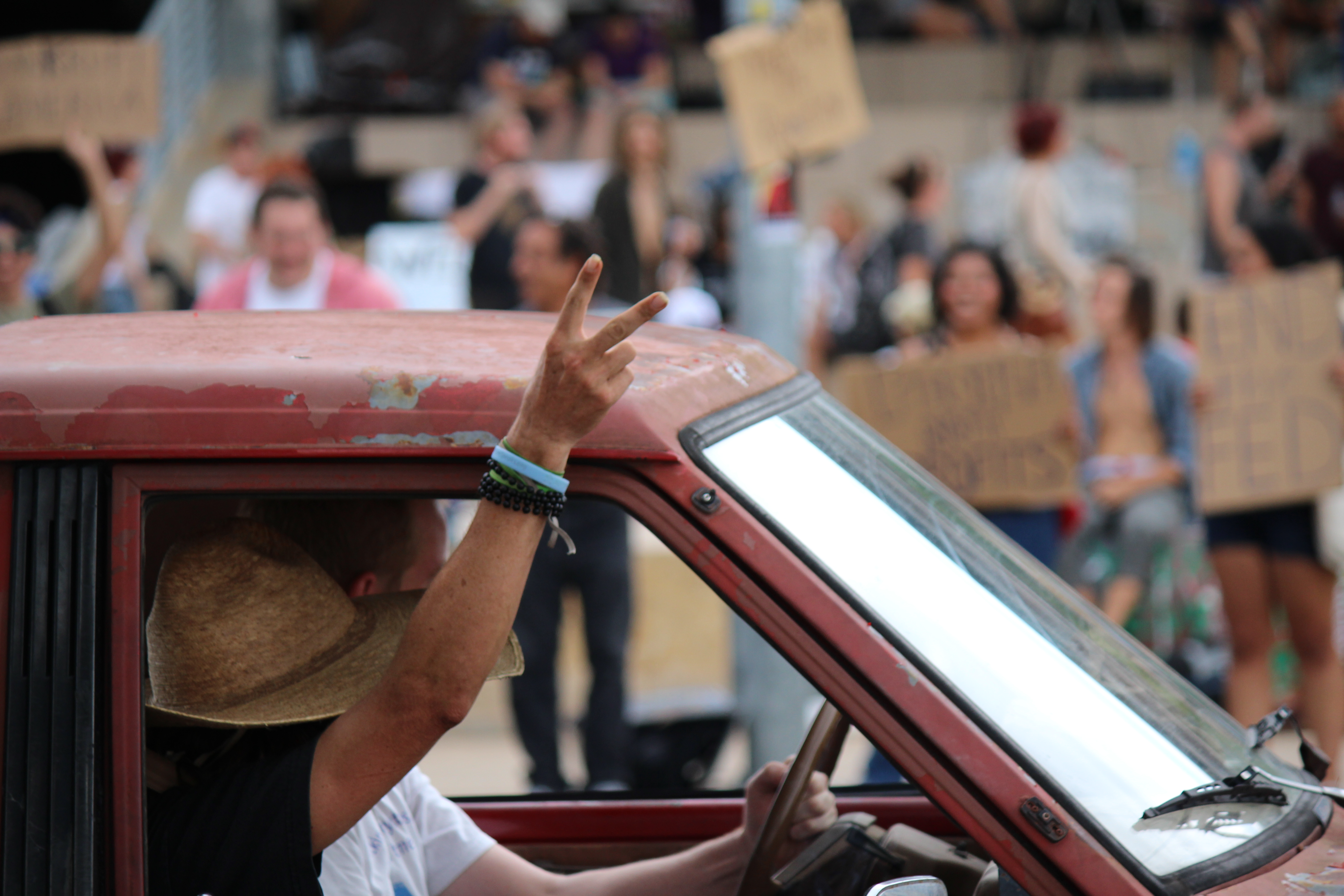
Passers-by express support for demonstrators at the Occupy Austin protest on October 8, 2011.

The following is a timeline of Occupy Austin events and activity.

=== Week 1 (October 6–12) ===
On October 7, 2011, Occupy Austin sponsored and led a march to Bank of America Center. A few hundred people participated in this march.

On October 10, 2011, a march was held to celebrate Indigenous People's Day.

On October 12, 2011, the City of Austin announced that the demonstration area in front of City Hall would be closed nightly between 2 a.m. and 6 a.m., and that protesters would have to move during this time period. On October 13, 2011, at roughly 2:45 AM 4 protestors were arrested by Austin Police Department authorities when they refused to move as ordered.

=== Week 2 (October 13–19) ===
On October 13, 2011, the Library of Congress chose Occupy Austin's main web portal for inclusion in the historic collection of Internet materials focusing on public policy topics, and commenced archiving the web portal.

On October 15, 2011, a march was held to the JPMorgan Chase Tower and to the Texas State Capitol. Over 1000 people participated in the march. Some protesters closed their accounts at Chase Bank. Chase Bank allowed customers who could document that they had Chase accounts into the building singularly to close their accounts.

=== Week 4 (October 27 – November 3) ===
On October 28, the City of Austin declared in a memo that new restrictions had been approved and would begin being enforced. These included a prohibition of sleeping on the mezzanine, exhibiting unattended signs, and the operation of food tables during certain hours.

On October 30 at approximately 12:30 AM, 18 demonstrators at the Austin City Hall mezzanine, some of whom were forming an impromptu human chain around three food tables, were arrested on charges of criminal trespassing. Subsequently, 20 additional demonstrators were arrested for refusing to vacate the area for cleaning. As per the terms of their charges, those arrested were barred from returning to the protest area for at least two years.

Addressing the public in a press conference, Austin chief of police Art Acevedo stated "Austin is very fortunate that we have an activist community that understands that violence doesn't get you anything," but that "once you're given the criminal trespassing warning, you either comply or engage in civil disobedience. That's what 38 folks did yesterday and that's why they were arrested," reaffirming his position that "we're very kind, but we're going to do our job."

In a press release issued by the Occupy Austin General Assembly, spokesperson Jonathan Cronin asserted that "on Thursday, Chief of Police Acevedo had addressed the GA and had every opportunity to raise the proposed changes and answer questions about them. His silence about them, followed by these actions, has been taken [by many] as a provocation," and that the incident was "entirely out of character from the good faith dealings we have had with city and police officials until now. Imposing these [new restrictions] apparently without due process is unnecessary and inflammatory."

Jim Harrington, director of the Texas Civil Rights Project, issued a statement saying that "If the police couldn't handle the situation, then it would have been appropriate to bring in a mediator. It's an absurd waste of tax money to spend police time and energy to break up a pure first amendment demonstration."

On October 31, a fundraiser with live music performances was held to help cover legal expenses for those recently arrested.

=== Week 5 (November 4–10) ===
On November 5, demonstrators marched to Wells Fargo in observation of Bank Transfer Day.

Aftermath: Cost to the Taxpayers in Policing the event is widely reported to be over 1.1 Million Dollars.

== See also ==
Occupy articles

- List of global Occupy protest locations
- Occupy movement
- Timeline of Occupy Wall Street
- We are the 99%

Related articles

- Bank Transfer Day
- Lobbying – the act of attempting to influence decisions made by officials in the government, most often legislators or members of regulatory agencies
- Plutocracy
- Tea Party protests
- Wealth inequality in the United States

Related portals:
