= Occupy Ashland =

Protest and demonstration in Oregon, USA

- Part of the "Occupy" protests
- Date: October 6, 2011 – February 13, 2012
- Location: Ashland, Oregon, United States
- Caused by: Economic inequality, corporate influence over government, inter alia.
- Methods: Demonstration, occupation, protest, street protesters
- Status: Abandoned

Occupy Ashland included a peaceful protest and demonstration against economic inequality, corporate greed and the influence of corporations and lobbyists on government which has taken place in Ashland, Oregon, United States since 6 October 2011. The protests began in solidarity with the Occupy Wall Street protests in New York. The protests included an occupation of the downtown Plaza and a daily picket outside the JPMorgan Chase branch in Ashland.

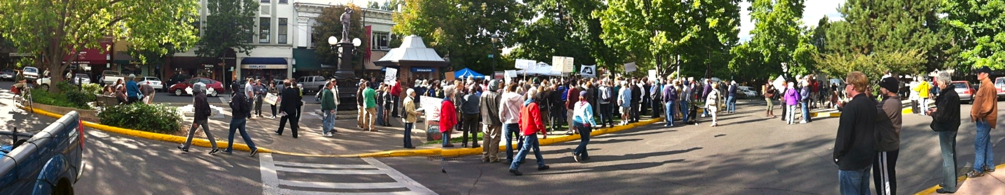
Protesters and onlookers during an Occupy Ashland gathering

== History ==
The protest began on October 6 with a group of 25 protesters handing out pamphlets in front of the city's Chase Bank. Police were called to the scene, but the protesters followed the directions to not clutter the streets and no citations were issues by officers. Gene Pelham, CEO of local Ashland bank Rogue Credit Union, stated that since the start of the protests, the number of new customers accounts for the bank had doubled for the month of October. Several members posed a request to local City Council officials at a council meeting, requesting that all of the Council switch their choice of bank away from Bank of America.

The 25 bank protesters and more later, numbering around 250, showed up at 3 PM in the public Plaza in Ashland to attend the opening speeches. The original protest was only meant to be for two days over that weekend. However, the protesters ended up spending twenty-two days camped in the Plaza and also spent the days making small protest marches throughout the rest of Ashland, though these marches eventually dwindled. During this period, around 15 protesters were involved in the Plaza protest camp, with 40 total protesters involved in the daily marches. A group vote was held over the weekend of October 29 and the Occupy Ashland group members decided to lessen the amount of marches and camping in the Plaza. Instead, they decided to have group meetings every weekend to work on local issues, though this resulted in the loss of some members who felt that the Plaza should remain occupied, regardless of the actions of city officials.

During late November and early December 2011, Occupy Ashland members began focusing on trying to encourage students at Southern Oregon University to become a part of the protest. The group organized a march, titled Occupy SOU, with around 50 people attending and they marched from the SOU campus to downtown Ashland. The Occupy Ashland speakers told students at the event that they need to "speak out against the high amount of student loan debt." On January 16, 2012, a celebration march was held by Occupy Ashland members to commemorate Martin Luther King Jr. Day.

After Occupy Ashland had more than 300 local residents sign a petition that requested the city use a local bank for its financial endeavors, the Ashland City Council "voted unanimously" on December 20 to "conduct a review of the city's criteria for selecting a financial institution for city banking needs".

=== Involvement in other protests ===
Around 50 members of Occupy Ashland attended the Medford protest on October 15, 2011. On December 12, 2011 several of the Ashland protesters traveled to be involved in the Port of Portland protests. A protest against the National Defense Authorization Act was held on February 13, 2012, involving Occupy Ashland, Occupy Medford, Occupy Grants Pass, and Wake Up America Southern Oregon.

== Objectives ==
As stated by Emery Way, one of the organizers of Occupy Ashland, the protest has begun to focus on specific issues, such as "opposing the Mt. Ashland Ski Area expansion, bringing a homeless shelter to Ashland and reworking the city's camping ban among other homelessness issues, and opposing local foreclosures". Way also stated that the group was planning on running some members for Mayor and City Council in 2012, though no concrete decision had been made.

Another major goal of the group, as explained by organizer Keith Haxton, is to "organize an occupation of Salem in conjunction with the beginning of Oregon's 2012 legislative session".

== See also ==
- List of global Occupy protest locations
- Tea Party protests
