= 2011 United States public employee protests =

Labor dispute in the United States

In February 2011, a series of public employee protests began in the United States against proposed legislation which would weaken the power of labor unions. By March, eighteen states had proposed legislation which would remove some collective bargaining powers from unions, along with another five states which proposed legislation which would negatively affect unions. The protests occurred when public employee unions mounted protests against legislation proposed by Republican governors such as Scott Walker (Wisconsin), Rick Scott (Florida), Mitch Daniels (Indiana), Sean Parnell (Alaska), Rick Snyder (Michigan), John Kasich (Ohio), Paul LePage (Maine) and Jan Brewer (Arizona) which, among other things, would strip public employees of some collective bargaining rights as well as require higher employee contributions to pension and health care plans. The governors stated they needed these changes in order to cut state spending and balance the states' budgets. The protests began in Wisconsin, then spread to Indiana and Ohio, with unions around the country rallying to show their opposition to the proposed legislation. Several other states considered similar legislation. Virginia, North Carolina, and Texas prohibit formal collective bargaining with public employees.

Clickable map of proposed legislation which reduces collective bargaining or reduces union rights.

== Alaska ==
=== Proposed Legislation and protests ===
Representative Carl Gatto (R-Palmer), has introduced legislation that would strip many public employees of the right to collectively bargain for hours, benefits and working conditions. State employees could still collectively bargain for wages under the legislation. The bill exempts firefighters, police officers and emergency medical technicians.

== Arizona ==
More info

== California ==
=== Proposed Legislation and protests ===
Republicans in the Senate and Assembly have proposed measures that would limit collective-bargaining rights and increase pension contributions for state employees. Democrats in control of the Legislature kept collective bargaining safe, but Governor Jerry Brown (D) unveiled a plan in March to target excesses in pensions.

Los Angeles county police estimated that between 5,000 and 8,000 people took part in a protest against pay cuts to state workers on March 26.

== Colorado ==
More info

== Florida ==
=== Proposed Legislation and protests ===
Republican Governor Rick Scott's budget proposal calls for a heavy hit to union strength, but, due to a constitutional provision, the state is not allowed to strip collective-bargaining rights unless a union's membership falls below a certain level. Lawmakers are instead preparing to place a cap on the amount unions can automatically extract from members’ paychecks without written permission. One of the bills passed the House in late March and awaits Senate approval. Republicans control both chambers, so passage is likely.

Protests have yet to escalate in Florida. A small group of union employees, nearing 100, marched in Palm Beach to show solidarity with Wisconsin workers on April 4, in honor of the anniversary of Martin Luther King Jr.'s death.

== Hawaii ==
More info

== Idaho ==
=== Proposed Legislation and protests ===
A bill restricting the collective bargaining rights’ of Idaho's unionized teachers passed the legislature on March 7 and was signed into effect by Republican Gov. Butch Otter. The bill, which first passed in the House in February, will keep 12,000 teachers from bargaining their salary and benefits. It also eliminated tenure and introduced merit-based pay. The legislature adjourned for April 7, ending what lawmakers have called one of the most difficult sessions in memory.

Union members planned to protest outside the Capitol in Boise on March 9 to condemn the passage of the bill. A rally in Boise on February 21, before the House vote, drew about 1,000 protesters and smaller pro-teachers' union rallies were held in 10 other cities.

== Indiana ==
=== Proposed Legislation and protests ===
Republican House members proposed a “right-to-work” bill that would have made it illegal for an employer to mandate that employees join a union. Lacking support from Republican Governor Mitch Daniels, the bill has died.

Most of the Democratic representatives in Indiana's state House of Representatives fled to neighboring states to block voting on bill. On March 10 thousands of protesters appeared at the Indiana state house, protesting in support of labor unions.

== Iowa ==
=== Proposed Legislation and protests ===
House Republicans proposed a bill that required state workers to pay a portion of their insurance premiums and allowed workers to opt out of union membership. Though the Republican-controlled House pushed a labor reform to weaken unions, the Democratic-controlled Senate has not taken it up for debate.

Roughly 300 people came to show their support for workers on April 4, marking the anniversary of Martin Luther King Jr.'s death.

== Kansas ==
=== Proposed Legislation and protests ===
The Kansas House passed a Republican-backed bill on February 24 that would ban voluntary deductions from union members’ paychecks for political activities. The bill also bans public employee unions from endorsing political candidates. The bill has a good chance of passing the heavily Republican Senate. Republican Governor Sam Brownback has not communicated his stance on the bill.

Kansas union members filled the hall of the House on February 24 in an unsuccessful attempt to urge lawmakers to oppose the bill.

== Maine ==
=== Proposed Legislation and protests ===
On February 28 it was reported that newly elected Governor Paul LePage, in an interview at the National Governors Association, praised Wisconsin Gov. Scott Walker, who is trying to eliminate collective bargaining rights for public employees, and expressed support for right-to-work legislation proposals in the Maine Legislature. The 'right-to-work' bill would make it illegal for public employees to be required to join a union, and eliminate collective bargaining for public employees. LePage openly challenged public workers saying Wisconsin-style protests will start coming to Maine "once [public employees] start reading the budget bill."

Several protests were planned by the Maine State Employees Union, with a member saying that LePage is trying to "drive public employees to poverty." MSEU bussed public employees out to the capital of Augusta to protest, and several high schools and colleges held walkouts in protest of the legislation. Reports said the numbers of protesters in Augusta numbered in the hundreds, while the exact number of high school and college walkouts are unknown. In February, state Rep. Diane Russel traveled to Wisconsin to join in the protests going on in Madison saying, "This war isn't about the unions: it's a class war; this affects every worker and every member of the Middle Class – what's left of it."

On March 24, Governor LePage sparked protests when he announced that he planned to remove a large mural depicting the history of the state's labor movement from the lobby of the Maine Department of Labor offices. LePage said that he had received a written complaint signed by a "secret admirer", and "some complaints" from business owners. The mural includes depictions of Rosie the Riveter at Bath Iron Works, a 1937 shoe worker's strike, and the 1986 SD Warren paper mill strike. The artist, Judy Taylor, stated, “There was never any intention to be pro-labor or anti-labor, it was a pure depiction of the facts.” LePage also announced that he plans to rename conference rooms that have carried the names of historic leaders of American labor, including former Secretary Frances Perkins, the first female cabinet member in American history (Franklin Roosevelt's Secretary of Labor) who had strong Maine roots. The Governor's spokesman explained that the mural and the conference-room names were “not in keeping with the department's pro-business goals.

Despite protests, on March 28 it was disclosed that the murals had been removed over the weekend. In a statement LePage's press secretary said, "The mural has been removed and is in storage awaiting relocation to a more appropriate venue." Some Maine residents are protesting the removal. On April 2, the federal government, who granted US$60,000 to the State of Maine to have the mural painted and installed, asked LePage to return the $60,000 or put the mural back up.

Protesters, numbering at about 350 people, have maintained a presence in the capitol, even after LePage left for a vacation in Jamaica. Some protesters held signs comparing LePage to dictators such as Muammar Gaddafi, Hosni Mubarak and Benito Mussolini. Others wore stickers and T-shirts with 61% written on them, referencing that 61% of voters had voted for someone other than LePage in the 2010 Maine gubernatorial election.

== Massachusetts ==
=== Proposed Legislation and protests ===
Democratic Governor Deval Patrick's agenda included proposals to restrict the collective bargaining power of municipal unions over health care plan design and to increase the retirement age in order to reduce the unfunded liability in the pension system. Restrictions to collective-bargaining rights were seen as unlikely to pass the Democratic-controlled Legislature. Although Patrick supported limited restrictions on some aspects of health care plans for municipal employees, he has spoken against broader proposals against overall collective bargaining rights. On April 27, the Democratic-controlled Massachusetts House of Representatives voted overwhelmingly in favor with a vote of 111–42 to change collective bargaining rights of municipal employee unions with regards to health care.

The legislation, which ultimately passed, created a process for municipalities to force their unions to the bargaining table regarding health care plan design or be moved into the state Group Insurance Commission pool, which has significantly more bargaining power and leeway in plan design than municipal plans (and thus much lower costs). State employees were unaffected as they already used the GIC, and municipal employees retain the right to collectively bargain premium contributions to their plans, GIC or otherwise. However, the legislation ran contrary to the national trend in which the Democratic Party at the federal and state level were opposing all measures to change collective bargaining rights.

Pro-union protesters gathered at Beacon Hill in Boston on February 22. The counter rally, held by tea partiers, took place at the foot of the Statehouse. Smaller groups, maximum 300, have gathered around the state following the February protest.

== Michigan ==
=== Proposed Legislation and protests ===
Democrats in the Republican-dominated legislature have proposed an amendment to guarantee collective bargaining rights to state workers. The amendment would need a public vote to become part of the constitution. The amendment is unlikely to get the two-thirds vote it would need to appear on the public ballot. Both chambers of the state legislature have passed bills that would give state-appointed Emergency Financial Managers the power to break contracts in the event of a municipal "financial emergency".

Michigan firefighters and other union members were at the Capitol in protest of anti-union legislation on March 8. Roughly 200 gathered outside the capitol in Lansing on April 4.

== Minnesota ==
More info

== Missouri ==
=== Proposed Legislation and protests ===
Senate President Pro Tem Rob Mayer, a Republican, said on February 24 that he plans to propose a “right-to-work” bill next week. The Missouri Chamber of Commerce has announced its support of the bill, and both chambers of the legislature are controlled by Republicans. Democratic Governor Jay Nixon has yet to communicate his stance on the issue.

Wisconsin-style protests haven't occurred, but Senate President Rob Mayer told the St. Louis Post-Dispatch: “I’m aware that [protests] could take place and happen, but it will in no way keep me from moving forward with trying to implement the law.”

== Montana ==
More info

== Nebraska ==
=== Proposed Legislation and protests ===
A proposed bill and constitutional amendment introduced by State Senator John Nelson (Republican) called for abolishing collective bargaining and the Nebraska Commission of Industrial Relations. The state commission resolves impasses in wage and benefit negotiations for public workers. Other bills call for changes in the commission's powers, including removing teachers unions from its jurisdiction. Governor Dave Heineman (Republican), says he favors “meaningful and significant” changes.

== Nevada ==
=== Proposed Legislation and protests ===
Republican lawmakers and former Republican Governor Jim Gibbons drafted a bill in 2010 to end collective bargaining. In February, newly elected Republican Governor Brian Sandoval asked legislators to ignore his predecessor's collective-bargaining plan. Sandoval's decision, combined with the obstacle of a Democratic-controlled House and Senate, makes such a measure highly unlikely to pass. Assembly Minority Leader Pete Goicoechea said the Republican caucus would be flexible in order to avoid a Wisconsin-style showdown.

Nevada's public employees held rallies in Carson City on April 4 to protest the proposed “attacks” on their rights.

== New Hampshire ==
=== Proposed Legislation and protests ===
A bill passed by the New Hampshire House would forbid collective bargaining agreements that require employees to join a union.

An amendment to the state budget bill, HB2, was proposed on March 22, 2011. The bill would effectively end collective bargaining in the state by de-certifying unions whose contracts expired. The amendment text is as follows

Rep Kurk, Hills. 7
March 22, 2011
2011-1148h
10/09

Draft Amendment to HB 2-FN-A-LOCAL
Impasse in Collective Bargaining. RSA 273·A: 12, VII 18 repealed and re-enacted to read as follows:
VII. For any collective bargaining agreement entered into by the parties after the effective date of this paragraph, if the impasse is not resolved at the time of the expiration of the parties' agreement, the terms of the collective bargaining agreement shall cease and all employees subject to the agreement shall become at-will employees whose salaries, benefits, and terms and conditions of employment shall be at the discretion of the employer.

On March 30, the New Hampshire House of Representatives passed a bill that ended nearly all collective bargaining rights for state workers. "There is no way" the measure will clear the Senate, said Carole Alfano, the Senate communications director. "It has absolutely zero support.". However, the New Hampshire Senate has an overwhelming Republican majority with 19 of the 24 members being Republicans. Democratic governor John Lynch opposes the bill.

On March 31, local religious leaders held a prayer and fasting vigil in the statehouse outside House Speaker Bill O'Brien's office. Meanwhile, thousands of concerned citizens held a rally outside to oppose the proposed budget and the attached amendment.

== New Jersey ==
=== Proposed Legislation and protests ===
Republican Governor Chris Christie's proposal for pension reform plans to dock more pay from state workers. He did not propose restricting collective bargaining because Democrats control the Legislature.

New Jersey union groups called for a solidarity rally for Wisconsin's public workers outside the statehouse in Trenton on February 25. The state teachers union, police and firefighters, CWA and AFL-CIO planned to send protesters to a workers' rights rally at the Statehouse on June 16.

== New Mexico ==
=== Proposed Legislation and protests ===
A bill has been filed in committee that would limit the collective bargaining rights of workers.

== North Carolina ==
More info

== Ohio ==
=== Proposed Legislation and protests ===
Republican Governor John Kasich supported a Senate bill (SB 5) that would eliminate collective bargaining for state-government employees. Senate Democrats’ attempt to kill the bill with a statewide referendum. They collected 1.3 million signatures against the bill and has been defeated as Issue 2 in this November's election ballot.

On the night of the bill's signing, thousands of demonstrators protested outside the statehouse in Columbus.

== Oklahoma ==
=== Proposed Legislation and protests ===
Republican leadership proposed amendments to limit the strength of city employee unions. Most state employees in Oklahoma are not allowed to unionize. The bills would repeal collective bargaining rights and change how cities handle disputes with public safety unions. With Republicans dominating the state's government, the bill has a good shot at passing. One bill in the state House by Representative Mark McCullough (R-Sapulpa), and approved by House Economic Development, Tourism and Financial Services Committee, proposed altering the Oklahoma Firefighters Pension and Retirement System.

On March 9, 2011, hundreds of Oklahoma firefighters went to the state capitol to protest against proposed changes in their pension benefits. The president of the International Association of Firefighters said he was concerned about the "tone of the legislature", and that "public employees seem to be the scapegoat". Nearly 400 union workers rallied outside the capitol in Oklahoma City on April 4.

== Pennsylvania ==
More info

== Tennessee ==
=== Proposed legislation and protests ===
Republican Governor Bill Haslam's budget did not call for collective-bargaining reforms, but a Senate bill threatened to take away those rights for teachers. The Senate bill, which once seemed likely to pass, has been met with sharp opposition from the public. On April 7, the bill was sent back to the education committee for revisions yet to be determined.

A rally organized by local MoveOn.org members as part of the nationwide day of action of Rallies to Save the American Dream was held on Saturday, February 26 on Legislative Plaza on the south side of the Tennessee State Capitol. About 500 attended by organizer counts, but only 200 according to media accounts. The rally was both to stand with Wisconsin, and also to protest the proposed Tennessee legislation.

On March 5 nearly 3,000 rallied on Legislative Plaza in a rally and march organized by the Tennessee Education Association, the state affiliate of the National Education Association. Teachers, union members, activists, and other supporters rallied against the proposed legislation. Dennis Van Roekel, national President of NEA flew in from Arizona to speak to the crowd. A number of Democratic elected officials spoke and were in attendance. A protest of hundreds on March 15 came to a head when police physically dragged seven teachers out of the Senate committee hearing.

== Virginia ==
More info

== Washington ==
=== Proposed Legislation and protests ===
There was a Republican-sponsored Senate bill that would restrict collective-bargaining rights for the state. The bill has little chance of passing because Democrats control the governor's mansion and both legislative chambers.

Amendments to collective bargaining have not come to fruition; about 400 demonstrators protesting budget cuts to state programs gathered at the Capitol on April 6.

== West Virginia ==
Public-sector workers in West Virginia protested to demand better pay and working conditions. State employees are asking for the elimination of a 2005 pay freeze, a 3% cost-of-living adjustment, and seniority rights. Workers also want the state to fund the West Virginia Occupational and Safety Act, which was passed in 1987 to regulate workplace safety but has never been funded.

== Wisconsin ==
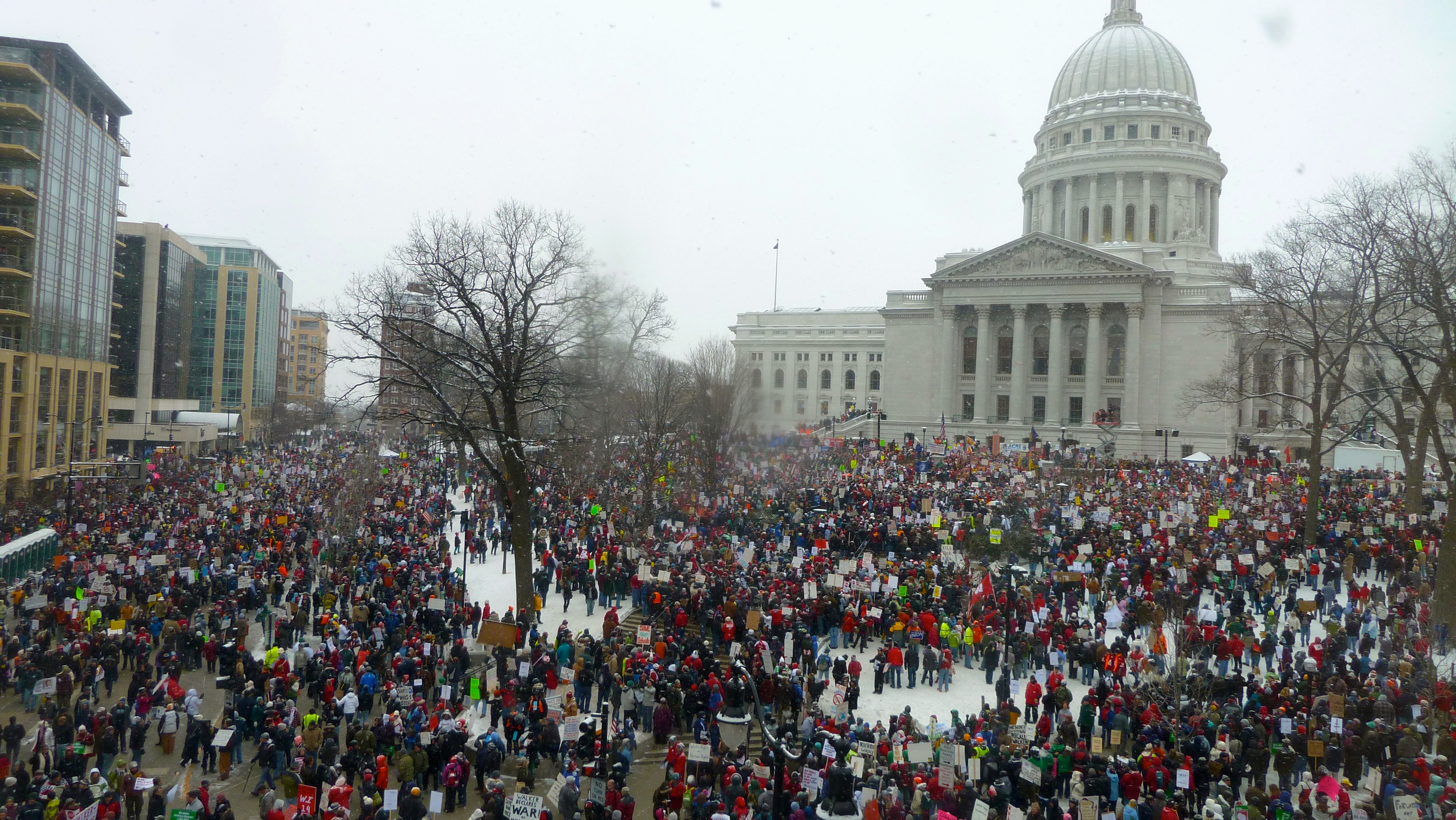
Thousands gather outside of the Wisconsin Capitol building to protest Governor Walker's bill. The gathering is estimated at 70,000 to 100,000 people.

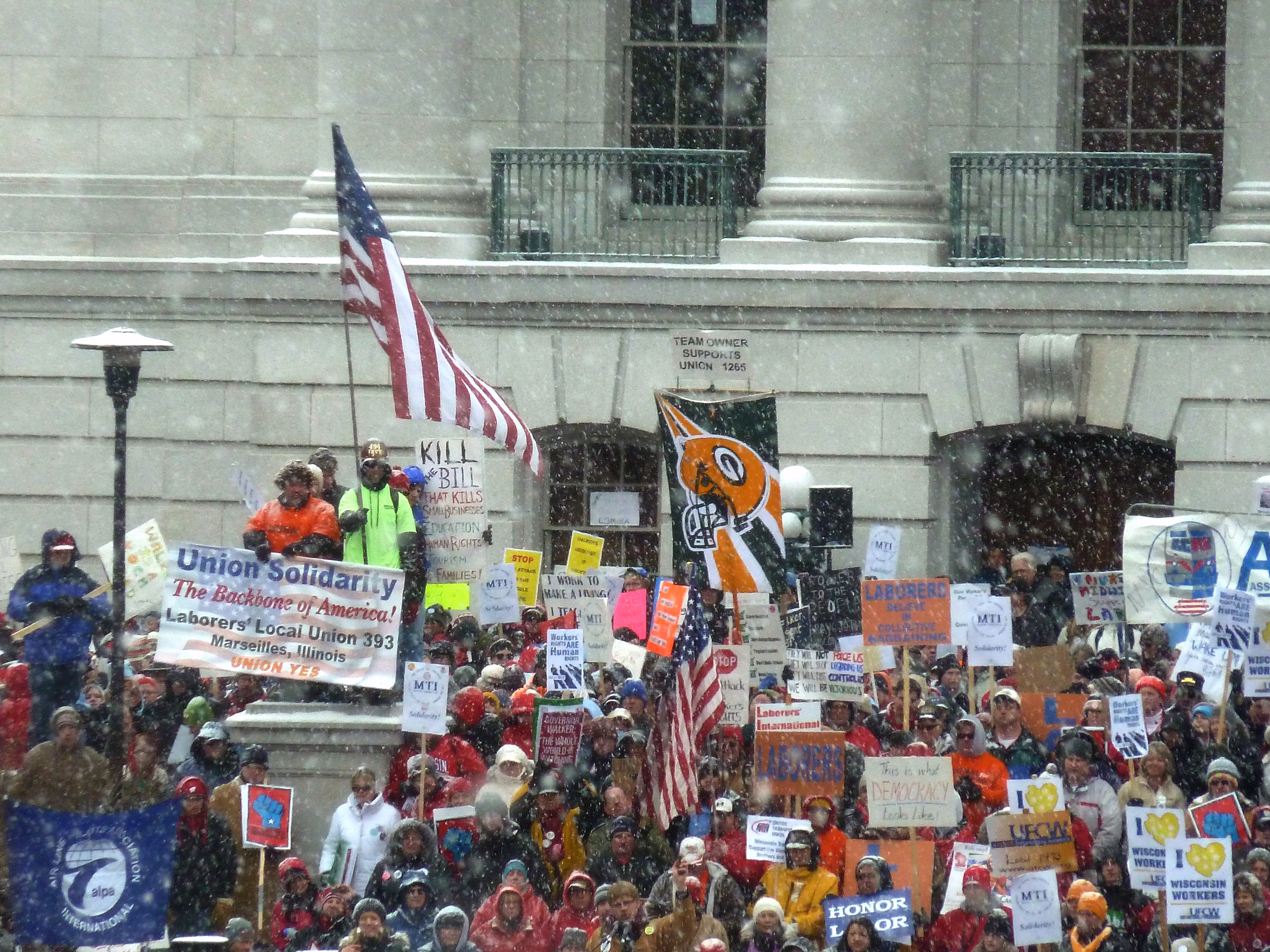
Demonstrators in steadily falling snow outside of the Wisconsin Capitol building.

=== Proposed Legislation and protests ===
Legislation proposed by Republican Governor of Wisconsin Scott Walker to address a projected $3.6 billion budget shortfall has sparked protests in Wisconsin. The legislation would require state employees to contribute 5.8% of their salaries to cover pension costs, contribute 12.6% towards their health care premiums, and would limit collective bargaining rights for most public employee union members. Democrats and union leaders offered to accept the increased cost of benefits but not the removal of bargaining rights. Walker offered a compromise to allow bargaining on wages with no limit which was deemed inadequate to the unions and the Democratic leadership.

A crowd estimated to be up to 100,000 people turned out in Madison, Wisconsin on Saturday, February 26 to protest Governor Walker's bill. Solidarity demonstrations, and demonstrations against similar measures in other states, also took place around the country.

Some journalists and political commentators have compared the protests to the Arab Spring, some in jest. Christian Science Monitor staff writer Stephen Kurczy dubbed the Wisconsin protests "The Cheddar Revolution". Many journalists and commentators also considered the Middle East and North African protests an inspiration for the U.S. public employee protests.

In all 50 US states of the United States, there have been rallies supporting the Wisconsin demonstrations.

==== Wisconsin Capitol building occupation ====
Protesters occupied the Wisconsin Capitol building to demonstrate their opposition to the proposed legislation restricting the collective bargaining rights of public employees and increase their share of benefits payments, and what they saw as anti-democratic behavior by the governor and legislature. On Friday, February 25, Capitol Police Chief Charles Tubbs told reporters that demonstrators would have to leave the Wisconsin state Capitol building by 4 pm on the following Sunday. According to media estimates, tens of thousands participated in the protests, and hundreds occupied the building around the clock. Police restricted sleeping bags, coolers, and folding chairs, and that the Capitol would be closed "for public health reasons". The Capitol was scheduled to reopen the following on Monday at 8 am, but police said they would closely monitor the number of people in the building. Some protesters vowed to remain as an act of civil disobedience, and non-violent civil disobedience training took place. Although many protesters did leave on Sunday afternoon at the urging of union leaders and Democrats, hundreds defied the order and remained in the building. Police did not remove the remaining protesters. The Department of Administration did not reopen the building until Tuesday nor remove the added security, such as metal detectors, for several weeks, in defiance of a court order.

On Thursday, March 3, Dane County Circuit Court Judge John Albert ordered that the Capitol building be cleared of protesters at building's the 6 pm closing time, but also ruled that restricting access to the building during business hours was unconstitutional because it violated the public's free speech and peaceful assembly rights.

==== Death threats ====
Eighteen Republican state Senators received death threats after passing the bill.

On May 12, 2011, 100 pages of public records were released that detailed the emotions and threats that occurred during the protests. Dozens of emails suggest Walker or legislators should be shot, or hanged, or should watch their backs, look over their shoulders or resign. One man tweeted that he prayed an anvil would fall from the sky onto Walker. FBI agents from Maine to California to Florida also got involved, the records show. A suspect in Maine was arrested after sending letters to that state's Republican U.S. senators suggesting Walker should be killed and that all Republican governors resign. A Burbank, California resident who sent a long email offering a $50,000 bounty for Walker was interviewed by federal agents who determined he was mentally challenged and not a true threat. Police in Nebraska tracked down a man who posted to a Wisconsin man's Facebook page that he expected the shooting to start soon and that he would be ready to inflict nonlethal shots so others could hear screams. He told officers he got "carried away," didn't intend to harm anyone and has never been to Wisconsin. A Stevens Point man called the State Police after he heard his accountant, who he knew is married to a teacher, remark that if Walker didn't stop attacking teachers unions he'd be assassinated. An agent interviewed the accountant and determined there was no threat.

==== Legislative walkout ====
In another form of protest, and as a tactic to prevent passage of the bill, all 14 Democratic members of the Wisconsin State Senate left the state of Wisconsin and traveled to Illinois in order to delay a vote on the bill. With only 19 Republican members, the Senate would not have the 20 Senators required for a quorum in order to vote on the bill, since it is a fiscal bill.

==== Recall elections ====
Groups began collecting signatures to try to recall eight Republicans and eight Democratic Senators. Of these attempts, six Republicans and three Democrats faced recall elections. Scholars could cite only three times in American history when more than one state legislator has been recalled at roughly the same time over the same issue. Two Republican senators lost their seats in the recall elections.

==== State Supreme Court election ====
The Wisconsin Supreme Court race between 12-year incumbent David Prosser Jr. and challenger Assistant Attorney General JoAnne Kloppenburg was widely seen as a referendum on Governor Walker's proposed budget reforms in Wisconsin and received considerable national media coverage. Prosser was seen as the pro-Walker candidate and Kloppenburg was seen as the anti-Walker candidate. On April 15, Prosser was named the official winner by 7,316 votes after all county canvassing was completed. On April 20, Kloppenburg asked for a recount. On May 20, Prosser was declared the official winner.

== See also ==
- United States Protests
  - Occupy Ashland
  - Occupy Atlanta
  - Occupy Austin
  - Occupy Boston
  - Occupy Buffalo
  - Occupy Chicago
  - Occupy Portland
  - Occupy San Jose
  - Occupy Seattle
  - Other U.S. protest locations
- 2011 Wisconsin protests
