= Bank Transfer Day =

2011 American consumer activism initiative

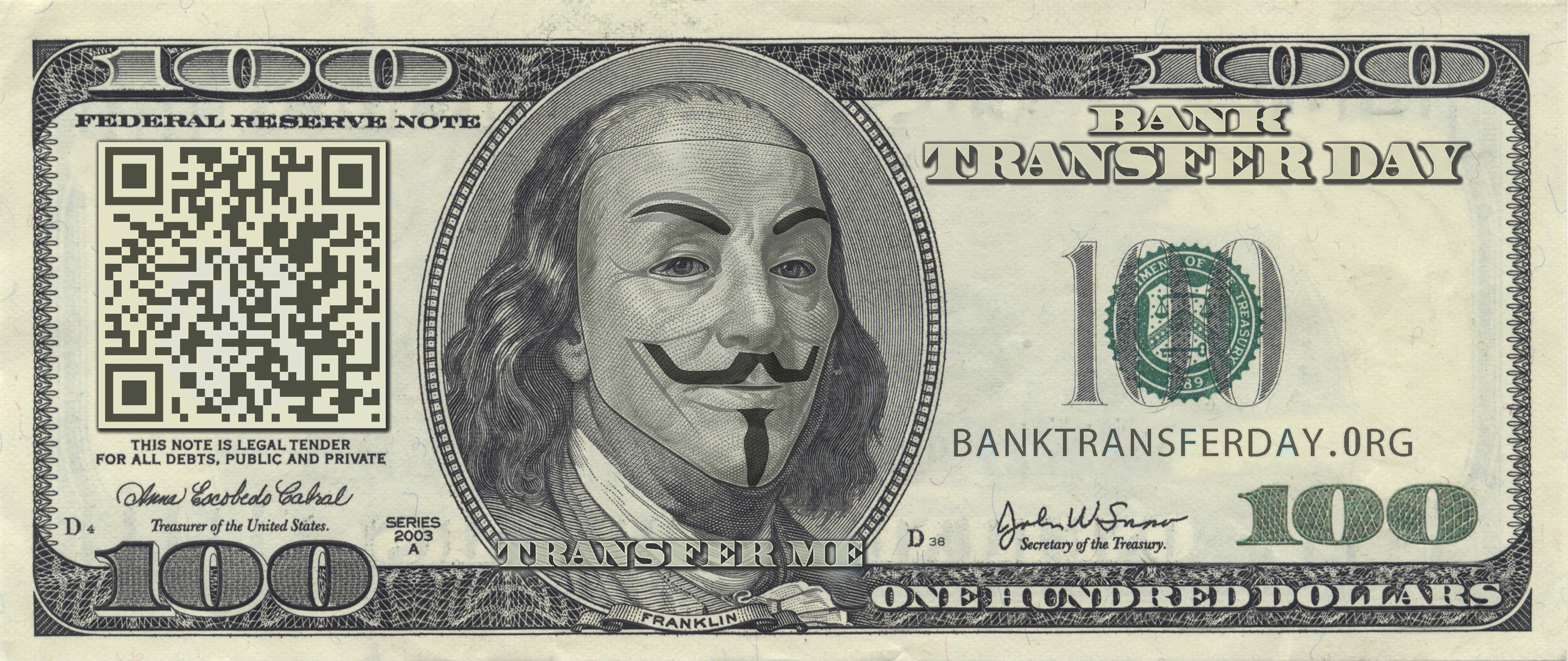
$100 Bank Transfer Day poster

Bank Transfer Day was a consumer activism initiative calling for a voluntary switch from commercial banks to not-for-profit credit unions by November 5, 2011. As of October 15, 2011, a Facebook page devoted to the effort had drawn more than 54,900 likes. Debit card fees of $5 a month from the Bank of America are among steps leading to the Bank Transfer Day protest with a November 5 deadline. Occupy Wall Street participants support the effort even though the events are not related. Among the detractors were Occupy Los Angeles participants: Sigurd Olin Christian, creator of the Bank Transfer Day event, stated that "he was accosted by Occupy Los Angeles organizers and has even received threatening phone calls" because of his pro-credit union rather than anti-bank approach.

Christian, an art gallery owner in Los Angeles, California, said he was dissatisfied with Bank of America's "ridiculous fees and poor customer service." He created an event on Facebook called “Bank Transfer Day” and invited his friends to close their accounts at big for-profit banks and move their money to credit unions by November 5, 2011. Christian chose November 5 because of its association with Guy Fawkes, who tried to blow up the British House of Lords and bring Catholic rule back to the United Kingdom, but was captured on that date in 1605. This has been a continuing observance.

== Overview ==
Bank Transfer Day encourages bank customers to transfer their cash out of big banks to credit unions. The event is in response to what critics regard as excessive fees that big banks plan to roll out, notably Bank of America's decision to charge its debit card users with a $5 monthly fee and Wells Fargo's $3 charge of the same. The Facebook page for the event states the following: "Together we can ensure that these banking institutions will always remember the 5th of November!! If the 99% removes our funds from the major banking institutions to non-profit credit unions on or by this date, we will send a clear message to the 1% that conscious consumers won't support companies with unethical business practices."

Similar sentiments predate the Bank Transfer Day by at least several years. In 2009, finance writer and radio host Dave Ramsey wrote: "I haven’t done business with big banks for years, primarily because of the awful customer service you get at most of them. I like local, community banks, and I believe whole-heartedly in credit unions. As a rule, these institutions practice excellent customer service. Plus, most of them didn’t get mixed up the sub-prime debacle." Similarly, Suze Orman was quoted in 2009 characterizing large banks as often doing "anything to increase earnings and profits" for shareholders, while credit unions, accountable to their members, are more typically "ethical and honest". In August 2011, Clark Howard advised his readers to be wary of "giant, monster megabanks" and to seek better interest rates and customer service at smaller banks or credit unions.

== Credit unions realize increased deposits ==
The Credit Union National Association (CUNA) said the association's web site aimed at informing customers about credit union services has seen traffic double. CUNA members reported an increase in account openings. According to Bill Cheney, CUNA's president and chief executive officer, the current surge in account openings has been more sustained than similar surges in the past.

Between September 29, the day that Bank of America announced its (now defunct) monthly fee for debit card transactions, and November 2, credit unions received $4.5 billion in funds and 440,000 new customers, which equated to a 50% increase in new accounts. CUNA claimed that on November 5, 2011 alone, approximately 40,000 people joined credit unions, with credit unions realizing $80 million in new account funds. In a December newsletter, CUNA estimated that nearly 700,000 consumers had opened new accounts at credit unions between late September and the November 5 target date, although an article published in American Banker in early December cites CUNA as offering a revised estimate of 214,000 new customers in October.

Small banks and credit unions with assets valued at less than $10 billion can afford to offer extra rewards and avoid imposing additional fees, as they are exempt from the caps imposed by the Durbin Amendment.

== Background ==
The planned debit transaction fee increase is reportedly caused by the Durbin Amendment that went into effect on October 1, which is an addition to the Dodd–Frank Wall Street Reform and Consumer Protection Act, a U.S. federal statute The Durbin Amendment limits the fees that banks can charge merchants when a consumer swipes their debit card from 44 cents to 24 cents. According to experts, a customer making 25 debit card transactions a month would lead the bank to lose $5 it would have made before the Durbin Amendment. As a result, it has been suggested^{(by whom?)} that the larger banks, including Wells Fargo and SunTrust, are making up for lost revenue by charging for debit card use, the cost ranging anywhere from $3 to $5 per month, although no specific cause/effect relationship has been established.

Democratic lawmakers asked the U.S. Justice Department to investigate the large banks that recently started charging debit card fees. A group of four congressmen claimed that major banks like Chase and Wells Fargo may have violated antitrust laws. In a letter to U.S. Attorney General Eric Holder, dated October 13, 2011, U.S. Representative Peter Welch and four other Democrats asked Holder to investigate whether big banks violated antitrust laws before announcing the fees. The four Congressmen said the timing of the new fees from each bank is suspicious.

On October 12, 2011, U.S. Representatives Jason Chaffetz (R-UT) and Bill Owens (D-NY) introduced a bill that would repeal the Durbin Amendment. According to Chaffetz, repealing the Durbin Amendment would fix the disastrous consequences of this bill. However, U.S. Representative Spencer Bachus (R-AL), who chairs the House Banking Committee, has suggested that revisiting the Durbin Amendment was a low priority. It is unclear whether the bill will ever see a vote.

On November 1, 2011, Bank of America announced plans to cancel its $5 debit card fee in response to customer feedback.

== See also ==
- 15 October 2011 global protests
- ATM usage fees
- Bank run
