= 2011 in politics =

These are some of the notable events relating to politics in 2011.

== Events ==
=== January ===
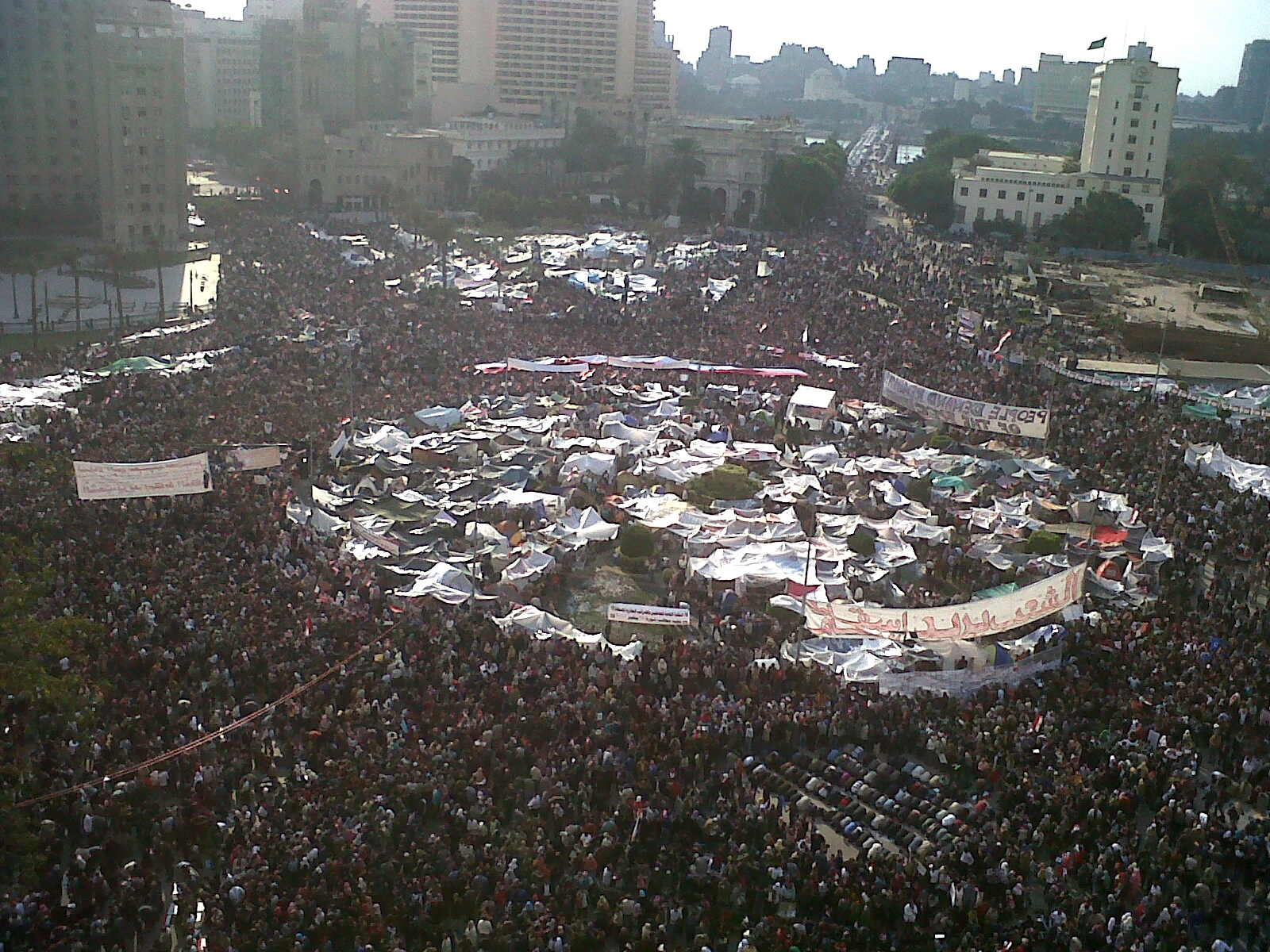
Tahrir Square, Egypt, 8 February 2011

- January 1 – Brazil inaugurates first female president, Dilma Rousseff
- January 6 – Investigation continues into BP oil spill off Gulf of Mexico
- January 8 – American congresswoman Gabby Giffords shot in Arizona
- January 14 – Amid the 2010–2011 Tunisian protests, long-time president Zine El Abidine Ben Ali dissolved the government, and flees the country due to opposition and military intervention, Tunisian PM steps in as interim president.
- January 16 – Former president Jean-Claude Duvalier returns to Haiti 25 years after being overthrown
- January 17 – Reports of self-immolation spread across Africa
- January 17 – Allegations of sexual misconduct committed by Italian Prime Minister Berlusconi grow
- January 18 – Obama hosts Chinese President Hu at private dinner
- January 20 – New Tunisian government lifts bans on previously outlawed political groups, frees political prisoners
- January 22 – Algerians defy ban on government protests, protest in capital
- January 23 – The Green Party of Ireland pulls out of Irish government, forcing early elections
- January 24 – Suicide bomb detonated at Domodedovo airport in Russia
- January 24 – Protests in Yemeni capital Sanaa, spurned on by changes in Tunisia
- January 27 – Egyptian opposition leader and Nobel peace laureate Mohamed ElBaradei return to Cairo amid political unrest
- January 29 – Protest in Egypt continue, spurned on by reports from Tunisia, protesters believe President will soon step down
- January 30 – In a preliminary vote, 99% of South Sudan votes to split from the North, brought about by the 2005 peace agreement which ended two decades of war
- January 30 – Protesters in London march against Egyptian President Mubarak
- January 31 – Egyptian army rules out the use of force against the thousands of protesters across the country

=== February ===
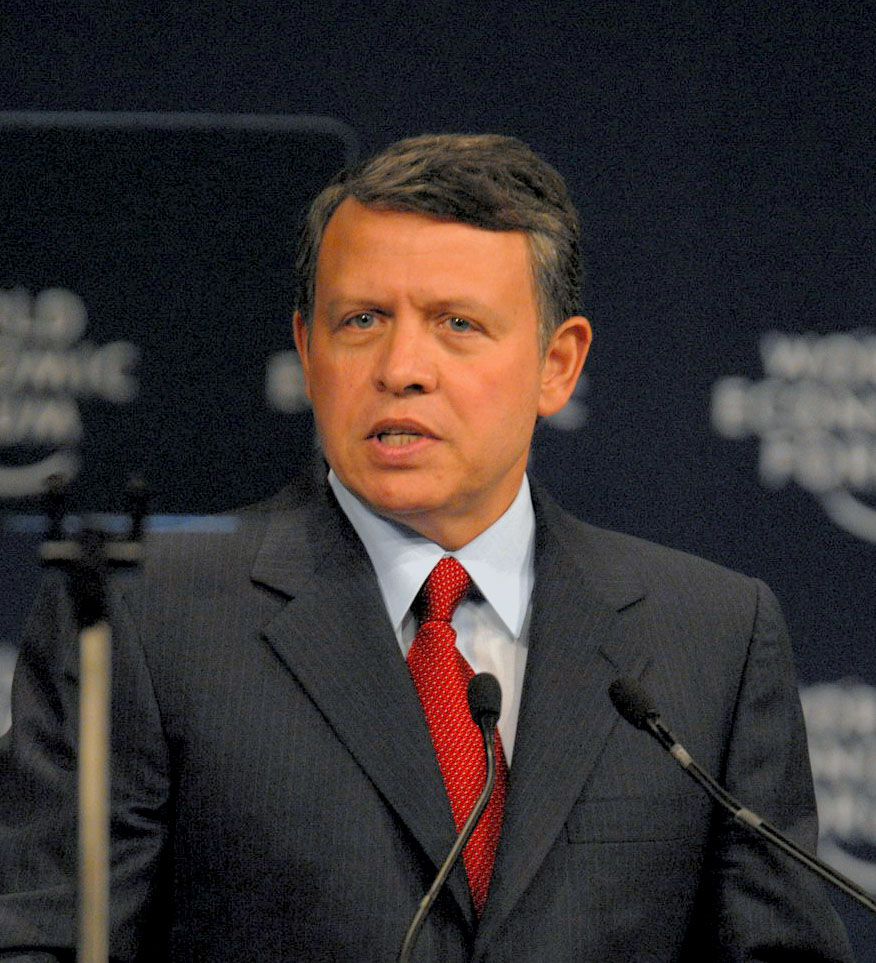
King Abdullah of Jordan

- February 1 – King Abdullah II, King of Jordan, dismisses the government of Jordan, appoints new PM with orders to implement political reform
- February 1 – Egyptian President Mubarak says he will not run again after his current term ends, protesters do not capitulate
- February 3 – Gunfire in central Cairo, as pro-Mubarak protesters clash with anti-Mubarak protesters
- February 4 – Crowds grow in Tahrir Square as protesters rally to celebrate day of departure
- February 7 – Egyptian government raises pay of public sector workers by 15% in attempt to quell protests
- February 8 – North Korea and South Korea initiate military talks after year long hiatus
- February 11 – Amid the 2011 Egyptian revolution, long-time president Hosni Mubarak resigns
- February 12 – Egypt's military leaders, currently in control of country, pledge to uphold all existing international treaties
- February 13 – Egypt's military, currently in control of country, dissolve parliament and suspend constitution, stating they will control the country for 6 months or until elections can be held
- February 13 – Italian women stage anti Berlusconi demonstrations, in wake of allegations of sexual misconduct
- February 14 – Large protests around Algerian capital, protesters call for democratic leadership
- February 16 – Protests erupt in Benghazi, Libya
- February 16 – Police and pro democracy protesters clash in Manama Bahrain
- February 20 – Clashes across the city of Benghazi leave 200 dead and 900 injured
- February 20 – Security forces shut down protests in Tehran
- February 22 – Libyan leader Muammar Gaddafi refuses to stand down amid wide spread protests
- February 25 – Barack Obama announces American sanctions against Gaddafi's Libya
- February 26 – UN Security Council unanimously approves sanctions against Libya
- February 27 – Unrest in Libya spark border crisis, as civilians attempting to flee violence cross into neighboring countries

=== March ===
- March 2 – Pakistani minority minister Shahbaz Bhatti killed in ambush in Islamabad

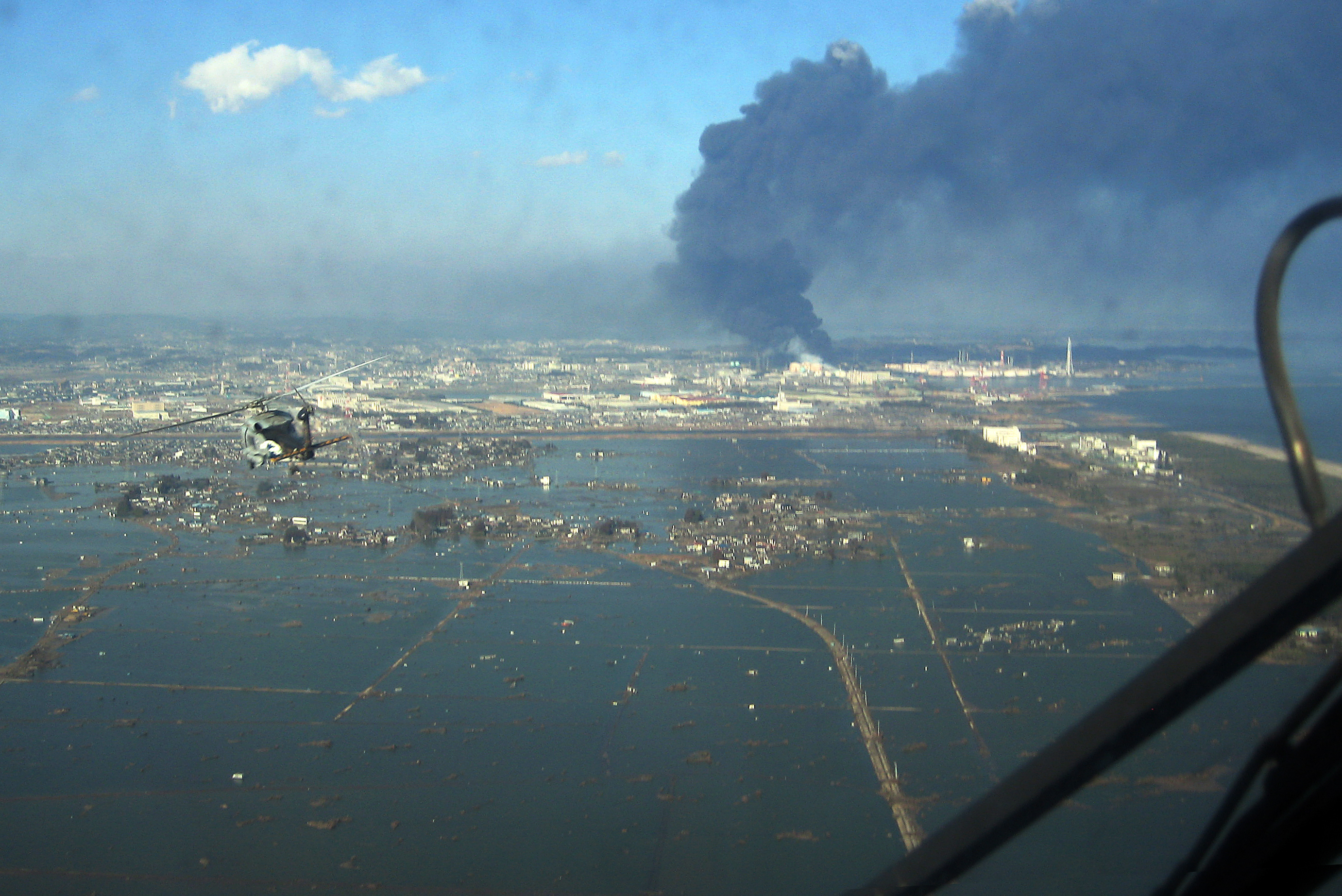
Helicopter flies over Sendai, Japan

- March 4 – Libyan security forces force protesters from Tripoli, Gaddafi's stronghold
- March 5 – Saudi Arabia imposes ban on protests
- March 9 – Wisconsin bans collective bargaining for state's public employees
- March 10 – Security forces in Saudi Arabia shoot at protesters
- March 13 – Earthquake and Tsunami in Japan cause massive damage, Japanese prime minister says it is the worst crisis since the Second World War
- March 17 – UN Security Council approve a no fly zone in Libya in an effort to protect civilians
- March 20 – Egyptian voters vote in favor of constitutional amendments that pave the way for elections in June
- March 23 – 15 protesters are killed in Syria when security forces clash with anti-government protesters
- March 30 – Libya's foreign minister defects while in Britain, claims attacks on civilians as reason for defection
- March 30 – Syrian president Bashar al-Assad does not lift state of emergency, in place for several decades

=== April ===
- April 3 – Protests spread in eastern Afghanistan in reaction to a Florida Priest burning the Quran

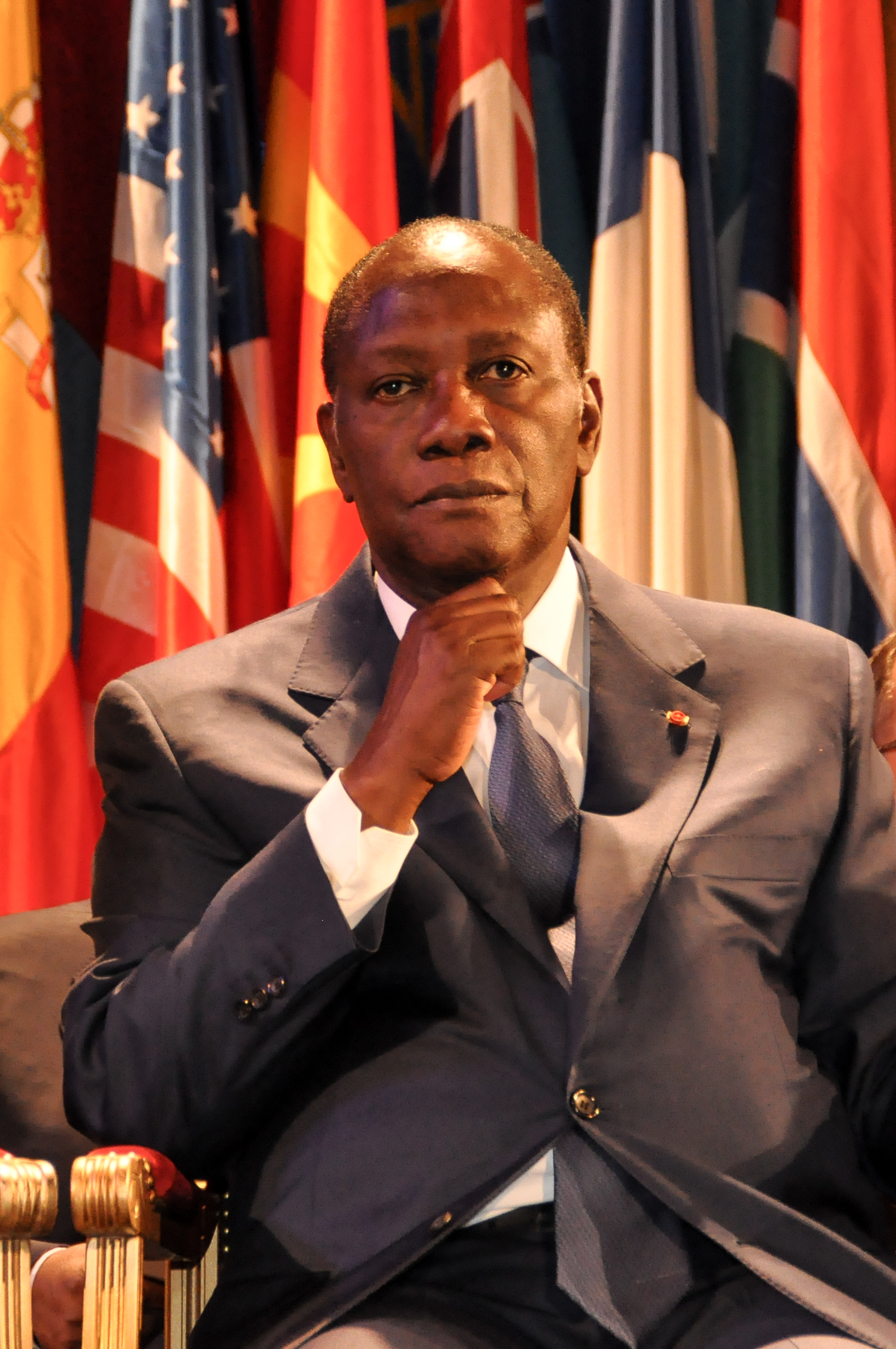
Alassane Ouattara, 5th President of the Ivory Coast

- April 6 – Portugal to seek bailout from EU, cite rising debt and inability to raise funds on international markets
- April 10 – France begins enforcing a ban on face veils, begins detaining those wearing face veils
- April 12 – Ex president of the Ivory Coast, Laurent Gbagbo is detained by UN recognized Ivory Coast government led by Alassane Ouattara, when Gbagbo refused to cede power after November elections
- April 13 – Egyptian prosecutors order the detention of Mubarak and his sons
- April 14 – American Congress votes to approve budget bill, financing the government through September
- April 20 – Syrian government passes law to lift decades old state of emergency, dissolve state security courts, and pass law to allow peaceful protests
- April 22 – Japanese government approves a disaster relief budget of 4 trillion Yen to begin the cleanup from March's tsunami
- April 23 – At least 75 people are killed in clashes between security forces and anti-regime protesters in Syria, planned funerals expected to draw large crowds
- April 23 – Yemeni President Ali Abdullah Saleh agrees to step down in exchange for immunity for him and his family, Saleh held power for 32 years
- April 24 – Pope Benedict XVI calls for peace in the Middle East and Africa, and mentions the plight of the Japanese people in Easter message
- April 27 – The Palestinian movements of Hamas and Fatah announced that they are ready to form a unity government, raising hopes for a more unified Palestine
- April 27 – President Obama releases his birth certificate
- April 29 – Prince William marries Catherine Middleton in royal wedding at Westminster Abbey
- April 30 – Syrian security forces surround and raid the Omari Mosque in Daraa
- April 30 – Gaddafi's youngest son and three grandchildren are killed in a Nato airstrike in Tripoli

=== May ===
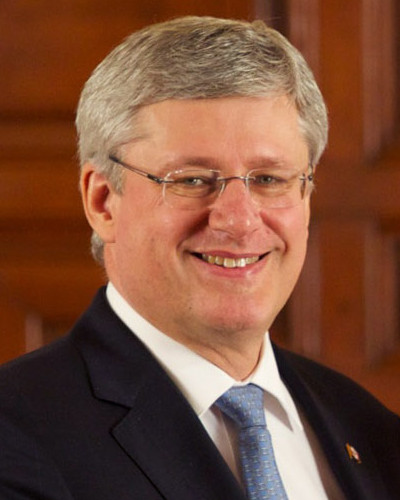
Stephen Harper, Prime Minister of Canada

- May 1 – Osama bin Laden was killed in his compound by a US Navy.
- May 1 – Pope John Paul II is beatified
- May 2 – Canadian prime minister Stephen Harper wins majority in election, New Democratic Party takes opposition
- May 7 – The Pentagon releases the home videos of Osama Bin Laden, seized during raid on Bin Laden's compound
- May 12 – American and Pakistan officials question the wives of Osama bin Laden who were captured during the raid
- May 13 – Pakistani officials condemn unilateral American raid and drone strikes inside Pakistan
- May 16 – The head of the International Monetary Fund Dominique Strauss-Kahn is charged with an alleged sexual assault on a hotel maid
- May 16 – Israeli security forces and Pro-Palestinian protesters clash along Israel border, during Nakba Day protests
- May 17 – Queen Elizabeth II of the United Kingdom honors Irish people killed while fighting for independence from Britain
- May 19 – President Obama gives speech outlining America's policy toward the Middle East, specifically addressing the recent uprisings and protests occurring in the Arab world
- May 20 – President Obama and Israeli prime minister Netanyahu admit they do not share the same ideals on the path to Middle Eastern Peace
- May 24 – President Obama praises the United Kingdom's special ties with the United States, specifically citing their continued support post 9/11, and continued military support
- May 27 – Leaders meeting at the G8 summit in France say that Gaddafi must step down, British PM Cameron and French President Sarkozy plan visit to Libya
- May 29 – FIFA suspends 2 top executives amid bribery allegations, clears top executive Blatter
- May 30 – South African president Jacob Zuma visits Libya on a peace mission, seeking a diplomatic solution to the ongoing Libyan protests

=== June ===
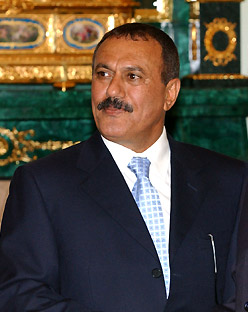
Ali Abdullah Saleh, 1st President of Yemen

- June 3 – Syrian security forces open fire on protester killing 34, government cuts Internet access in attempt to quell protests
- June 4 – Long time Yemen President Ali Abdullah Saleh heads to Saudi Arabia for medical treatment for injuries sustained during a rocket attack, the president's absence from the country prompted protests and rumors of his stepping down
- June 5 – Ollanta Humala is elected President of Peru
- June 13 – Several doctors and nurses from Bahrain go on trial for allegedly taking control of a hospital, storing weapons, and holding prisoners during anti-government protests
- June 18 – The Obama administration announced that they would begin peace talks with the Taliban, plan to eventually hand talks over to Afghan president Hamid Karzai and his peace council
- June 19 – The European Union announced that Greece would receive more loans to prevent the country from defaulting on previous loans
- June 21 – A Tunisian court has sentenced former President Ben Ali and his wife to jail in absentia for 35 years, for embezzlement and missing public funds

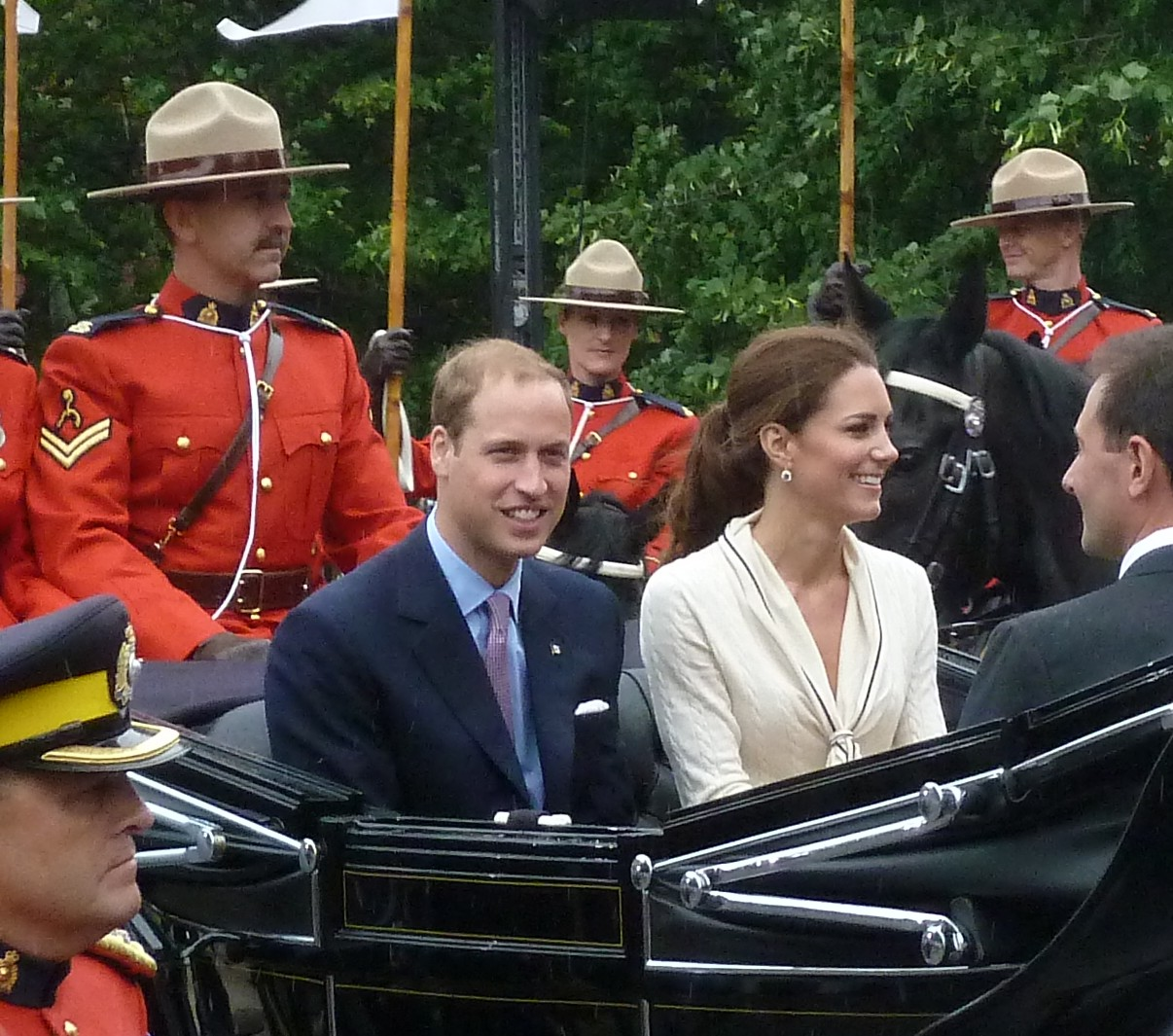
Prince William and Princess Kate in Prince Edward Island Canada

- June 22 – President Obama announced his plans to withdraw 10,000 troops from Afghanistan by the end of the year, and a total of 33,000 by the middle of 2012
- June 25 – Chinese activist Hu Jia was released from prison after serving three and a half years on subversion charges
- June 27 – The International Criminal Court at the Hague issues a warrant for Libyan leader Gaddafi, his son, and his spy chief
- June 28 – In a planned 2 day general strike demonstrators in Greece gather to protest the austerity measures proposed by the government and the EU
- June 29 – The government of Greece votes to accept proposed austerity measures
- June 30 – Prince William and Princess Kate arrive in Canada for a royal tour to coincide with Canada Day

=== July ===
- July 4 – Thailand elects first female prime minister Yingluck Shinawatra, after her party Pheu Thai won a seat majority
- July 5 – Venezuelan President Hugo Chavez addresses crowd after return from Cuba for emergency cancer surgery
- July 7 – British newspaper News of the World shuts down amid accusations that it eavesdropped on numerous high-profile people
- July 8 – Space Shuttle Atlantis lifts off for final time
- July 9 – South Sudan becomes independent country, raises new flag, Salva Kiir becomes first president
- July 13 – United Kingdom lawmakers summon Rupert Murdoch, his son, and News of the World editor Rebekah Brooks to testify over phone hacking scandal
- July 13 – Eurozone summit reaches deal regarding Greek debt crisis, bailout package secured
- July 16 – The United States officially recognizes the Transitional National Council, as the legitimate government in Libya
- July 18 – London Police chief resigns amid News of the World phone hacking scandal
- July 20 – UK Parliament questions Prime Minister Cameron over News of the World phone hacking scandal, and his former communications director Andy Coulson
- July 21 – Space Shuttle Atlantis makes final landing, marks end of 30 years of shuttle flights
- July 22 – The 2011 Norway attacks were two sequential domestic terrorist attacks by Anders Behring Breivik against the government, the civilian population, and a Workers' Youth League (AUF) summer camp, in which 77 people were killed.
- July 29 – Republicans block proposed budget plan, causing roadblock in debt-ceiling crisis
- July 31 – Syrian security forces clash with protesters in Hama, at least 71 killed

=== August ===
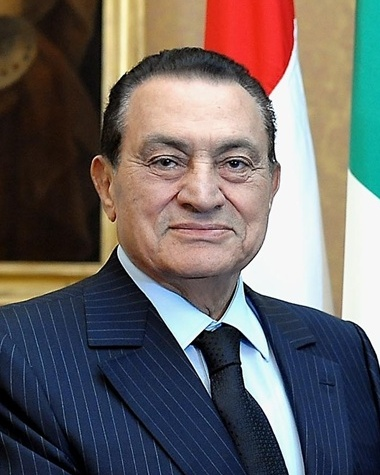
Hosni Mubarak

- August 2 – President Obama signs U.S. debt bill, ending default threat
- August 3 – Former Egyptian president Hosni Mubarak pleads not guilty as trial begins, was brought to courtroom in a cage
- August 6 – S&P downgrades United States Government credit rating from AAA to AA+
- August 7 – Protesters in London riot in response to fatal police shooting
- August 10 – Protests in London subside after four nights of riots, Prime Minister Cameron vows 'fightback', increases number of police in city streets
- August 11 – Debate held for Republican nomination for the president
- August 16 – France and Germany call for closer economic and fiscal policy in the eurozone
- August 17 – Anti-corruption protester Anna Hazare on huger strike in prison, Prime Minister Manmohan Singh says strike is misconceived
- August 18 – President Obama and European leaders call for the resignation of Syrian leader Bashar al-Assad, new American sanctions against Syrian government
- August 21 – American hikers detained in Iran for two years sentenced to 8 years in prison, 5 years for cooperating with American Intelligence Services and 3 years for illegal entry
- August 24 – Kim Jong-il initiated rare talks with Russian prime minister Dmitry Medvedev, speaks about possibility of denuclearisation and economic cooperation
- August 29 – Libyan leader Muammar Gaddafi flees to Algeria with his wife and three children
- August 29 – Toomas Hendrik Ilves is re-elected President of Estonia.
- August 30 – Japan's governing party, the Democratic Party of Japan, votes Yoshihiko Noda as leader
- August 31 – Libyan Rebels issue ultimatum to troops still loyal to Muammar Qaddafi, rebels say loyalists must surrender or face an attack

=== September ===
- September 2 – Turkey expels Israeli diplomats in protest over Israeli raid on Gaza-bound ship, in which 9 Turkish nationals died
- September 6 – A convoy of armed Gaddafi loyalists flee from Libya across the Northern border into Niger
- September 10 – Protesters in Egypt force their way into the Israeli embassy in Cairo, following several days of protest outside the embassy
- September 11 – Ceremonies held across America remembering the victims of the 9/11 attacks a decade after the event
- September 13 – American embassy and NATO headquarters in Kabul attacked by suicide bombers
- September 15 – British prime minister David Cameron and French president Nicolas Sarkozy pledge aid for Libya's new provisional leaders
- September 17 – Occupy Wall Street begins in Zuccotti Park
- September 21 – Hikers detained in Iran are freed
- September 23 – Yemeni President Ali Abdullah Saleh returns from emergency medical treatment in Saudi Arabia
- September 24 – Palestine leader Mahmoud Abbas submits request to the United Nations to be recognized as a state
- September 24 – Vladimir Putin is set to return as Russia's president in 2012, Dmitry Medvedev the current president, will switch positions with Putin to become the prime minister
- September 25 – Women in Saudi Arabia gain the right to vote and to stand for election
- September 29 – Eurozone bailout fund is granted expanded powers in an attempt to stabilize the Euro

=== October ===
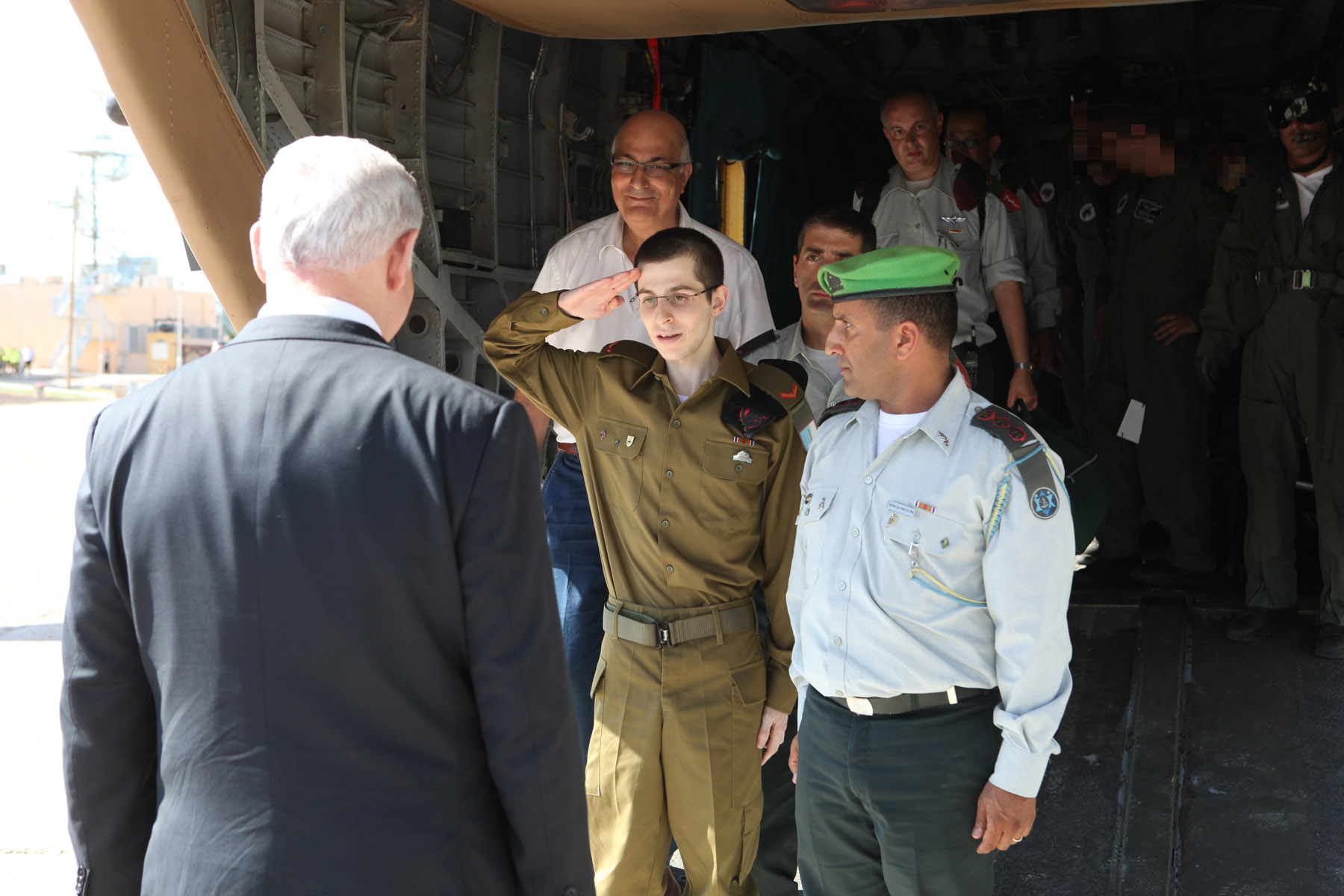
Gilad Shalit Salutes Israel Prime Minister Benjamin Netanyahu

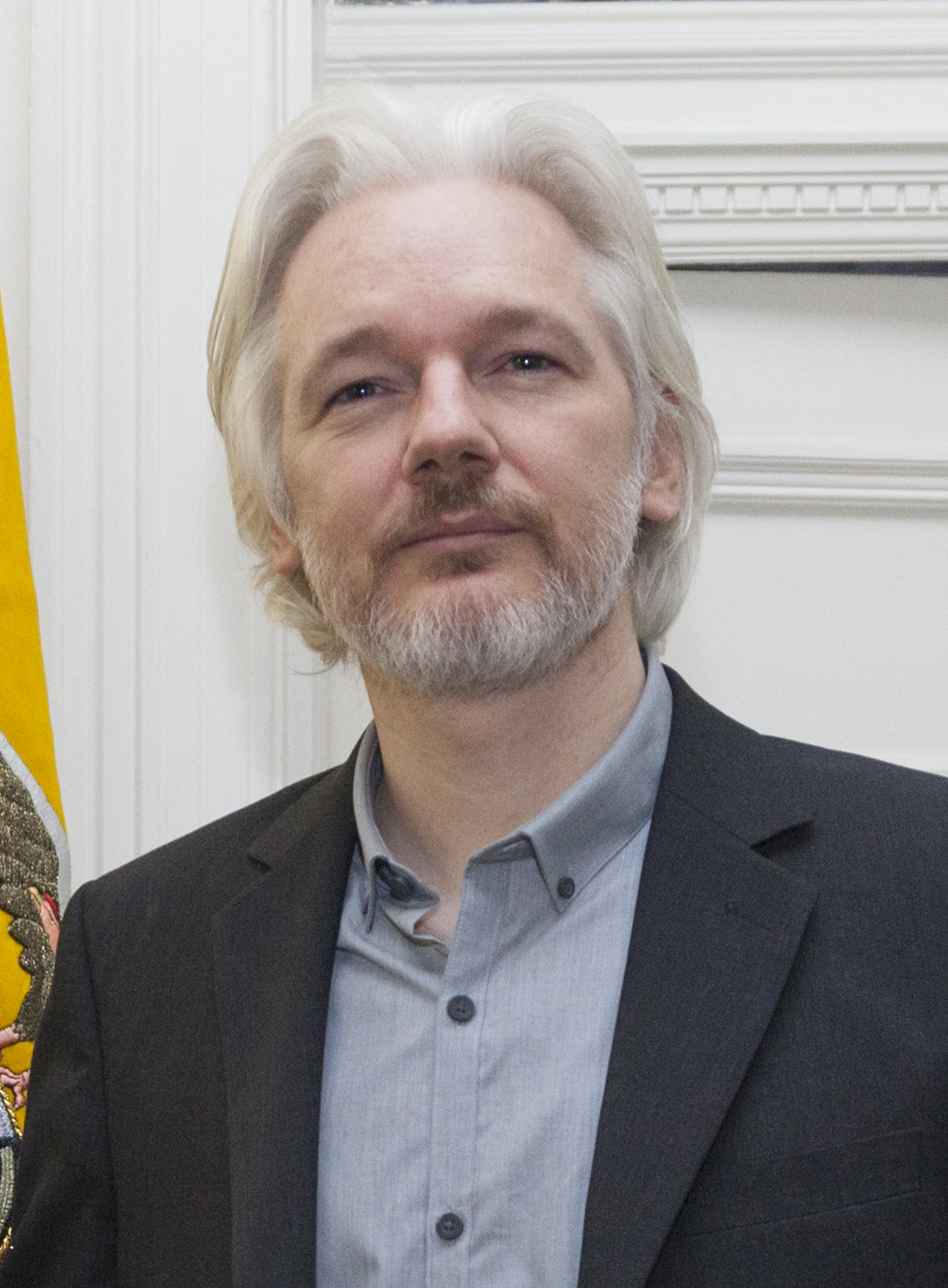
Julian Assange

- October 2 – Greece is set to default on a bailout package despite austerity measures, the bailout package is less than a year old
- October 8 – Yemen's president Ali Abdullah Saleh promises to cede power, a promise he has made 3 times in 2011
- October 8 – Security council vetoes 2 resolutions on Syria, the drafts would have stopped aerial bombardment, the other would have urged a halt to hostilities
- October 9 – 23 people die amid clashes between Egyptian Security Forces and protesters
- October 9 – Germany's Merkel and France's Sarkozy agree to important changes to the way the Eurozone operates, in an attempt to end Euro crisis
- October 11 – Israel and Hamas agree to a prisoner swap, 1000 Palestinian prisoners for Israeli soldier Gilad Shalit
- October 15 – At least 70 people are injured in Rome, as protesters clash with police, amid protests inspired by Occupy Wall Street
- October 15 – Protesters from Occupy Wall Street move to fill Time's Square
- October 17 – Francois Hollande wins primary race of the French Socialist Party
- October 22 – Heir to Saudi throne Abdul Aziz Al Saud dies at 85
- October 23 – Libya's interim leaders declare liberation from the Gaddafi regime
- October 24 – U.S. pull ambassador Robert Ford from Syria citing safety concerns
- October 28 – Heads of government of the 16 Commonwealth realms unanimously supported the changes to the royal succession
- October 31 – Global population reaches 7 Billion
- October 31 – UNESCO accept Palestine's bid for full membership

=== November ===
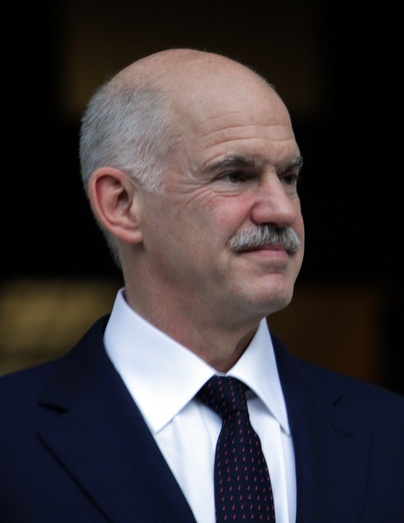
George Papandreou, Prime Minister of Greece

- November 2 – WikiLeaks founder Julian Assange loses court battle to remain in the United Kingdom, will be extradited to Sweden
- November 2 – Protesters from the Occupy Oakland movement shut down the Oakland Port
- November 3 – Greek prime minister George Papandreou scraps a referendum on Greece's bailout
- November 10 – Papademos named as new prime minister of Greece
- November 11 – The Italian Senate adopts an austerity law to avoid a bailout
- November 11 – Mexico's Interior Minister Francisco Blake Mora dies in helicopter crash
- November 12 – Silvio Berlusconi resigns as Italian prime-minister
- November 12 – The Arab League suspends Syria from meetings and adopts sanctions against Damascus, amid failure to end government crackdown on protesters
- November 14 – Mario Monti is named to replace outgoing prime minister Silvio Berlusconi
- November 15 – Colombia's FARC name Timoleon Jimenez as new leader
- November 18 – Hundreds of people are arrested as Occupy Wall Street protesters march across the Brooklyn Bridge
- November 18 – The UN's nuclear watchdog voices deep concern over the nuclear program of Iran
- November 20 – The People's Party of Spain win election in a landslide
- November 24 – Egyptian military appoint new prime minister Kamal Ganzouri
- November 28 – First day of Egyptian elections since the military seized power
- November 29 – Protesters in Iran storm the British embassy in Tehran
- November 30 – The UK expels all Iranian diplomats from country, citing embassy attack as cause

=== December ===
- December 1 – U.S. Secretary of State Hillary Clinton meets former political prisoner Aung San Suu Kyi in Burma
- December 3 – Herman Cain suspends his run for the office of President of the United States
- December 5 – Sarkozy and Merkel outline new Eurozone fiscal pact aimed at avoiding another debt crisis
- December 9 – Joseph Kabila is re-elected as the president of the DR Congo
- December 10 – Citizens of Russia gather to protest against alleged election fraud, the biggest protest in over 20 years
- December 12 – Canada pulls out of the Kyoto accord
- December 13 – The UN estimates at least 5000 people have been killed in crackdowns on anti-regime activists in Syria
- December 15 – Former mayor of Paris, and president of France Jacques Chirac is found guilty on corruption charges
- December 16 – At least 10 people die in clashes between striking oil workers and government forces in Kazakhstan
- December 18 – Czech leader and playwright Václav Havel dies at 75
- December 18 – North Korean leader Kim Jong-Il dies at 69
- December 19 – Warrant issued by President of Iraq, for the arrest of Vice President on terrorism charges
- December 23 – US Congress passes payroll tax cut extension
- December 26 – Arab League sends observers to Syria, to monitor ongoing crisis
- December 28 – State funeral held for Kim Jong-il in North Korea
- December 29 – Son of Kim Jong-Il, Kim Jong-Un hailed as supreme leader of North Korea
