= Campbell v. City of Oakland =

Ongoing civil rights lawsuit in Northern California District Court

- Court: United States District Court for the Northern District of California
- Full case name: Timothy Scott Campbell, et al. v. City of Oakland, et al.

Court membership
- Judge sitting: Richard Seeborg

Timothy Scott Campbell, et al. v. City of Oakland, et al. is an ongoing civil rights lawsuit in the US District Court of Northern California.

External videos
- "Shot by police with rubber bullet at Occupy Oakland" Filmed by Scott Campbell, moments before being shot by an Oakland Police officer.

Scott Campbell was video recording members of the Oakland Police Department during an Occupy Oakland protest on the night of November 2–3, 2011. Shortly before 1am on November 3, he was shot by police using a less-lethal round while he was filming a stationary line of police in riot gear, hours after the 2011 Oakland general strike but during ongoing street clashes between protestors and police in what the San Francisco Chronicle described as "chaos after midnight. Masked vandals shattered windows, set fires and plastered downtown businesses with graffiti before police moved in, dispersing crowds with tear gas and flash-bang grenades and making dozens of arrests."

The apparently unprovoked shooting of Campbell was documented by the resulting point-of-view video from his own camera. University of South Carolina criminal justice professor Geoffrey Alpert said that unless something occurred off-camera to provoke the officer, the shooting was "one of the most outrageous uses of a firearm" he'd ever seen. "Unless there's a threat that you can't see in the video, that just looks like absolute punishment, which is the worst type of excessive force," Alpert told the Oakland Tribune.

Campbell and co-plaintiffs filed suit in Federal Court in November 2011. In 2013, the City of Oakland approved a $1.17 million settlement to Scott Campbell and 11 other Occupy Oakland protestors who were injured by police.
