= Occupy Oakland =

Protest group against economic inequality

- Part of the Occupy movement
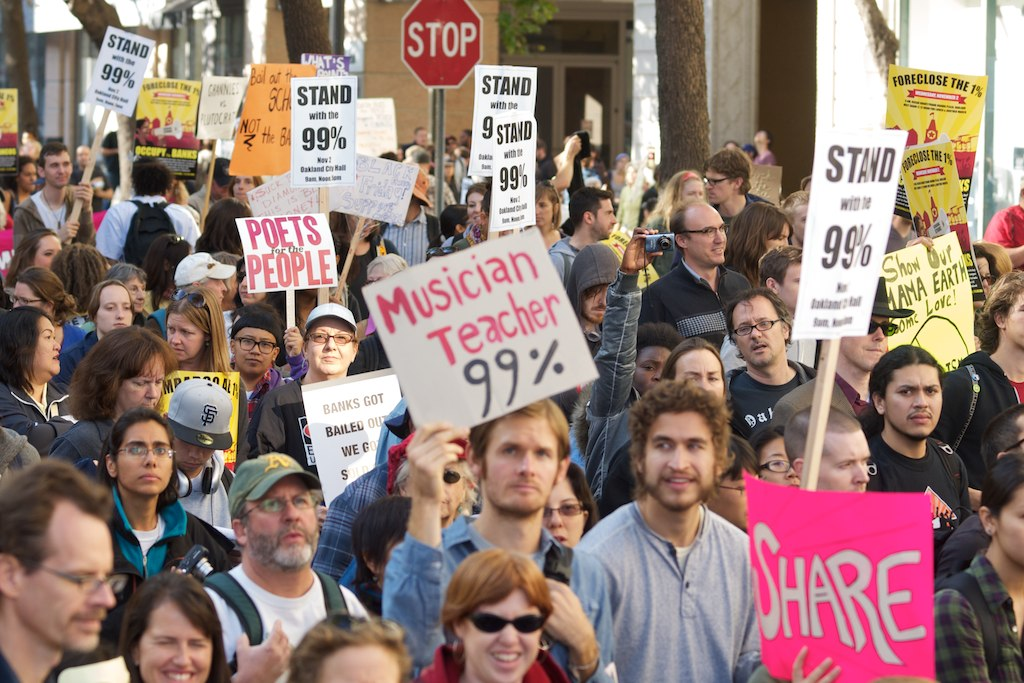
- Occupy Oakland on November 2, 2011
- Date: October 10, 2011
- Location: Oakland, California; 37°48′18″N 122°16′18.48″W
- Caused by: Wealth inequality; Perceived Corporatocracy; Allegations of police misconduct
- Methods: Occupation; Picketing; General Strike; Rioting

Parties
Protesters	(Oakland, California) Oakland City Government; Oakland Police Department

Lead figures
Occupyoakland.org; Occupy Oakland General Assembly	Mayor Jean Quan; Police Chief Howard Jordan; City Administrator Deanna Santana

Arrests and injuries
- Injuries: 4+
- Arrested: 400+

Occupy Oakland refers to a collaboration and series of demonstrations in Oakland, California, that started in October 2011. As part of the Occupy movement, protesters have staged occupations, most notably at Frank H. Ogawa Plaza in front of Oakland City Hall.

Occupy Oakland began as a protest encampment at Frank H. Ogawa Plaza on October 10, 2011. Protesters renamed it Oscar Grant Plaza after a young man who was fatally shot by Bay Area Rapid Transit Police in 2009. The encampment was cleared out by multiple law enforcement agencies on October 25, 2011. The movement also helped spur the November 2, 2011, Oakland General Strike that shut down the Port of Oakland. Police again cleared the protest encampment at Frank Ogawa Plaza on November 14, 2011. Other protest encampments were created and subsequently dismantled by law enforcement. The last encampment at Snow Park was cleared on November 21, 2011. Occupy Oakland then had no physical presence in any public space overnight in the city.

Occupy Oakland has often centered on complaints about alleged police misconduct, and relationships between protesters and police were especially frayed at Occupy Oakland. Oakland police estimated that as of April 2012 they had interacted with over 60,000 protesters since the movement began. As of December 2014, Occupy Oakland continued to engage in organized events and actions on a much smaller scale than the earlier demonstrations.

== Occupations and major events ==
=== First plaza occupation ===
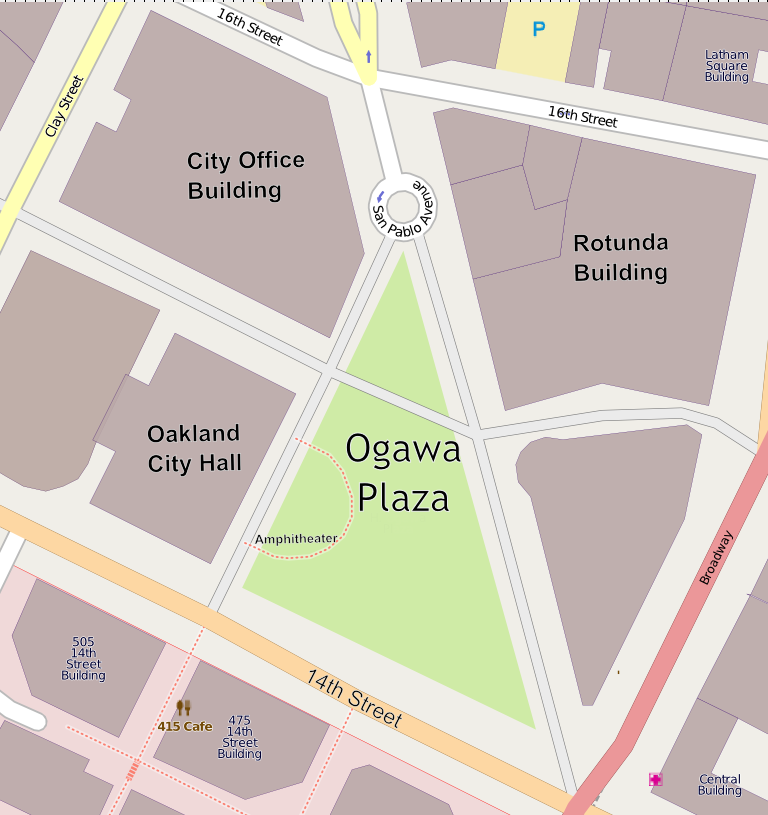
An overhead layout of Frank H. Ogawa plaza.

Occupy Oakland poster announcing the October 22 March.

The first occupation lasted for 15 days from October 10 to October 25. Frank H. Ogawa Plaza, was symbolically renamed "Oscar Grant Plaza" by the protesters, referring to Oscar Grant, an Oakland man shot and killed by BART police officer Johannes Mehserle in 2009.

The occupation of Frank Ogawa Plaza officially began at 4 p.m. on October 10, 2011, with a rally attended by hundreds of supporters that was also held in tandem with a rally for Indigenous People's Day. The first general assembly, based on Occupy Wall Street's New York general assembly, was held in the plaza amphitheater at 6 p.m. and several dozen protesters set up tents that evening.

Occupy Oakland planned and organized a number of direct actions including marches and rallies and guest speakers to build support for the movement. On October 14, protesters participated in a short march during rush hour traffic. The following weekend, around 2,500 people, including actor and activist Danny Glover, came out for a Saturday march and rally to show their support for Occupy Oakland. On October 17, the three American hikers recently freed from an Iranian prison made their first West Coast speaking appearance at Occupy Oakland, drawing an audience of around 300 people.

The camp grew to roughly 150 tents that were used for both camping and to provide services to protesters and visitors. A "miniature city" evolved with a kitchen, library, a bicycle-powered media center, and children's village. The grass was strewn with straw and walkways were created using wooden pallets and boards. There were tents dedicated to arts and crafts, medical attention, supplies, and conflict resolution. Activities were scheduled throughout the day including committee meetings, discussion groups, and yoga classes. Actor and activist Danny Glover spoke at a rally on October 15. Hip hop artist Lupe Fiasco donated food, supplies, and tents to the protesters the night he played a concert in town. The grandnephew of labor leader and civil rights activist César Chávez, Mateus Chávez and his fiancé Latrina Rhinehart, got married at the site on October 20, 2011, to show their support.

On October 22, protesters held a rally at the plaza, marched from the plaza to Snow Park and protested outside a branch of Wells Fargo.

==== October 25 police raid and evening protest ====
At 4:50 a.m. on October 25, 2011, police in riot gear arrived to clear the plaza encampment. The raid was conducted by 392 officers of the Oakland Police Department along with 202 personnel from 15 local law-enforcement agencies under a mutual aid agreement. Officers were from the police departments of Berkeley, UC Berkeley, Emeryville, Fremont, Hayward, Newark, Palo Alto, Pleasanton, San Francisco, San Jose, and Santa Clara, as well as the Alameda County Sheriff's Office, San Francisco Sheriff's Department, Santa Clara County Sheriff's Office, and Solano County Sheriff's Department. Additionally, the California Highway Patrol assisted in traffic management and security of the freeways, but was not involved with clearing the camp.

About 200 protesters attempted to stop the police from clearing the camp with a makeshift barricade consisting of crates, metal police barricades and dumpsters. Police stated that loud bangs that were heard when the raid began came from M-80 and M-1000 firecrackers hurled at officers by protesters. Police said that they used tear gas in order to effect an arrest after officers who were pelted with rocks and bottles, and that police used a beanbag non-lethal rounds after a protester threw a garbage can at officers. During the raid police arrested a total of 75 people, mostly for misdemeanors. Police erected metal barricades around the perimeter of the encampment, as 200-300 protesters gathered around them chanting.

External videos
- "Raw Video: Protesters Clash With Oakland Police." Footage of woman's arrest at police line. Police firing tear gas at protesters. Oct. 25
- "Occupy Oakland: teargas fired at protesters." Compilation of Oct. 25 clashes. Includes aerial footage of tear gas & flashbangs.

At 4 p.m. between 1000 and 1500 protesters gathered at the downtown Oakland Public Library for a rally and march back to the plaza to try and re-occupy the plaza. On their way, they headed to the Oakland Police Department Headquarters to protest, and were blocked by a line of police in riot gear. There was a brief standoff and after a police officer attempted to arrest a woman, 50 or so protesters surrounded the officers and some protesters threw paint on the police. At 6 p.m. riot police began firing tear gas at the marching protesters. The protesters continued to regroup and, at one point, sat down with linked arms in the intersection of 14th and Broadway near the plaza. The protest was declared an unlawful assembly and protesters told to leave or be subject to arrest The march continued around the city until about 9:30 p.m. when the protesters returned again to the plaza which was barricaded and guarded by 100 police officers in riot gear. Some protesters threw water bottles and other objects at the police after which police issued dispersal orders, which failed to disperse the crowd. Police then fired tear gas and beanbag rounds at some remaining protesters.

Oakland police chief Howard Jordan denied the use of flashbang grenades and said that the explosions came from M-80 firecrackers thrown by protesters. There were conflicting reports between protesters and police over whether the loud noises and explosions came from flashbang grenades or M-80 firecrackers

One protester, Iraq War veteran Scott Olsen, suffered a skull fracture caused by a projectile that witnesses believed was a tear gas or smoke canister fired by police. He was rushed to the hospital by other protesters, who were struck with unknown projectiles while attempting to aid him. At least two other protesters were also injured. The American Civil Liberties Union and National Lawyers Guild called for an investigation into the use of alleged use of excessive force by some Oakland police officers.

=== Second plaza occupation ===
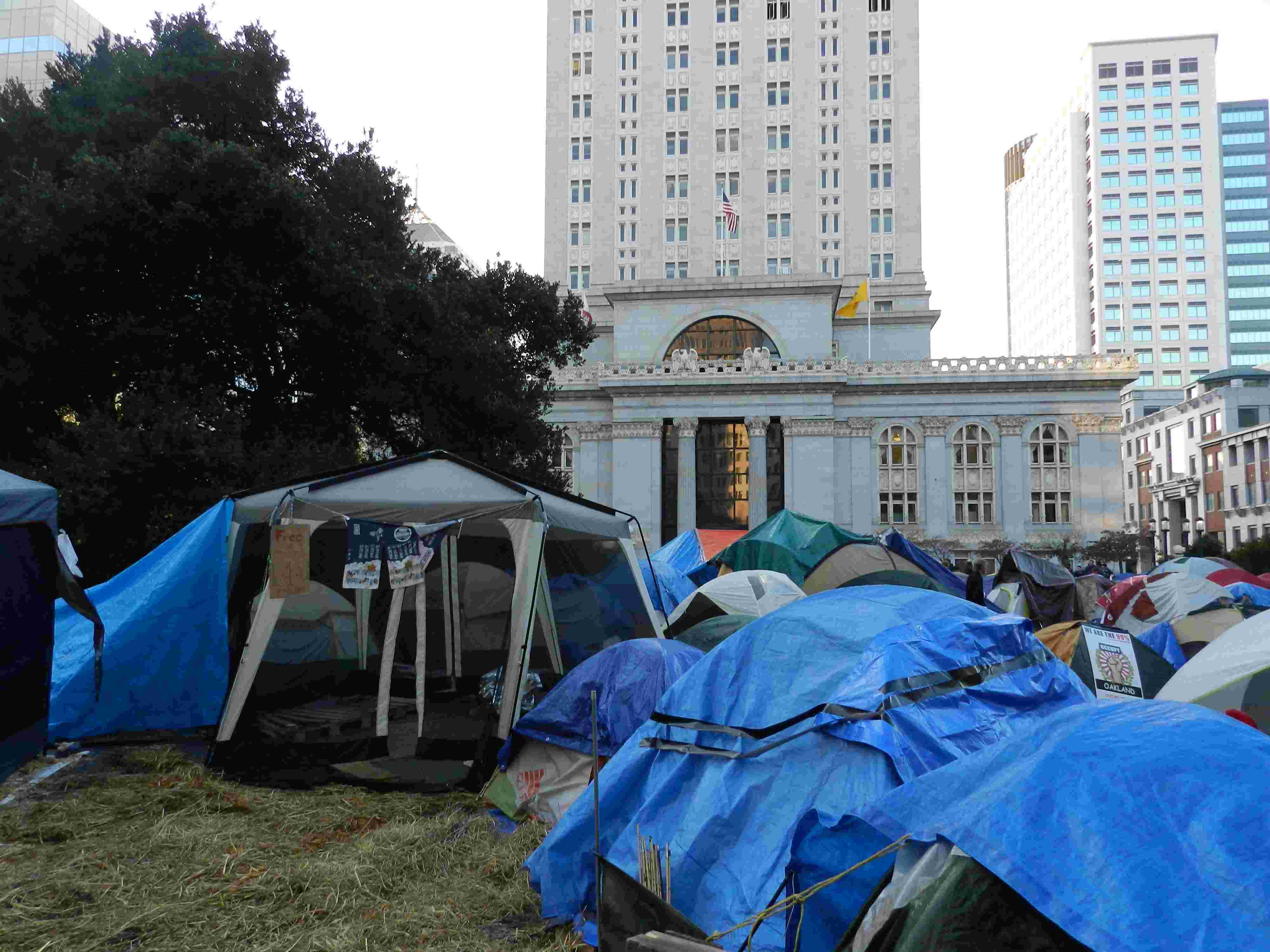
Tents within the protest camp of Occupy Oakland at Frank H. Ogawa Plaza on November 12, 2011. Oakland City Hall stands in the background.

October 26, the day after the police raid, between 1,500 and 3,000 people gathered for a speak-out and general assembly in the plaza's amphitheater. The grassy area of the plaza was empty and surrounded by chain link fences. The general assembly voted to organize a general strike for November 2. The fences were torn down by protesters chanting, "Whose park? Our park!" and one tent was erected. Mayor Jean Quan issued a statement urging non-violence and asked that there be no overnight camping, however the city did not take steps to prevent protesters from re-occupying the plaza.

The plaza was occupied for 18 days, from October 26 to November 14, and the "miniature city" grew to about 180 tents. A medical tent staffed by members of the California Nurses Association and an interfaith tent were added to the new "miniature city". Documentary filmmaker and activist Michael Moore visited the site on October 28, 2011, and made a speech to encourage the crowd of protesters. That same day, protesters in Egypt marched from Cairo's Tahrir Square to the U.S. Embassy in solidarity with Occupy Oakland.

On November 10, a man was fatally shot about 25 yards away from the encampment. Occupy Oakland medics responded to the victim until police and paramedics arrived. Initially, there were mixed reports about whether the people involved in the shooting were connected to Occupy Oakland. Police later found that the victim, 25-year-old Kayode Ola Foster, was indeed an Occupy Oakland participant, but only for the previous few days, as was one of two possible murder suspects. In response to the shooting, demonstrators observed silence, prayed, and held a candlelight vigil for the victim led by one of the camp chaplains.

On November 15, Occupy Oakland protesters joined the Occupy Cal demonstrations at UC Berkeley.

==== November 14 police raid ====
The city of Oakland distributed notices of violation to protesters for three days from November 11 through November 13. The notices stated that the protesters were in violation of the city code by lodging overnight, obstructing the use of a public park, and making fires in a public park. In the early hours of November 14, approximately 700-1000 police dismantled the camp while supporters protested peacefully around the encampment. Police made about 20 arrests in total.

=== General strike of November 2 ===
External videos
- Raw chopper footage showing protesters on the entrance ramp to the port of Oakland
- Video of protests at Whole Foods

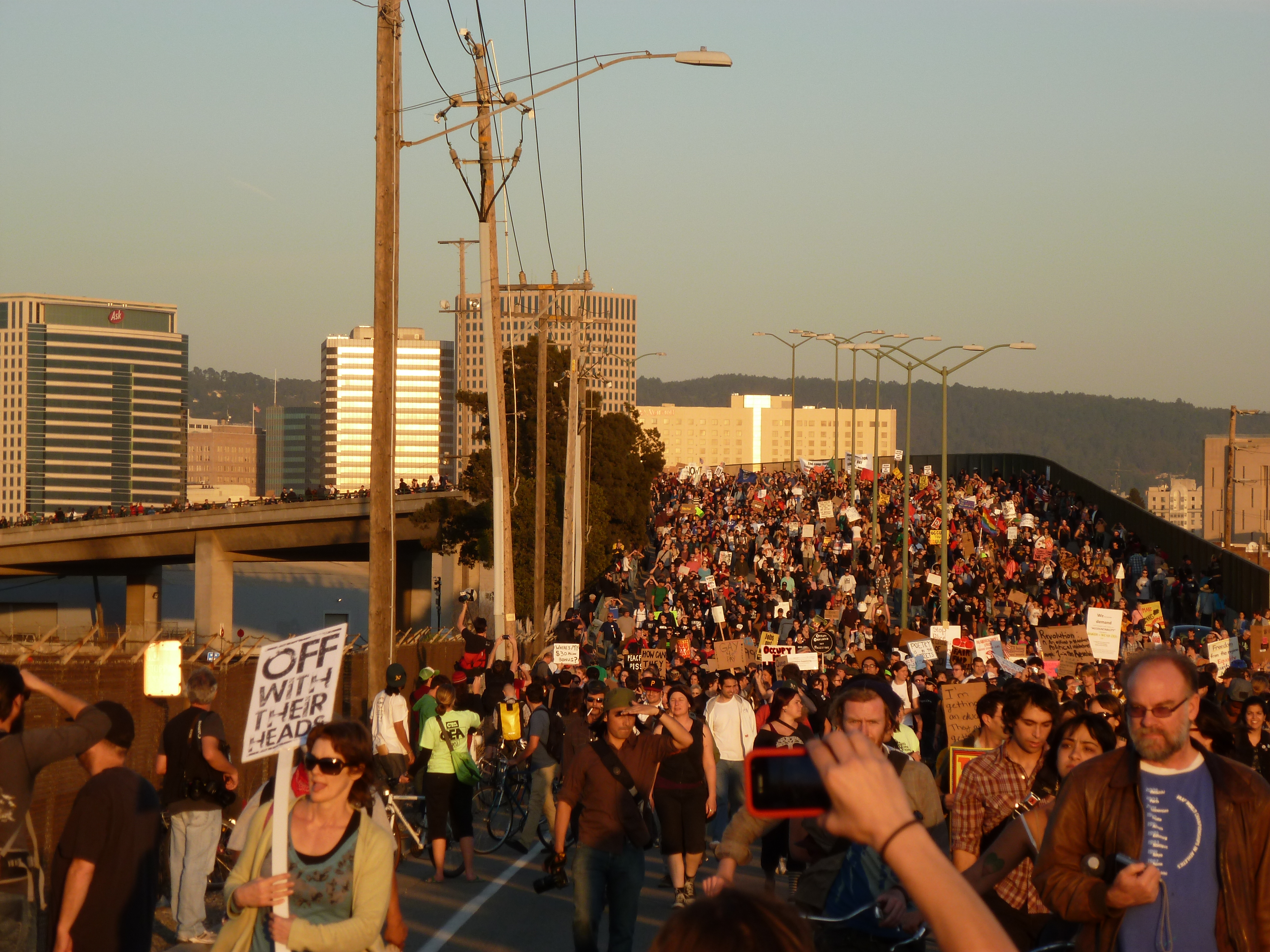
One of the marches to the Port of Oakland during the 2011 Oakland General Strike on Nov. 2, 2011

Thousands of protesters gathered at the plaza on November 2 to participate in rallies, marches, and teach-ins designed to draw attention to economic inequity and corporate greed as part of the 2011 Oakland General Strike. The Port of Oakland, the fifth busiest port in the United States, was shut down after several thousand protesters blocked entrances to the port.

Official estimates put the number of people attending the general strike at 7,000, while organizers say there were between 20,000 and 30,000. Most of the protesters were peaceful, but some protesters smashed windows at Whole Foods and Wells Fargo, looted an art store, and plastered downtown businesses with graffiti.

The police presence was minimal during the strike, and most protesters had gone home by 11 p.m. when dozens of protesters took over a building that once housed the nonprofit Travelers Aid Society, and started a massive trash fire at 16th and Broadway that sent flames 15 feet high. Just after midnight, police declared the protest an unlawful assembly and ordered the crowd to disperse. After one officer was struck on his face shield by a bottle, officers used flash-bang grenades and tear-gas canisters to attempt to disperse the crowd. A series of clashes between protesters and police continued throughout the night with 103 people arrested in total.

=== Snow Park and Veterans Memorial camp ===
Snow Park, a small park beside Lake Merritt, was occupied on October 18 by about two dozen protesters after Frank Ogawa Plaza had filled up with tents. The Snow Park protesters initially spent time maintaining the grounds of the park. They were removed from the park by law enforcement on the morning of October 25, an hour after Frank Ogawa Plaza was raided, and six protesters were arrested. The camp was reestablished with one tent erected on October 26. The encampment grew to about 20 tents by November 13. On November 21, 100 campers peacefully left Snow Park after law enforcement arrived.

About seven protesters set up camp in front of the Veterans Memorial Building near the intersection of Harrison and Grand on Veterans Day, November 11. They were cleared out by law enforcement on November 14.

After the encampments at Frank Ogawa Plaza and Veterans Memorial were removed by law enforcement, protesters briefly occupied a vacant lot in the Uptown neighborhood in downtown Oakland from November 19 to November 20. Demonstrators took down fences and set up tents, hung banners, and had an impromptu dance session in the rain, powered by a sound truck. Some nearby residents were opposed to the new occupation location due to noise issues.

=== Port shutdown of December 12 ===
On December 12, the Port of Oakland was again shut down as Occupy Oakland protesters participated in a West Coast shutdown of ports. At the Port of Oakland, hundreds of protesters stayed overnight and successfully stopped the 3 am shift of ILWU workers from entering the Port to work. The crowd eventually dispersed peacefully with no arrests or even police presence.

=== Anti-police Saturday evening marches of 2012 ===
Starting the first Saturday of January, some supporters of Occupy Oakland began a series of what they called "Fuck The Police" (FTP) protests. Officials estimated that policing each FTP in January cost the City about $50,000.

A statement issued prior to the January 14 "FTP" march read, in part:

IMPORTANT NOTICE: If you identify as peaceful and are likely to interfere with the actions of your fellow protesters in any way (including telling them to stop performing a particular action, grappling, assaulting or holding them for arrest), you may not want to attend this march. It is a militant action. It attracts anti-capitalists, anti-fascists and other comrades of a revolutionary bent. It is not a march intended for people who are not fully comfortable with diversity of tactics.

The move to a "diversity of tactics" worked to undermine public support, which some non-violent Occupy participants alleged was the work of infiltrating 'agents provocateurs'."

=== "Move-in Day" (January 28) ===
External videos
- Footage from city hall showing vandalism
- Mass arrest attempted at 19th St.
- Occupy Oakland 1/28/12 footage

On January 28, Occupy Oakland protesters had planned a 'move-in' day to take over a vacant building and establish it as a social center. The target for occupation was the long-vacant Kaiser Convention Center. Organizers kept the building targeted for takeover a secret, so the exact route was a mystery to most of the marchers. After winding through Laney College, the crowd ended up at the vacant Henry J. Kaiser Convention Center, where police had established a line. Some protesters carried plastic garbage cans cut into shields in preparation for confrontation with police.

Police first attempted arrests near Telegraph Ave and William St. This attempt failed when protesters were ordered to disperse. As police attempted to clear the protesters, the marchers overturned a chain link fence and fled across a vacant park. The march continued heading up Telegraph towards 20th. Three officers were injured in the skirmish between Occupy protesters, as protesters threw bottles, metal pipe, rocks, spray cans, improvised explosive devices, and lit flares, police said, in a large skirmish on the front steps of the Oakland Museum of California. The most seriously injured officer received a cut to his face that required stitches after a protester hit him with a bicycle. The other two injured officers received bruises, and one injured his hand. Police again stopped the march on Broadway between 23rd and 24th. Police announced over loudspeaker to the kettled crowd: "Marchers, you have failed to disperse after several lawful orders. You are now under arrest". There were 409 arrests at Occupy Oakland on January 28, but only 12 of those arrested were charged.

Critics alleged that police engaged in kettling and failed to issue the required audible dispersal order prior to arrests. Several journalists reported being arrested or placed in restraints. In response, The Newspaper Guild released a letter protesting Oakland Police's actions that day.

Over the course of the day, the Oakland Police Department received more than 1,700 calls for service elsewhere in Oakland that were delayed or not responded to because of the strain on resources dealing with protesters. More than 480 of those were 911 calls.

=== "Aquapy" Lake Merritt ===
On December 15, police evicted a floating encampment, "Aquapy Lake Merritt". Subsequently, a second "Aquapy encampment" returned to the Lake. On January 31, 2012, eviction warnings were served on the second Aquapy. The police foreclosed Aquapy 2.0 on the evening of February 1.

== Occupied Oakland Tribune ==
The Occupied Oakland Tribune was founded on November 2, 2011, by Scott Johnson in anticipation of the General Strike happening later that day. It was inspired by the Occupied Wall Street Journal and similarly featured color, four-page news, distributed for free, about the Occupy Oakland movement. After two issues, on January 6, 2012, the Bay Area News Group (BANG, which owns the Oakland Tribune) sent a cease and desist letter to the Occupied Oakland Tribune, alleging their name, web-domain and altered Tribune tower logo infringed the company's trademark. BANG's lawyer stated that Johnson must stop publication and hand over his access to OccupiedOakTrib.org domain immediately or face a lawsuit.

== Local government reaction ==
The reaction of local politicians and city officials was mostly positive at first. In fact, Oakland councilmember Desley Brooks was among the protesters sleeping in tents on the inaugural night of the encampment. Councilwoman Jane Brunner expressed support for the movement by stating, "It's about time people are speaking up." Mayor Jean Quan visited the protest site the next day on October 11, 2011, and according to KCBS, condoned the occupation but asked that campers not urinate on plaza's large oak tree because it has shallow roots. City administrator spokeswoman Karen Boyd said that the city's plan was to let the protesters stay "As long as they are peaceful and respectful of the rights of all the users of the plaza.". Bay Area U.S. Congress members Barbara Lee and Pete Stark also released statements of support.

The Alameda County Health Department inspected the camp on October 19. The next day, October 20, the City of Oakland published and distributed an official notice of violation citing the camp for fire, safety, and sanitation hazards. The city issued violation notices threatening arrest for the next few days. The 300 to 400 demonstrators "appeared determined not to leave" and countered that "complaints about rats, drug crimes and violence in the area of 14th Street and Broadway went unchecked before they arrived."

In response to the mayor's support for the November 2 general strike, the Oakland Police Officer's Association issued an open letter to the citizens of Oakland expressing "confusion" about Mayor Quan's decision making. The open letter took issue with Mayor Quan's decision to allow public employees to participate in the upcoming general strike:

[T]he Administration issued a memo on Friday, October 28th to all City workers in support of the "Stop Work" strike scheduled for Wednesday, giving all employees, except for police officers, permission to take the day off. That's hundreds of City workers encouraged to take off work to participate in the protest against "the establishment." But aren't the Mayor and her Administration part of the establishment they are paying City employees to protest?

On November 3, the City Council met to consider a resolution by council member Nancy Nadel supporting the Occupy Wall Street protest movement and urging Mayor Jean Quan to collaborate with Occupy Oakland. After more than 100 members of the public spoke—many opposing the resolution—Nadel withdrew her proposal, conceding "We don't have the votes tonight for this resolution."

On November 9, five members of the Oakland City Council, Desley Brooks, Ignacio De La Fuente, Patricia Kernighan, Libby Schaaf, Larry Reid (councilmember), two dozen clergy, and Oakland business owners held a press conference calling for the immediate eviction of Occupy Oakland. The group alleged that the ongoing protest had harmed the economy of downtown Oakland, and cited reports of fire hazards in the camp. Occupy protesters interrupted the press conference by chanting, "We are the 99 percent of Oakland." The council members counter chanted: "Occupy Oakland must go." The press conference ended earlier than anticipated.

Oakland city officials estimated the Occupy movement cost the city $2.38 million in police overtime pay, private security and mutual aid, not including costs of the Port of Oakland protests and not accounting for insurance policy reimbursement. The estimate was a revision of the $5 million figure provided by Mayor Quan.

== Police conduct and controversies ==
Throughout the time of Occupy Oakland protests, there were numerous complaints of alleged police misconduct coming from their actions in relation to the Occupy Oakland protesters.

=== Scott Olsen head injury on October 25 ===
External videos
- "Occupy Oakland video: Riot police fire tear gas, flashbang grenades." Oakland police fire tear gas against protesters. Oct. 25. Scott Olsen can be seen being evacuated at :58—1:23.
- "Occupy Oakland video: Interview with Scott Olsen About His Injury from the Police Attack on October 25th, 2011." Scott Olsen discusses the events of Oct 25th, his injuries, and the Oakland police department investigation

On October 25, 2011, Scott Olsen, a 24-year-old former Marine and Iraq War veteran, suffered a skull fracture caused by a projectile that some witnesses claimed was a tear gas or smoke canister fired by police.

A video by protesters shows an explosion of something near protesters attempting to aid Olsen. The Associated Press later reported that it was not known exactly what kind of object had struck Olsen or who had thrown or fired it, but that protesters had been throwing rocks and bottles. The Guardian reported that a projectile found near where Olsen fell was a bean bag round although they could not confirm if that round hit Olsen. Olsen was rushed to the hospital where doctors said that he was in critical condition. At least two other protesters were also injured. The American Civil Liberties Union and National Lawyers Guild are calling for an investigation into the alleged use of excessive force by Oakland police. The investigation by the Citizens Police Review Board is lasted several months.

Olsen served two tours of duty as a data network specialist in the Iraq War, was awarded seven medals (including the Navy-Marine Corps Achievement Medal), and received an administrative discharge as a lance corporal in November 2009 after serving four years. While still an active-duty servicemember, Olsen created a website called "I hate the Marine Corps" as a forum for "like-minded grunts to vent". Despite the site's title, Olsen insists he doesn't in fact hate the Marine Corps, nor does he regret his enlistment.

At least 1,000 people held a candlelight vigil for Scott Olsen in front of Oakland City Hall on October 27, 2011. He was released from the hospital around November 10, and eventually recovered from his injuries but continues to have some difficulty speaking although he plans to try and rehabilitate himself from his injuries. Olsen was subsequently interviewed on three nationally televised cable news shows: MSNBC's The Ed Show (Nov. 29), MSNBC's The Rachel Maddow Show (Dec. 1) and Current TV's Countdown with Keith Olbermann (Dec. 2).

In March 2012, a report revealed Olsen was hit by a beanbag round, rather than a tear-gas canister as had been suggested. In March 2014, the City of Oakland agreed to pay a $4.5 million settlement to Olsen.

In July 2014 an arbitrator ordered the full reinstatement with back pay of the only police officer fired in connection with the Occupy protests. Officer Robert Roche had been terminated for unreasonable use of force when there was no immediate threat to officers and for violating the department's policy on use of tear gas. Arbitrators have reduced or revoked police disciplinary measures in 12 of the past 15 union-mandated discipline arbitrations. Officer Roche, a SWAT officer and firearms instructor, had previously been involved in three fatal police shootings but was cleared of wrongdoing in all.

=== November 2–3 arrests and allegations of beating, shooting and excessive force ===
External videos
- "Shot by police with rubber bullet at Occupy Oakland" Filmed by Oakland resident Scott Campbell, moments before being shot by an Oakland Police officer.
- "Iraq war veteran Kayvan Sabehgi beaten by a police officer"

Scott Campbell was video recording members of the Oakland Police Department during an Occupy Oakland protest on the night of November 2–3, 2011. Shortly before 1 am on November 3, he was shot by police using a less-lethal round while he was filming a stationary line of police in riot gear, hours after the 2011 Oakland general strike but during ongoing street clashes between protesters and police in what the San Francisco Chronicle described as "chaos after midnight. Masked vandals shattered windows, set fires and plastered downtown businesses with graffiti before police moved in, dispersing crowds with tear gas and flash-bang grenades and making dozens of arrests."

The apparently unprovoked shooting of Campbell was documented by the resulting point-of-view video from his own camera. University of South Carolina criminal justice professor Geoffrey Alpert said that unless something occurred off-camera to provoke the officer, the officer absolutely could not fire at Campbell.

Also on the night of November 2, Kayvan Sabeghi was hit with a baton numerous times by a police officer then arrested. As police handcuffed him during his arrest, Sabeghi declared that he was a veteran to a nearby KTVU TV-2 news camera, claiming: "I had two tours in Iraq, one tour in Afghanistan." However, a U.S. Army spokesperson said on November 11 that the Army has no record of Sabeghi being deployed to Iraq or Afghanistan. Sabeghi was charged with resisting arrest and remaining at the scene of a riot. While in police custody, he complained of severe pain and was later transferred to Highland Hospital, where he was treated in the intensive care unit.

Journalist Susie Cagle was arrested in the early hours of November 3 and spent 14 hours in custody although she was wearing her press pass while working. She was charged with failure to leave the scene of a riot. Additionally, Cagle claimed that she had been subject to and witnessed mistreatment of protesters during her detainment. Cagle was again arrested during an Occupy Oakland march on January 28, 2012, although she was not in possession of a valid press pass at the time.

=== General strike marchers struck by car on November 2–3 ===
External videos
- "Protesters struck by vehicle" Footage of the incident

During the evening march to the Port of Oakland as part of the general strike on November 2, protesters were struck by a car in an incident recorded on video. Two protesters were banging on the hood of the car and blocking its path and then the car hit them. They both suffered minor injuries including a broken ankle and internal injuries and later filed suit against the owner of the car. Nine days later, two victims held a press conference alleging that the incident was a criminal act and demanded that the driver be prosecuted. In 2012, the two protesters filed a federal lawsuit against the Oakland Police and BART police claiming that their civil rights were violated when police let the drivers leave the scene without what they claim is a "formal investigation."

=== Name covering ===
External videos
- "OPD covering name badge before raid at Occupy Oakland" Footage of the incident

On the Nov. 2 protests, Officer John Hargraves was filmed with black tape over his name on his police uniform. When questioned by a civilian, Officer Hargraves refused to respond. The civilian then spoke with Lt. Clifford Wong, one of several nearby officers. Lt. Wong approached Officer Hargraves and removed the tape from the officer's uniform.

Internal Affairs Division learned of the events on November 4 and began an investigation. Due to their conduct, Officer Hargraves was suspended for 30 days but not terminated pending a disciplinary appeal, and Lt. Wong was demoted to the rank of Sergeant.

In January 2012, a US District Court judge described the events as "the most serious level of misconduct" as classified by a 2003 court settlement. The officer claimed that he concealed his name to protect himself and his family after a supervisor described a video in which an Occupy protester posted the name and address of another officer and called for burning down his home. The judge noted that it is a crime for officers to conceal their name or badge number and that safety was not a legitimate basis for breaking the law.

=== Move-in Day arrests ===
January 28 had been designated "Move-in Day" by some members of Occupy who intended to occupy an unspecified location and transform it into a social center.

Oakland Police arrested 409 individuals in the largest arrest in Oakland history. Among those arrested were at least six journalists, Kristin Hanes of ABC News-KGO, Susie Cagle, Gavin Aronsen of Mother Jones, Vivian Ho of the San Francisco Chronicle, John C. Osborn of East Bay Express, and Yael Chanoff of San Francisco Bay Guardian.

After her release, Yael Chanoff of the San Francisco Bay Guardian, alleged that she had witnessed police brutality and cruel treatment of prisoners in custody.

The local chapter of National Lawyers Guild released a statement on Jan 30. In it, the guild alleged a number of human rights abuses, including hundreds of unlawful arrests, physical assaults. The statement alleged that many imprisoned protesters were being denied counsel or being denied medical care or medications. The statement also called for action from the court monitor

On January 31, charges were dropped for all but 12 of the 409 arrested individuals.

== Protester conduct and controversies ==
=== Violent tactics and alleged infiltration by agents provocateurs ===
The Occupy Oakland movement has attracted particularly strong controversy for its tactics. During protests, police have confiscated knives, scissors, mace, and tear gas, as well as large corrugated metal shields from protesters. Protesters have also been recorded throwing bottles, metal pipe, rocks, spray cans, improvised explosive devices, and lighting flares at police. Protesters have slashed tires and invading vacant buildings during protests, and Oakland citizens have expressed concern that the protests have necessitated a large police presence which has made the rest of the city less safe. Several Occupy organizers and supporters claim that various groups, including some agents provocateurs, infiltrated Occupy Oakland in order to subvert and co-opt the movement, and/or discredit it by causing disruption.

At an Occupy General Assembly on January 29, protesters expressed a schism in the movement, with some claiming Occupy Oakland had strayed too far from its grassroots ideologies of economic justice, and claiming use of violence was detrimental to the movement in general. The Occupy Bay Area Jewish Contingent, another Occupy movement, has sought to distance itself from Occupy Oakland, saying it had been "hijacked" by violence. Members of Occupy Sacramento blamed Occupy Oakland members for at least one incident of violence in their city.

=== City Hall break-in ===
This past weekend, though, should clear away any sympathy for the protests and doubt about the movement's downward direction. Outside their ranks, it's hard to imagine anyone supporting the dead-of-night rampages and hooded demonstrators. Lost entirely amid the vandalism and bottle throwing is the movement's original message of economic disparity.

— Jan. 31 San Francisco Chronicle editorial on the City Hall incident.

On the night of January 28, 2012, Occupy Oakland protesters reconvened at Frank Ogawa Plaza, entered and vandalized City Hall, following the day of clashes during which 409 were arrested. Members of Occupy Oakland were seen on surveillance video prying open the building's doors and throwing garbage inside the building, knocking over a 100-year-old replica of the city hall and damaging a children's art exhibit before taking several items, including an American flag, and setting it on fire. Protesters also smashed display cases, broke down doors, overturned vending machines, damaged a classroom, cut wires in the building and sprayed graffiti inside.

The action was criticized by Oakland Mayor Jean Quan, who likened it to a "tantrum," as well as the Oakland City Council, and Police Chief Howard Jordan, while members of Occupy Oakland blamed the Oakland Police, claiming that they were at fault for violence in the protests. At least 12 protesters facing misdemeanor charges were issued stay-away orders barring them from being near City Hall. Protesters alleged the orders were unconstitutional, while city officials contended the orders kept the Occupy protests from being infiltrated by those who had an "organized strategy to riot, clash with police officers, vandalize property and wreak havoc upon the city." Quan said the city would seek monetary compensation from protesters responsible for the damage in city hall, as well as community service cleaning up East Oakland.

=== Position on Israeli-Palestinian conflict ===
In February 2012, Occupy Oakland suggested that Israel had "prodded" the United States into the wars in Afghanistan and Iraq and they overwhelmingly endorsed a proposal in support of the Boycott, Divestment and Sanctions movement against Israel. Individual protesters interviewed by Jewish publication Jweekly, indicated the move was aimed primarily at seeking justice for Palestine, but the move drew criticism from the pro-Israel Jewish community as well as several Jewish leaders in the Occupy movement. In a separate opinion piece, Jweekly said Occupy Oakland was in danger of costing the entire Occupy movement its support from the pro-Israel Jewish community.

=== Alleged hate crimes ===
Three Occupy Oakland members faced charges of felony robbery and hate crimes stemming from a February 22 event where they allegedly battered and robbed a woman. The unidentified 20-year-old woman was walking down Piedmont Avenue from a Wells Fargo bank when she said she overheard Occupy Oakland members calling for a riot, and the told them not to riot in her neighborhood. According to the Oakland police, she was then surrounded by protesters Michael Davis, 32, Nneka Crawford, 23, and Randolph Wilkins, 24, "and battered as they yelled vulgar epithets regarding their perception of her sexual orientation" before taking her wallet. The woman contacted police who arrested one of the three later that day, and the other two February 29. They were charged on March 2. The charges were dropped on May 21.

=== South Africa Project counter-protest ===
On February 27, members of Occupy Oakland were allegedly part of a group who attacked the South Africa Project, a group protesting violence by blacks against whites in South Africa. Around 35 members of the South Africa project were protesting at the California State Capitol in Sacramento, as around 100 San Francisco area residents and Occupy members stood nearby shouting at them. South Africa Project has attracted controversy as an alleged white supremacist group, and Occupy members claimed they had ties to Ku Klux Klan leader David Duke. The protest itself remained peaceful, but as Sacramento police and State Highway Patrol officers escorted them to a parking garage after the protest, they were attacked by about 50 Occupy Oakland protesters. The Occupy members threw cans and bottles at police before rushing the group. Two police officers were injured and three Occupy protesters were arrested. The counter protesters held an Occupy Oakland banner, and all three who were arrested were affiliated with the Occupy Oakland movement. Following the protest, members of Occupy Sacramento distanced themselves from the incident, and protesters with that movement claimed the violence began only once Occupy Oakland members arrived.

== Chronology of events ==
=== Weeks 1–4 (October 10–November 6) ===
Occupy Oakland began on October 10, 2011, with a rally attended by hundreds and protest encampment of a couple dozen tents at Frank Ogawa Plaza. and later at Snow Park. On October 15, Occupy Oakland saw crowds of around 2,500 people march and rally.

Beginning October 20, City officials distributed notices to the protesters citing "violence, assaults, threats and intimidation", among other complaints, and, forbidding lodging overnight. The demonstrators "appeared determined not to leave" and countered that "the rats, drug crimes, and violence in the area of 14th Street and Broadway went unchecked before [Occupy Oakland] arrived."

On October 25, 2011, police officers in riot gear from various Bay Area law enforcement agencies cleared the plaza and Snow Park during the early hours of the day. That evening, as protesters attempted to re-occupy the plaza, violence between the police and protesters resulted in Iraq War veteran Scott Olsen's head injury.

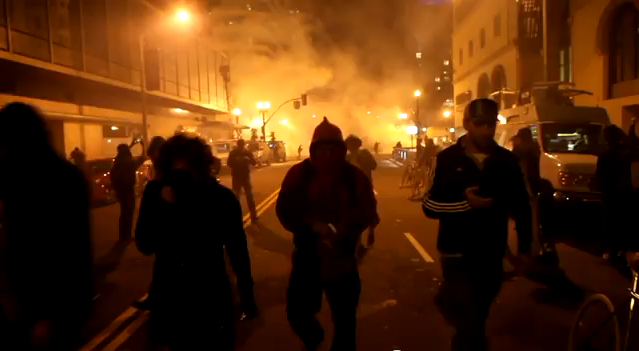
Protesters retreating east on 14th Street toward Lake Merritt after Oakland Police attempted to disperse them from Downtown with less lethal weapons.

Between 1,500 and 3,000 people gathered peacefully at the plaza on October 26, 2011. The plaza was re-taken by protesters with at least one tent erected that evening. The general assembly voted to organize a general strike for November 2.

About 2,000 people held a candlelight vigil for Scott Olsen at the plaza on October 27, 2011.

The Oakland Police Officer's Association issued an open letter to the citizens of Oakland expressing "confusion" about Mayor Quan's decision making in relation to the general strike.

Thousands of protesters gathered at Frank Ogawa Plaza to participate in rallies, marches, and teach-ins designed to empower citizens and to draw attention to economic inequity and corporate greed as part of the 2011 Oakland General Strike.

A downtown Oakland Wells Fargo branch closed for business because of roughly 100 immigrant rights protesters who marched from Occupy Oakland's encampment to protest the bank's connection to companies that run immigrant detention centers.

=== Weeks 5–7 (November 7–November 27) ===
Occupy Oakland poster advertising November 19 "Mass Rally & March" on 14 and Broadway, released on the Occupy Oakland website November 15.

On November 10, a man was fatally shot about 25 yards away from the Occupy encampment.

In the early hours of November 14, approximately 700-1000 police dismantled the camp as supporters protested. Police made about 20 arrests. This raid ended without any reported violence.

In mid-November, the city administrator's office authorized an emergency expenditure of $300,000 to employ VMA, a private security firm, to guard against further encampments by Occupy Oakland.

On November 15, the Occupy Oakland website released a flyer and information about a planned "Mass Rally & March" through Oakland due to take place November 19 to "expand the Occupy Movement". The website states the flyer was created in response to calls by the Occupy Oakland General Assembly convened on November 11.

On the morning of November 21, the last Occupy camp at Snow Park was dismantled by the city.

=== Weeks 8–11 (November 28–December 19) ===
On December 6, Oakland City Council declined to support paying additional funds to VMA, the private security firm charged with guarding against encampments at Frank Ogawa Plaza. In January 2012, the contract with VMA was not renewed.

=== January 2012 ===
On Saturday, January 28, a crowd of approximately 500 Occupy Oakland protesters unsuccessfully attempted to break into the historic Henry J. Kaiser Convention Center. This action was taken in spite of the City of Oakland's repeated advisements that peaceful assemblies, protests, and marches would be facilitated, but that the illegal breaking and entering into buildings or other criminal acts will not be tolerated. A total of 409 arrests were made.

=== February 2012 ===
On February 7, Oakland City Council held a public meeting to consider recommendations from Councilmembers Ignacio De La Fuente and Libby Schaaf to:

Adopt A Resolution Opposing Any Purposeful Upcoming Or Future Port Of Oakland Shut-Downs, Directing The City Administrator And Urging The Mayor To Use Whatever Lawful Tools We Have, Including Enforcement Of State Laws And Local Municipal Code Regulations And Requirements, To Prevent Future Shut Downs Or Disruptions Of Any Port Operations

The resolution failed to pass. Councilmembers Ignacio De La Fuente, Libby Schaaf, Jane Brunner and Desley Brooks voted in favor of the resolution. Rebecca Kaplan and Nancy Nadel voted no. Patricia Kernighan and Larry Reid abstained.

== Civil suit and settlement ==
In 2013, the Oakland City Council approved a $1.17 million settlement to 12 Occupy Oakland protesters who were injured by police. Among them was Scott Campbell, who was shot with a less-lethal round while filming officers. The settlement agreement also required that police adhere to their crowd-control policy.

== After Occupy Oakland ==
Although the tent protests were disbanded, many of those who were involved in Occupy Oakland created a new organization called Justice 4 Alan Blueford (JAB), which came together in June 2012 after Alan Blueford was killed by officer Miguel Masso of the Oakland Police the previous month. JAB members first sought to get a coroner's report, then to get a police report (shutting down the City Council in Fall 2012), and to broadly call attention to the District Attorney's and officer Miguel Masso's actions.

== See also ==
Occupy articles
- 2011 Oakland General Strike
- List of global Occupy protest locations
- Occupy movement
- We are the 99%
- Occupy the Farm

Other U.S. protests

- 2009 Oakland riots
- 2011 United States public employee protests
- 2011 Wisconsin protests
- Tea Party protests
- List of incidents of civil unrest in the United States

Police in Oakland

- Oakland Police Department
- Allen v. City of Oakland ("Riders Case")
