= Vivian Ho (journalist) =

American journalist

- Education: Journalism
- Alma mater: Boston University
- Occupations: Journalist, writer
- Writing career
- Language: English

Vivian Ho is a journalist working for the Guardian US.

== Career ==
Ho has worked for the west coast bureau of the Guardian US since 2018. Before that, she was a reporter for the San Francisco Chronicle for almost seven years, with a focus on crime and criminal justice. Prior to the Chronicle, she worked for the Boston Globe and the Worcester Telegram and Gazette as a reporter, and has bylines in Topic, San Francisco magazine, The Muse, Bustle and Marie Claire.

In 2019, her first book, Those Who Wander: America's Lost Street Kids, was published by Little A.

== Personal ==
She was raised in New England.

== Controversy ==
In 2009, Vivian Ho was profiled in her capacity as Editor-in-Chief of The Daily Free Press at Boston University.

In September 2011, Ho achieved notoriety when she was one of several journalists arrested while covering a protest of Bay Area Rapid Transit. Ho was allegedly handcuffed after identifying herself as a journalist. Her arrest drew criticism from the Chronicle.

In January 2012, Ho was again arrested covering the Occupy Oakland protest.
