= The Daily Free Press =

Student newspaper at Boston University (US)

- Type: Student newspaper
- Format: Broadsheet
- Owner: Back Bay Publishing Co.
- Editor-in-chief: Emma Clement
- Founded: May 5, 1970; 53 years ago
- Headquarters: Boston, Massachusetts
- Circulation: 3,000
- Price: Free
- Website: dailyfreepress.com

The Daily Free Press is the student newspaper of Boston University. It is a digital-first publication with daily online content and a monthly print edition on Thursday during the academic year. The Daily Free Press is staffed by about 200 volunteer editors, writers, reporters and photographers. The editorial positions change on a semester-to-semester basis. The paper is governed by a board of former editors, who make up the Board of Directors of Back Bay Publishing Co., Inc., a Massachusetts non-profit.

Commonly called the FreeP, The Daily Free Press began publishing May 5, 1970 in response to violent student protests on campus in the wake of the Kent State shootings. In the early 21st century, it is the longest-running, continuous publication at BU.

== Overview ==
Until February 13, 2009, The Daily Free Press had published an issue every instructional day since its formation. Given increasingly tight finances for newspapers and declining advertising revenue, the paper decided to discontinue its Friday issue. As of September 2011, circulation was 5,000 issues per day, Monday through Thursday.

This publishing schedule continued until September 2014, when the paper decided to switch to a daily online, weekly print publishing model. This action was intended to allow the newsroom to shift focus to a digital audience while maintaining a print presence. The weekly print edition circulated 5,000 issues each Thursday of the academic year.

Further budget cuts and concerns surrounding the mental health of editors around 2019 forced the paper to rework its printing model, and around 2019 it started printing roughly once per month.

The Daily Free Press has won numerous awards for its reporting, including the Columbia Press Association's Gold Medal Award for Excellence. In 2016, it was awarded Best All-Around Non-Daily Newspaper for Region 1 (Society of Professional Journalists) and First Runner-Up for College Newspaper of the Year (New England Newspaper & Press Association), each for its 2015 editorial year. Most recently, The Daily Free Press won New England College Newspaper of the Year in 2023.

The paper covers campus news and sports, local (Boston-area) news and publishes editorials, columns and letters each day. The Daily Free Press also has four sub-sections within its features department, each of which has its own space in the print edition each week.

In January 1980, its Arts and Entertainment coverage became The Muse, the FreeP's weekly A&E publication. In January 2018, the paper again rebranded its Features sections for clarity, and the four subsection now "Arts," "Business," "Science," and "Community." Arts is now featured online on both Mondays and Fridays. Science Tuesday began in the 1990s and was rebranded as Catalyst (now "Science") in 2015, following the paper's shift to daily, digital-first content. The features department also includes Business, (previously "InBusiness") which covers emerging businesses and includes general business reporting, and "Community," (previously "Impact") which focuses on human-interest stories. All four sub-sections are featured in the FreeP’s print edition, except for special issues.

The FreeP began publishing a news, arts and opinion blog in 2011, called The Daily Free Now, online at blog.dailyfreepress.com. The blog was rebranded during the FreeP’s digital-first transition.[3]

In January 2018, the FreeP introduced a new multimedia editor position on its editorial staff to oversee the production of the paper's weekly news podcast, "East to West" (launched in the fall of 2017) in addition to social media management, video production, and production of the paper's weekly Snapchat edition (also launched in the fall of 2017).

The FreeP launched "The Next Edition," a one-day networking conference for student journalists, in Spring of 2018, when it was hosted at Boston University's Photonics Center. The Next Edition was most recently held in Spring 2023.

The editorial staff of the FreeP is strictly volunteer. All writers, photographers and business staffers are BU students. Members of the editorial board work nights to put out the paper and regularly work 40 hours per week, in addition to their classes. Starting from Fall 2021, The Daily Free Press Board of Directors—former editors who oversee the financial and non-editorial happenings of the paper—enacted wellness rules with input from the editorial board. These guidelines promote the mental wellness of all editorial staff, allowing for nights off in favor of mental wellness, among other changes. Beginning in Fall 2022, the FreeP introduced co-editor positions for nearly all sections to continue promoting wellness in the newsroom.

Editors also implemented a hybrid approach to limit the spread of COVID-19 pandemic that remains in place today, as part of the paper's commitment to student health.

Starting in Fall 2022, FreeP multimedia section has started a new segment up and running, the Daily Free Minute: giving TikTok viewers a snippet of the news at BU and in Boston each day. The Daily Free Minute also streams on the Instagram page.

== Online distribution ==
Since January 1996, The Daily Free Press has also been published online at dailyfreepress.com. Beginning in September 2014, the website became the publication's primary daily publishing platform, as it switched to a weekly print model. It now prints roughly once per month during the academic year. In addition to the daily online content published five days per week, The Daily Free Press publishes breaking news and sports updates, often on weekends or outside of the academic calendar.

== Finances ==
In 2011, Back Bay Publishing Co., Inc., the governing body of The Daily Free Press, announced that it had paid off a $78,000 debt to its printers Turley Publications, Inc. by way of an advertising advance from the Boston University Dean of Students office. The company had discontinued Friday editions in 2009 to reduce publishing costs. There were concerns about the paper's independence in the wake of the financial announcement, but the paper continues to be entirely student-run. The university exercises no control over its content. In 2014, Back Bay Publishing Co., Inc. announced that The Daily Free Press had paid off approximately $70,000 in debt, with monies raised in a crowd funding campaign. Significant donations from Bill O'Reilly and Ernie Boch, Jr., along with several donations from alumni, family and friends, helped the newspaper raise a surplus of funds within a two-day period.

== Notable Daily Free Press alumni ==
- David Barboza, a Beijing-based correspondent at The New York Times;
- James Daly, Journalist (Wired, Forbes, Rolling Stone). Entrepreneur (Business 2.0, TED Books, Edutopia). Frequently both.
- Bruce Feirstein, an author, magazine writer and screenwriter;
- Joseph T. Hallinan, an author and 1991 Pulitzer Prize-winner for work done at the Indianapolis Star, currently reporter with the Wall Street Journal;
- Vivian Ho, San Francisco Chronicle
- Jeff Kline, an award-winning producer of children's TV programs;
- Michelle Mason, author and professor of philosophy, University of Minnesota
- Bill O'Reilly, journalist and television personality;
- Don Van Natta, Jr., author and member of The New York Times staff; received the Pulitzer Prize in 1999 & 2002;
- Lisa Anne Auerbach, artist and American travel writers.
- Samantha J. Gross, political reporter at Boston Globe; nominee for a 2018 Pulitzer Prize in investigative journalism.
- Sam Drysdale, statehouse reporter for State House News Services
- Sarah Silbiger, 2019 Pulitzer Prize winner and Visual Journalist at the Pittsburgh Post-Gazette and 2022 Pulitzer Prize winner for photography and freelancer in Washington D.C.
- Patrick Casey, writer, actor, and director- wrote Sonic the Hedgehog and Violent Night
- Andy Cohen, American radio and television show talk host, producer, and writer
- Justin Lane, 2002 Pulitzer Prize winner for photographic coverage of the terrorist attack on New York City and its aftermath
- Abbie Lin, Creative Producer at Google
- Sarah Kirkpatrick, Director of Athletic Communications at the College of the Holy Cross
- Amanda Swinhart, Photojournalist at CNN
- Dominick Reuter, Senior Reporter at Business Insider
