= Aimee Allison =

American author & activist (born 1969)

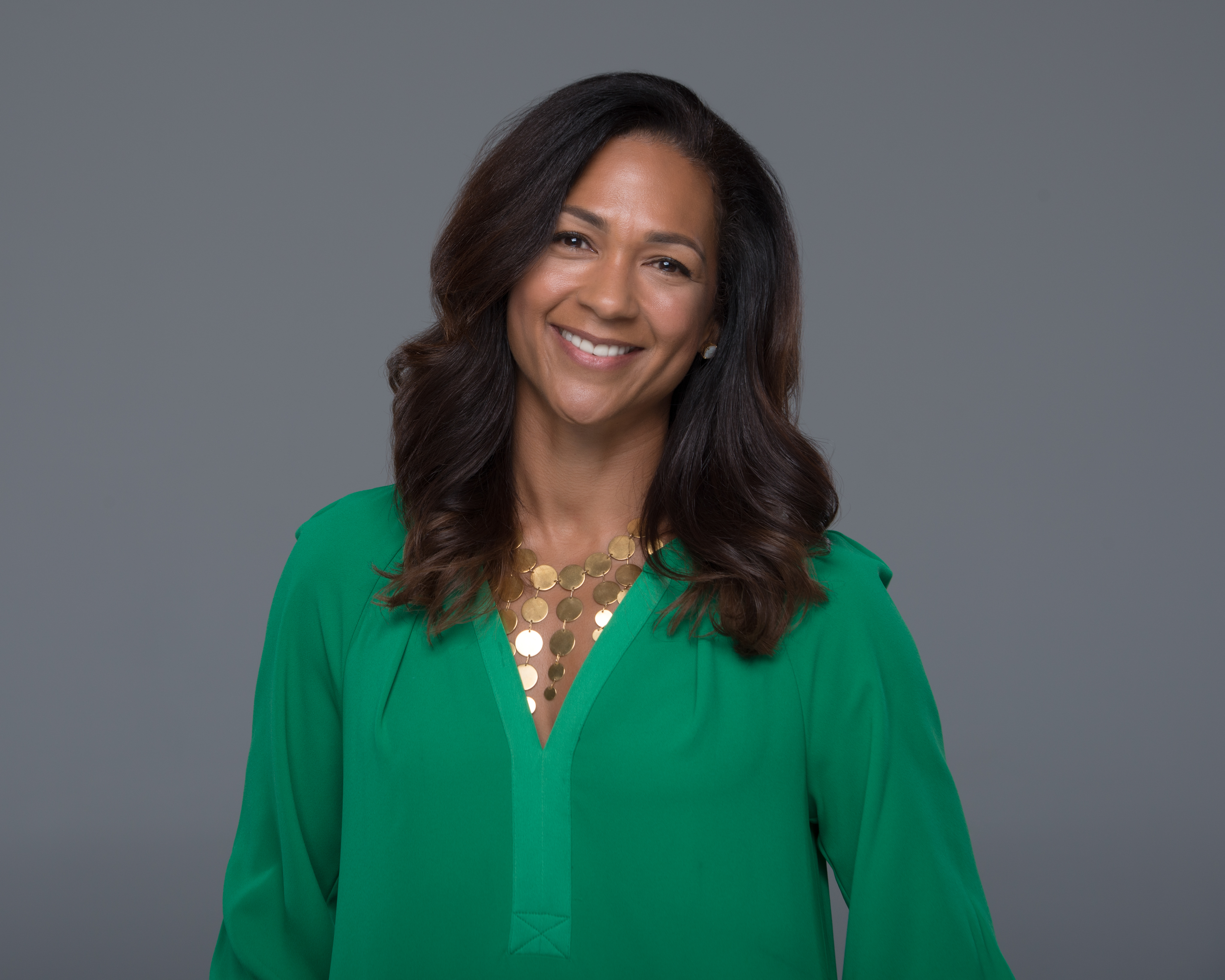
- Born: November 8, 1969 (age 56); Antioch, California, U.S.
- Education: Stanford University, B.A. Stanford Graduate School of Education, M.A.
- Occupations: Founder, She The People
- Website: aimeeallison.com

Aimee Allison (born 1969) is the founder of She the People, a national network elevating the political power of women of color.

== Early life and education ==
Allison was raised in the city of Antioch in Contra Costa County, California.

Allison holds a B.A. in history from Stanford University and an M.A. in education from the Stanford Graduate School of Education.

== Early career ==
Serving in the United States Army as a combat medic, Allison won an honorable discharge as a conscientious objector in the First Gulf War and was active in the peace movement. She is the co-author with David Solnit of the book Army of None: Strategies to Counter Military Recruitment, End War and Build a Better World which was published in 2007 by Seven Stories Press. She's also a contributor to 10 Excellent Reasons Not to Join the Military.

In 2006, Allison ran for Oakland City Council District 2, losing to Pat Kernighan. From September 2007 to December 2010, she served as co-host of the Morning Show on Pacifica station KPFA-FM in Berkeley, California. She then hosted the San Francisco Bay Area Comcast NewsMakers show that aired on CNN Local Edition.

Allison's writings have been featured in a wide range of publications, including the New York Times, Huffington Post, Essence, The Hill (newspaper), and Remezcla.

== Democracy in Color ==
Allison was the President of Democracy in Color, an organization that focuses on race, politics and the New American Majority and organized an event during the 2016 Democratic National Convention to highlight the strength and political vision of women of color in the Democratic Party, featuring Stacey Abrams and Nina Turner among others. She is also the host of the “Democracy in Color” podcast.

In 2017, Allison launched "Get in Formation," a national call for Black women to support Stacey Abrams in her race for governor of Georgia.

== She the People ==
In March 2018, Allison founded She the People to activate and mobilize women of color across the country in local and national politics and launched the inaugural She the People Summit, a national gathering of women of color transforming U.S. politics. In April 2019, Allison also organized the first presidential forum focused on women of color at Texas Southern University in Houston, TX. The forum featured Cory Booker, Julian Castro, Tulsi Gabbard, Kamala Harris, Amy Klobuchar, Beto O'Rourke, Bernie Sanders, and Elizabeth Warren.

In 2019, Allison also led listening sessions in battleground states to gather insights from women of color on the 2020 election.

== Personal life ==
Allison has lived in Oakland since 1991.

== Works ==
- Allison, Aimee; Solnit, David (2007). Army of None (First ed.). New York: Seven Stories Press. ISBN 978-1-58322-755-8.
