= Jane Brunner =

Oakland City Council member

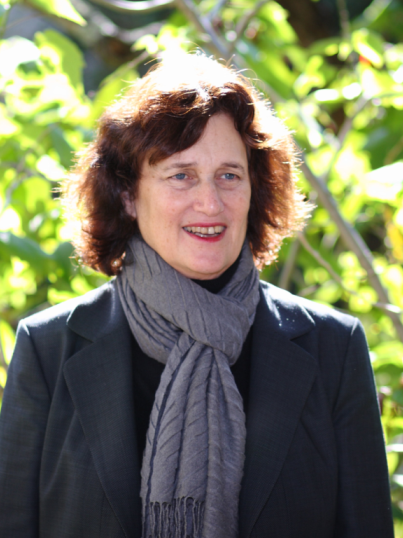

Member of the Oakland City Council from District 1
- In office 1996–2013
- Succeeded by: Dan Kalb

Personal details
- Party: Democrat

Jane Brunner is a former member of the Oakland City Council, a position she held from 1996 to 2013. Brunner is a former president of the council, a post she held for two years. She was Chair of the Community and Economic Development Committee.

Brunner holds a BA in Philosophy from University of California, Berkeley, and a JD from University of California Hastings College of the Law. She is an attorney at Siegel & Yee and has been a civil rights and labor attorney in private practice for over twenty years, with extensive experience in mediation and negotiation resolving complex, multi-party issues.

She led in the fight to adopt Measure DD that raised $198 million for open space projects on the estuary waterfront, at Lake Merritt, and along Oakland creeks.

In 2011, Brunner marched with peaceful protestors as part of the Oakland general strike.

In the November 2012 election, she chose to run for Oakland city attorney. Brunner lost the election, receiving 32% of the votes to 68% for Barbara Parker, a political newcomer but highly regarded city attorney. Seven others ran for the next Oakland City Council District 1 term, won by Dan Kalb.

She is Jewish.
