= Blatter =

Blatter is a surname. Notable people with the surname include:

- Ethelbert Blatter (1877–1934), Swiss Jesuit priest and botanist
- Heinz Blatter (born 1971), Swiss ski mountaineer
- Sepp Blatter (born 1936), former president of FIFA
- Silvio Blatter (born 1946), Swiss writer
