= Patricia Kernighan =

Californian politician

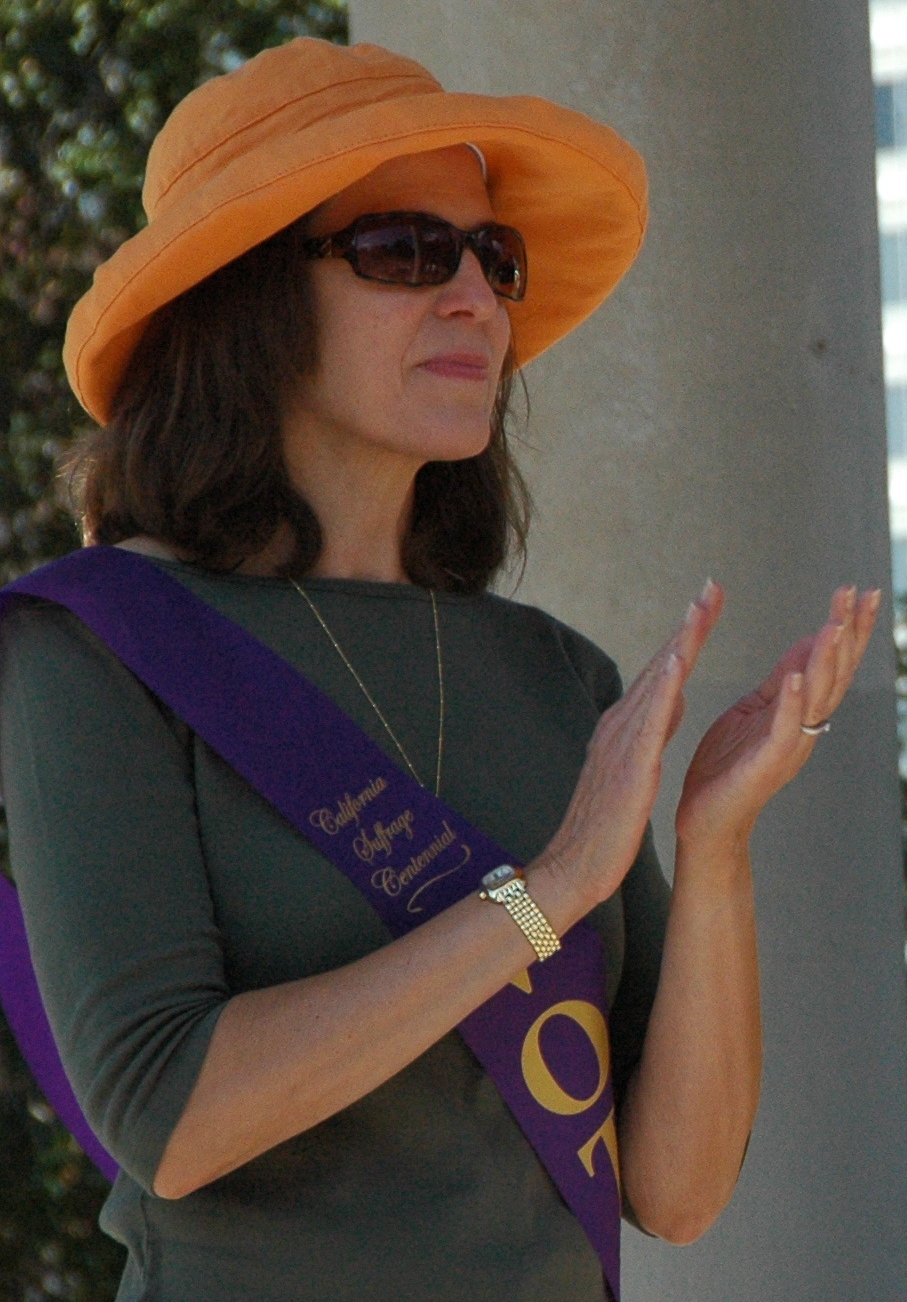
- Kernighan in 2011

Member of the Oakland City Council from District 2
- In office 2005–2014
- Preceded by: Danny Wan
- Succeeded by: Abel J. Guillen

Personal details
- Born: Eastern Washington
- Spouse: Paul Gordon
- Children: 2
- Education: University of Washington; University of California, Hastings College of the Law
- Website: PatKernighan.com

Patricia (Pat) Kernighan, a politician and a lawyer, was a District 2 city council member in Oakland, California until 2014, noted for her advocacy of instant run-off voting in city elections.

== Biography ==
Kerninghan, a native of rural Eastern Washington state, received a Bachelor of Arts degree in social sciences in 1973 from the University of Washington and a law degree in 1977 from the University of California, Hastings College of the Law.

In Seattle, Washington, while a college student in the 1970s, Kernighan was a member of the Feminist Coordinating Council, an organization that proposed a city ordinance to establish a commission on crimes against women and a protection unit.

She was admitted to the California State Bar in December 1977.

== Career ==
She was a legislative aide to Councilmember John Russo and later was chief of staff to Councilmember Danny Wan from 2000 until his resignation in 2005.

She was elected to the Oakland City Council in 2005 and reelected in a 2006 election against challenger Aimee Allison. In 2010, she defeated Jen Pae to win a third term.

Abel J. Guillen succeeded Kernighan in 2014.

== Positions ==
=== Voting system ===
In 2006, Kernighan co-authored a measure to implement instant-runoff voting in Oakland, and voters approved the measure in November 2006. Oakland began using the voting system in its November 2010 elections for mayor, three city council races and four other local offices.

=== Lake Merritt renovation ===
Kernighan co-authored a measure to fund major park renovations around Oakland's Lake Merritt. The measure passed in 2002.

== Personal life ==
She is married to Paul Gordon and has two grown daughters.
