= Papademos =

Papademos (Greek: Παπαδήμος) is a Greek surname and may refer to one of the following people:

- Basil Papademos (born 1957), Canadian writer
- Lucas Papademos (born 1947), Greek economist
