= List of killings by law enforcement officers in the United States, May 2012 =

This is a list of people reported killed by non-military law enforcement officers in the United States in May 2012, whether in the line of duty or not, and regardless of reason or method. The listing documents the occurrence of a death, making no implications regarding wrongdoing or justification on the part of the person killed or officer involved. Killings are arranged by date of the incident that caused death. Different death dates, if known, are noted in the description. The table below lists 41 people.

== May 2012 ==
Date	Name (Age) of Deceased	City, State	Description
2012‑05‑31	Epperley, Troy (37)	Boise, Idaho	Police received a call about a suicidal man armed with a gun. Officers arrived at his house and tried to talk him into dropping the weapon. One officer fatally shot Epperley when he allegedly moved towards him.
2012-05-31	Wright, Danté (20)	Brooklyn Center, Minnesota	Officers were responding to a report of a man with a gun and found Wright walking in the street with a rifle. Police say the officer told Wright to drop the gun multiple times before shooting him to death.
2012-05-31	Mullane, Sam (18)	Yachats, Oregon	Mullane was shot to death by SWAT team members in the driveway of a home. State troopers had been attempting to serve an arrest warrant. Mullane was armed and had moved to take cover when he was shot.
2012-05-28	Barrett, Anton (41)	Vallejo, California	Barrett was shot to death by officers after they tried to pull over his car and had to chase him on foot. He was reaching for what turned out to be a metal wallet.
2012-05-27	LaTour, Richard (30)	Dallas, Texas	Police responded to report of suicidal man. When officers entered LaTour's home, he reached for a gun and pointed it at the officers. They shot LaTour who died at a local hospital.
2012-05-27	Sordetto, John A. (25)	Buffalo, New York	Sordetto was shot to death by an officer who was trying to handcuff him. Police say he went for the officer's gun during a struggle.
2012-05-26	Smith, Raymond A.	Kansas City, Missouri	Police were responding to a call about suspicious prostitution activity when a man fled on foot. Two officers pursued him and allege that he fired shots at them. Both officers shot the man to death.
2012-05-26	Jackson, Gerald	Saint Thomas, U.S. Virgin Islands	Two police officers were approaching Jackson, a suspect in a murder the day before, at a carwash, when he opened fire at them, hitting one. The officers fired back and Jackson was killed. The officer Jackson shot died of his injuries several months later.
2012-05-26	Eugene, Rudy (31)	Miami, Florida	Eugene shot to death by Miami police while eating the face of Ronald Poppo (both found naked), on the MacArthur Causeway.
2012-05-24	Mestler, Peter (53)	Vallejo, California	Mestler was shot to death by officers after allegedly refusing to drop a gun he was holding, which turned out to be a BB gun. Police say he was upset because his wife was divorcing him, and that he had pulled the gun on several other people before officers confronted him.
2012-05-24	Hunter, Kevin Bernard (50)	Texas (Houston)	Two Houston Police officers were conducting covert surveillance on a house in the 2000 block of Dewalt Street. As the officers were sitting inside of their unmarked car, Hunter and another male approached the vehicle and began to beat on it and yell profanities at the officers. Hunter then began to threaten the officers and pulled out a box cutter. Hunter continued to threaten the officers and eventually stabbed one of the officers in the arm. Both officers discharged their weapon, fatally striking Hunter.
2012-05-24	Brandon, Michael (29)	Billings, Montana	Officers were attempting to arrest Brandon on a felony warrant when he allegedly fired at them and fled to a motel restroom. Police say he fired at the officers through the bathroom door and then charged at them, still firing. The officers shot and killed him.
2012-05-22	Langford, Marshall M.K. (31)	Kihei, Hawaii	Officers found Langford in a stolen vehicle. Langford allegedly drew a weapon and attempted to drive off in the vehicle. The officers fatally shot him.
2012-05-22	Smith, Andrais Darnell (32)	Dallas, Texas	Smith sold narcotics to two undercover officers. Smith then attempted to rob the officers at gunpoint. After backup undercover officers in an unmarked truck arrived, a gunfight erupted. Smith was killed by a gunshot wound.
2012-05-20	Edwards White, Elwood (22)	Oceanside, California	Police were responding to a report of a disturbance at a convenience store where a man had allegedly hit someone over the head with a glass bottle and thrown a brick through a car window. Officers found Edwards about half a mile from the store and tried to detain him. Deputy Mike Astorga shot Edwards to death when he lunged at the officers with a stick.
2012-05-19	Combs, Gray Alan Jr (22)	Springfield, Virginia	Police responded to a report of a wanted person. They found Combs hiding in a bedroom. Combs threatened officers with a sword and refused to comply with their demands. Officers opened fired with both beanbag ammunition and live rounds. Combs died at a local hospital.
2012-05-19	Holloman, Maurice (31)	Baltimore, Maryland	Officers were called to Holloman's home by his mother. Holloman attacked one of the officers, pushing him into a coffee table and allegedly going for the officer's gun. The other officers then shot and killed him.
2012-05-18	Herndon, Jace (41)	Reno, Nevada	Herndon was pulled over for driving a stolen vehicle. After exiting the vehicle, he allegedly refused to comply with the officers orders, and attempted to escape. Officers then fired and fatally wounded him.
2012-05-18	Williams, Robyn (21)	Upper Dublin, Pennsylvania	An off-duty officer rear-ended another vehicle, causing the other vehicle to burst into flames and killing the occupant. The officer failed a subsequent sobriety test, was taken into custody and charged with DUI.
2012-05-18	Jason Aaron Pierce (24)	Houston, Texas	Pierce was on a METRO bus when he became involved in a confrontation with another passenger. During the confrontation Pierce pulled out a knife and began to threaten the passenger. The bus driver stopped the bus at 11200 Fondren Road and everyone exited the bus except Pierce and the passenger he was threatening. When METRO police and Houston police responded to the disturbance Pierce began to hold the passenger at knife point. Police began to give Pierce verbal commands to drop the knife, which caused Pierce to become increasingly agitated. When Pierce began to raise the knife in a stabbing motion a Houston Police Sergeant boarded the bus and discharged his weapon, fatally striking Pierce.
2012-05-17	Azcuy, Sergio Javier	Miami, Florida	Officers set up an operation in an attempt to arrest suspects involved in narcotics trafficking. Azcuy was the passenger in a vehicle that had been pulled over. When officers ordered the occupants to show their hands, the driver complied by Azcuy made an "evasive move" and a "dark shiny object" was noted in his right hand. An officer fatally shot Azcuy, who was later found to be holding a black cellphone.
2012-05-17	Gracia, Malcolm (15)	New Bedford, Massachusetts	Shot to death by gang-unit detectives after an altercation with the officers that resulted in the Gracia stabbing one of the detectives with a hunting knife.
2012-05-15	Hightower, Clifton (27)	Atlanta, Georgia	A police officer responding to a report of homicide struck and killed a pedestrian. Witness reports that the squad car was driving 70 to 80 mph without police lights or sirens.
2012-05-14	Campbell, Dominique (41)	Washington DC	Officers were looking for a suspect involved in an earlier shooting. Campbell fired on the officers, injuring one. The officers returned fire, killing Campbell.
2012-05-14	King Jr., Brian Wesley	Lawton, Oklahoma	Shot and killed after shooting at officers and ramming police vehicles.
2012-05-13	Salgado, Carlos (44)	Des Plaines, Illinois	Salgado became involved in a physical confrontation with two officers. The officers report that Salgado attempted to run them down with his vehicle. The officers fired on Salgado, hitting him once. He was pronounced dead at the scene.
2012-05-12	Lopez, Richard (26)	El Paso, Texas	Lopez was changing a flat tire on the side of the road when an off-duty sheriff's deputy struck and killed him with his personal vehicle. The officer fled the scene but later returned and was arrested. The officer resigned on May 14, 2012 after meeting with the sheriff.
2012-05-12	unnamed male	Miami, Florida	Officers confronted a suspect regarding a recent theft. The man fled after attempting to run over the officers with his vehicle. Officers gave chase and fatally shot the suspect.
2012-05-10	Rivers, Samuel	Oakland Gardens, New York	Officers from the 111th Precinct responded to a call from a 17-year-old girl that her father was trying to commit suicide. Upon arrival, officers saw that Rivers had used a knife both on his wife and himself. After refusing to drop the weapon, officers shot Rivers in the neck and chest in an outdoor confrontation in the apartment courtyard. Mr. Rivers died and his wife Sharon was in critical condition.
2012-05-10	unnamed male (33)	Philadelphia, Pennsylvania	Officers responded to a report of a man with a gun. When officers arrived the man pointed the gun at the officers. When the suspect ignored orders to drop the weapon, he was shot multiple times. He died at a local hospital.
2012-05-10	unnamed male (22)	Newark, Delaware	An officer fatally shot a man in the chest.
2012-05-09	Hughes, Dennis	San Francisco, California	Killed in his girlfriend's apartment by a police sharpshooter after beating his mother to death when she tried to evict him from her home in Ronhert Park. Hughes had fired several shots at officers from the apartment.
2012-05-09	Hinojos-Maldonado, Jesus Eduardo (22)	Mesa, Arizona	Officers were responding to a report of a man with a gun and attempted to subdue Hinojos-Maldonado with a Taser. Two officers opened fire on Hinjos-Maldonado, killing him, after he allegedly reached toward his waistband.
2012-05-09	Williams, Davinian (35)	Jacksonville, Florida	Pulled over for erratic driving there was a confrontation between Williams and Officer Jeff Edwards. Incorrectly thinking that Williams was reaching for a gun, the officer fired, killing him. Edwards was since cleared, although the sheriff has asked that Williams be terminated for failing to follow procedure
2012-05-08	Armenta, Manuel (30)	California (Fresno)	A woman flagged down a Fresno Police officer describing a man who she thought had tried to carjack her. The officer saw a man matching the description walking near Olive and Peach. The officer tried to confront the man who then turned and approached the officer with a screwdriver. The officer used his stun gun, but the man continued. The officer fired his weapon about five times at the subject, later identified as Manuel Armenta, age 30. Armenta died at a local hospital.
2012-05-08	Brown, Raymond (28)	Philadelphia, Pennsylvania	A citizen flagged down officers in a patrol car and reported a man waiving a gun in front of a hospital. When the officers commanded Brown to drop his weapon, he fired at them. An officer fired back, striking Brown once in the thigh. Brown was rushed to the hospital and later died of his wound.
2012-05-06	Blueford, Alan Dwayne	Oakland, California	The high school senior was approached by patrolling officers just after midnight and ran, provoking an officer to chase him. Blueford allegedly pointed a gun at the officer who then fired four shots, three which hit Blueford and one which hit his own foot. The shot to the officer's foot was initially blamed on the teen, and police were referring to the incident as a shoot-out between the two men, until it was discovered the officer had shot himself. Community is waiting for evidence connecting gun found at the scene to Blueford.
2012-05-04	Luis, Gilbert (24)	San Antonio, Texas	Officers responded to a report of a domestic disturbance. Luis advanced on them with a knife. Officers shot him multiple times. He died at a local hospital.
2012-05-02	Coyle, Jamie (37)	Pawtucket, Rhode Island	Police stopped Coyle because he matched the description of a man wanted in Massachusetts. Coyle allegedly pointed a gun at the officers, who then fatally shot him.
2012-05-01	Cullen, Kenneth (48)	Mesa, Arizona	Cullen was shot to death by a SWAT officer outside his home after pointing a handgun in their direction. Police said he had asked officers to kill him.
2012-05-01	Messina, Andrew (16)	Woodstock, Georgia	Officers report they responded to a report that a woman was being held hostage by her son. The mother was able to escape their home. Using a gun, the teen broke the glass in the front door with a hostage negotiator nearby. That aggressive move prompted a SWAT sniper to fatally shoot the teen. The teen's mother reports that she was not held hostage and her call to police was made from outside the house with her potentially suicidal son inside.

== See also ==
- Death in custody § United States
- Henry A. Wallace Police Crime Public Database
- List of cases of police brutality
- List of countries with annual rates and counts for killings by law enforcement officers
- List of law enforcement officers killed in the line of duty in the United States
- List of law enforcement officers convicted for an on-duty killing in the United States
- List of shootings by US immigration agents
- List of police reforms related to the George Floyd protests
- List of unarmed African Americans killed by law enforcement officers in the United States
- Lists of killings by law enforcement officers
- Police brutality in the United States
- Police misconduct § United States
- Police riot § United States
- Police use of deadly force in the United States
