= 2011 Oakland general strike =

Protest against economic inequality

- Part of Occupy Oakland
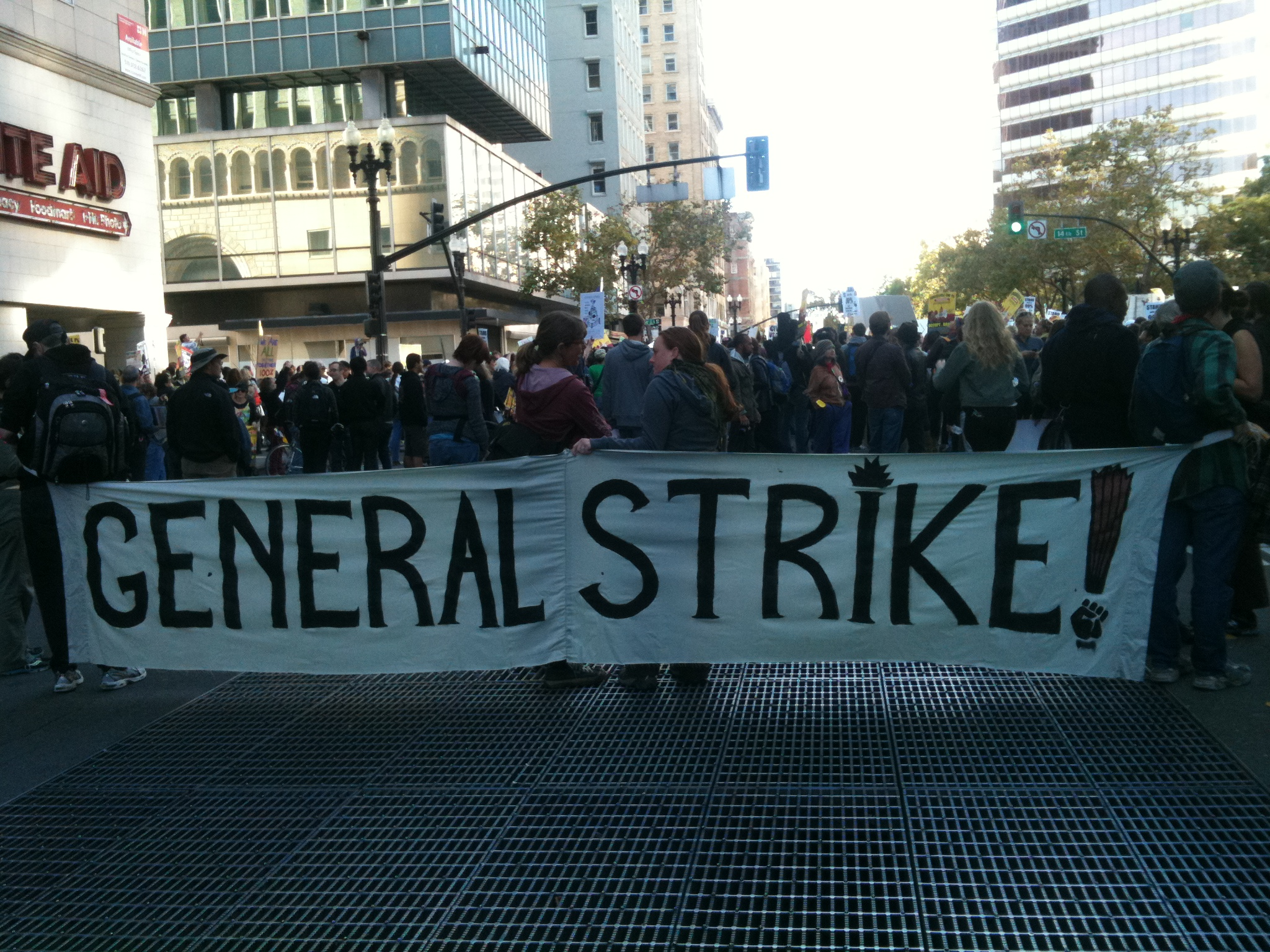
- The front of a marching crowd carrying a large banner. The banner reads "General Strike!"
- Date: November 2, 2011
- Location: Oakland, California, United States.
- Methods: Protests, rallies, marches, and teach-ins
- Result: Shut down of Port of Oakland evening shift.; Evening confrontation with police results in multiple arrests and allegations of police misconduct.; Widespread media reports of violence are condemned by Oakland mayor Jean Quan and City Council members.

Parties
Occupy Oakland

The 2011 Oakland general strike was a demonstration held in Oakland, California on November 2, 2011, as part of the larger Occupy Oakland movement.

== Demonstration ==
Thousands of protesters gathered at Frank H. Ogawa Plaza to participate in rallies, marches, and teach-ins designed to empower citizens and to draw attention to what they regard as problems with economic inequity and corporate greed. Several local unions expressed support for the demonstration, including Service Employees International Union Local 1021, Oakland Education Association, International Longshore and Warehouse Union Local 10, and United Brotherhood of Carpenters. While none of the unions were officially on strike, several urged their members to take a personal day, vacation day or to participate after work.

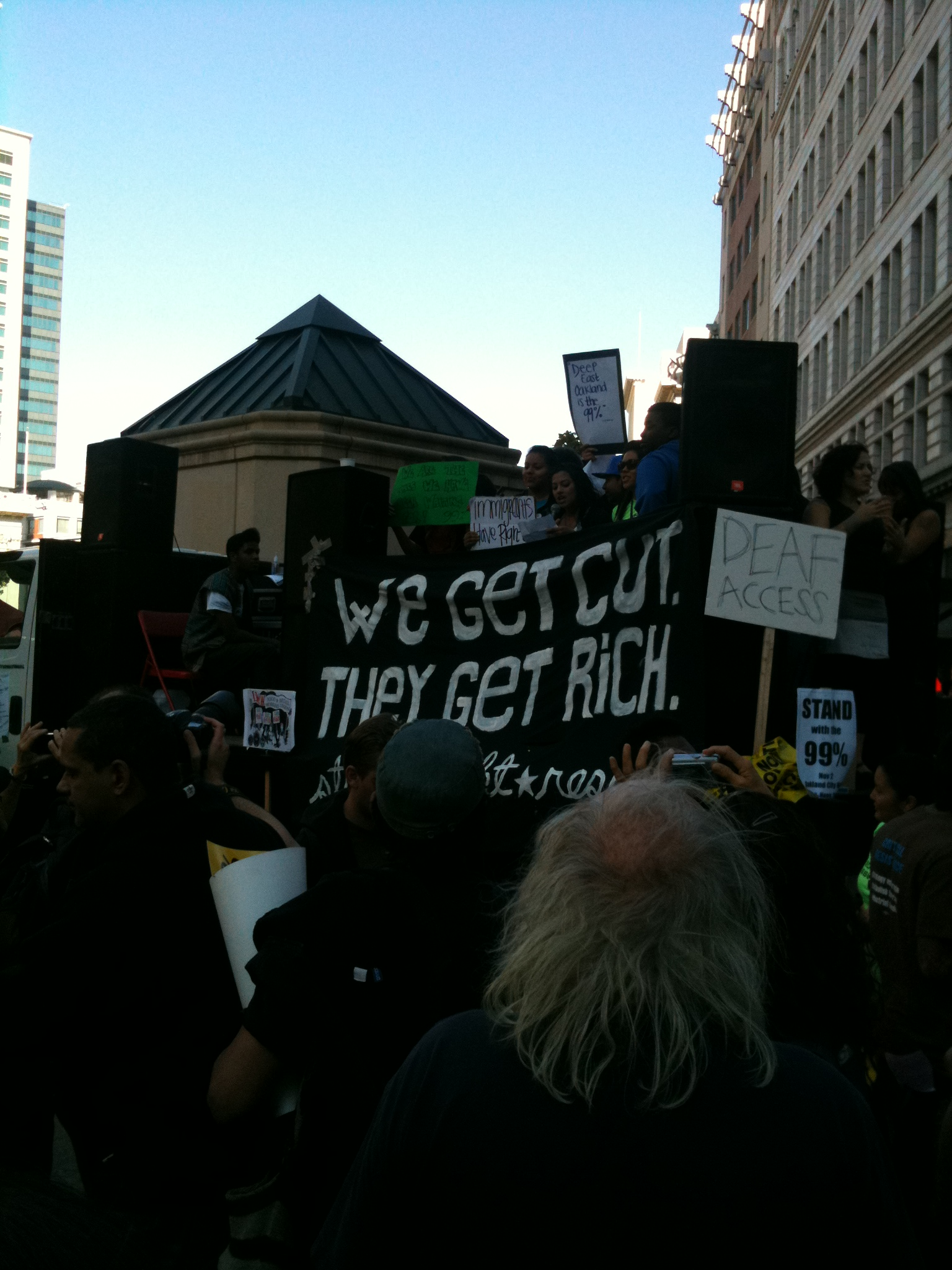
Speakers on the flatbed truck stage

A flatbed truck with a sound system was parked in the middle of the intersection of 14th Street and Broadway and used as a makeshift stage. The morning's rally began at 9 am and a range of people addressed the audience including the scholar/activist Angela Davis and musician Boots Riley.

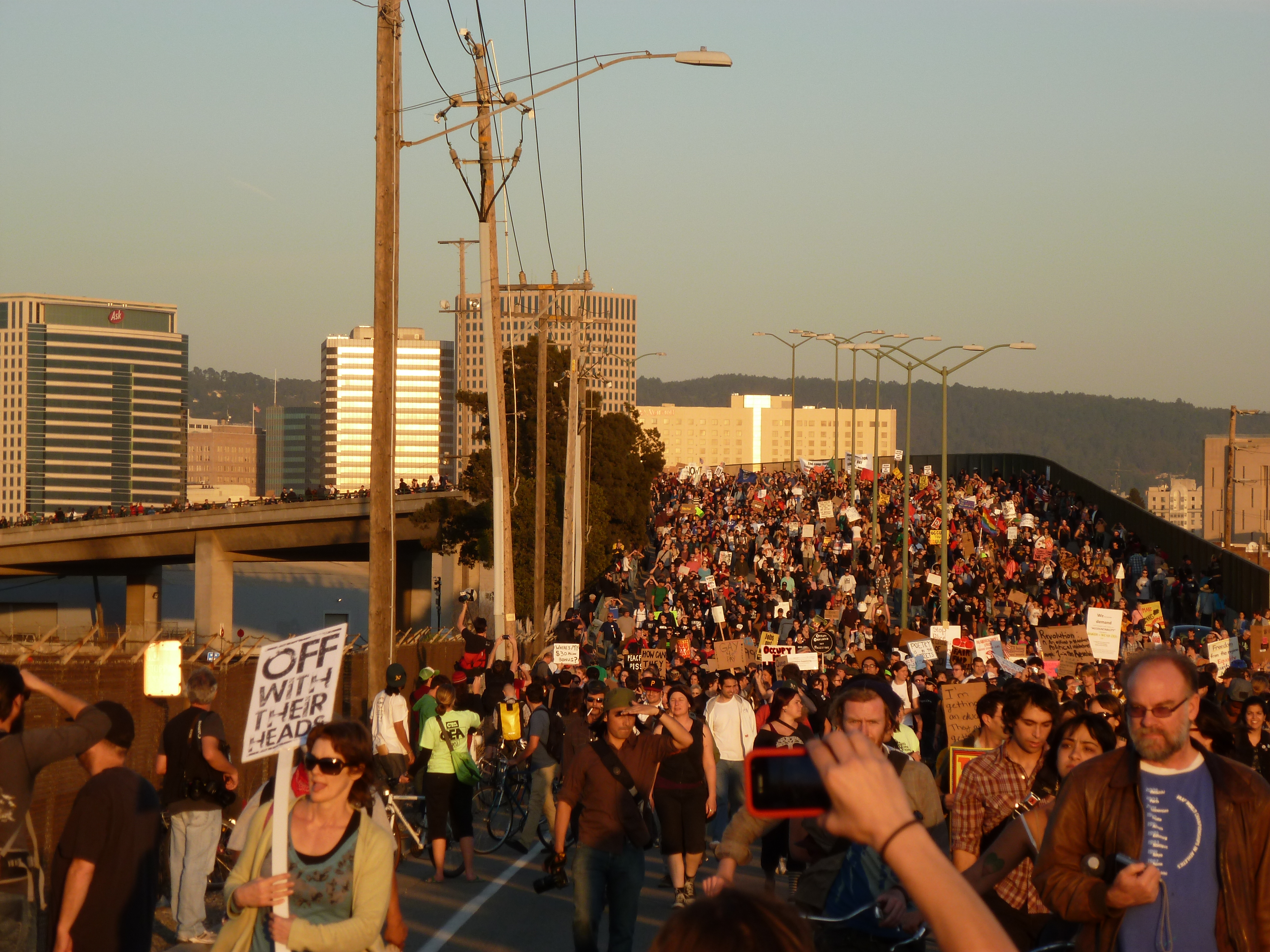
One of the marches to the Port of Oakland on Nov. 2, 2011

While most of the day-time activities were peaceful, Oakland Police chief Howard Jordan reported that a small group of "anarchists" vandalized a Whole Foods storefront, and broke windows and ATMs of Bank of America and Wells Fargo banks in the afternoon. Many buildings were vandalized, including some businesses that displayed signs of support for the protest. After the incidents of vandalism, members of Occupy Oakland guarded local businesses, boarded up broken windows, and cleaned graffiti caused by the small group of protesters utilizing black bloc tactics. Oakland mayor Jean Quan described these protesters as "a small and isolated group" that "shouldn't mar the overall impact of the demonstration and the fact that people in the 99 percent movement demonstrated peacefully and, for the most part, were productive and very peaceful."

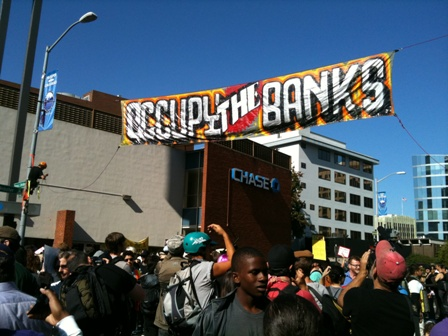
A banner hung in downtown Oakland during a bank march

=== March to the Port of Oakland ===
Thousands of protesters marched from Frank Ogawa Plaza to the Port of Oakland, the fifth busiest port in the United States, in two separate groups leaving the plaza at 4:00 pm and 5:00 pm. The number of protesters marching to the port has not been confirmed. While police estimate 7,000 people marched, local organizers and participants put the number somewhere between 20,000 and 100,000. As protesters completely filled Middle Harbor Road, the main road leading to the port, all truck traffic entering or exiting the port was halted. Port operations were "effectively shut down" a couple hours later. The Port of Oakland reportedly lost $4 million as a result of the strike.

==== Protesters injured by car ====
External videos
- "Protesters struck by vehicle" During march to port, Nov. 2

During the evening march to the port, Jan Dylan Carrigg, the driver of a silver Mercedes-Benz, was headed south on 11th Street when he encountered a stream of protesters walking along Broadway. Cell phone videofootage shows the Mercedes attempting to drive through the intersection honking at a protester to move. Lance Laverdure then responded by stopping in front of the Mercedes and began hitting it on the hood. Carrigg hit the gas and both Laverdure and a nearby protester, Margaret So, were hit by the car and sustained leg and ankle injuries. Nearby witnesses then surrounded the car as emergency personnel attended to the protesters. During this time, Carrigg switched seats with the passenger, Sara Abu-Nasser, but switched back before police arrived. Carrigg was questioned by BART police and released, angering witnesses who called for Carrigg's arrest. The two protesters suffered leg and ankle injuries and were taken to Highland Hospital. On November 11, the two victims held a press conference alleging that the incident was a criminal act and questioned why the Oakland Police Department had not prosecuted Carrigg. Victims said that nine days after the incident, they still had not been contacted by police. Lance Laverdure told press that, "We want this person arrested for the attempted murder of myself and Margaret".

== Night of November 2 ==
External videos
- "1am on Nov 3, Fire on Telegraph and Broadway"
- "CA Violence: RT footage from 'occupied' Oakland" Night of Nov. 2

=== Occupation of vacant building ===
Later in the evening, a group of protesters took over a vacant building that once served as the headquarters of the Traveler's Aid Society, a non-profit organization that provided services to the local homeless population. Police soon arrived to break up the protesters gathered outside of the building. Some protesters fled while others set a barricade on fire. Just after midnight, police ordered the crowd to disperse for unlawful assembly. Soon, one officer on Broadway was struck on his face shield by a bottle, disorienting him. Within a minute, officers launched flash-bang grenades and tear-gas canisters, beginning a series of late-night clashes between the demonstrators and police.

=== Incidents of alleged police misconduct ===
==== Scott Campbell shooting ====
External videos
- "Shot by police with rubber bullet at Occupy Oakland" Filmed by Oakland resident Scott Campbell, moments before being shot by an Oakland Police officer.

Shortly before 1 am, Scott Campbell was shot by police using a less-lethal round while he was filming a stationary line of police in riot gear. The apparently unprovoked shooting was documented by the resulting point-of-view video from Campbell's own camera. University of South Carolina criminal justice professor Geoffrey Alpert said that unless something occurred off-camera to provoke the officer, the shooting was "one of the most outrageous uses of a firearm" he'd ever seen. "Unless there's a threat that you can't see in the video, that just looks like absolute punishment, which is the worst type of excessive force," Alpert told the Oakland Tribune.

==== Kayvan Sabeghi beating ====
External videos
- "Iraq war veteran Kayvan Sabehgi beaten by a police officer"

On the evening of November 2, Kayvan Sabeghi was hit numerous times by a police officer with a baton then arrested. Sabeghi was charged with resisting arrest and remaining at the scene of a riot. While in police custody, Sabeghi complained of severe pain and asked for medical treatment. Eighteen hours after his arrest, he was transferred to Highland Hospital, where he was treated in the intensive care unit for a lacerated spleen.

==== Susie Cagle arrest and jailing ====
Although she was wearing a press pass, journalist Susie Cagle was arrested in the early hours of November 3 and spent 14 hours at 2 different jails. She was charged with failure to leave the scene of a riot. Cagle is one of several journalists covering the Occupy movement that have been arrested. Additionally, Cagle reported having been subject to and witness to mistreatment of protestors during her imprisonment.
