= Occupy movement in the United States =

2010s protest movement

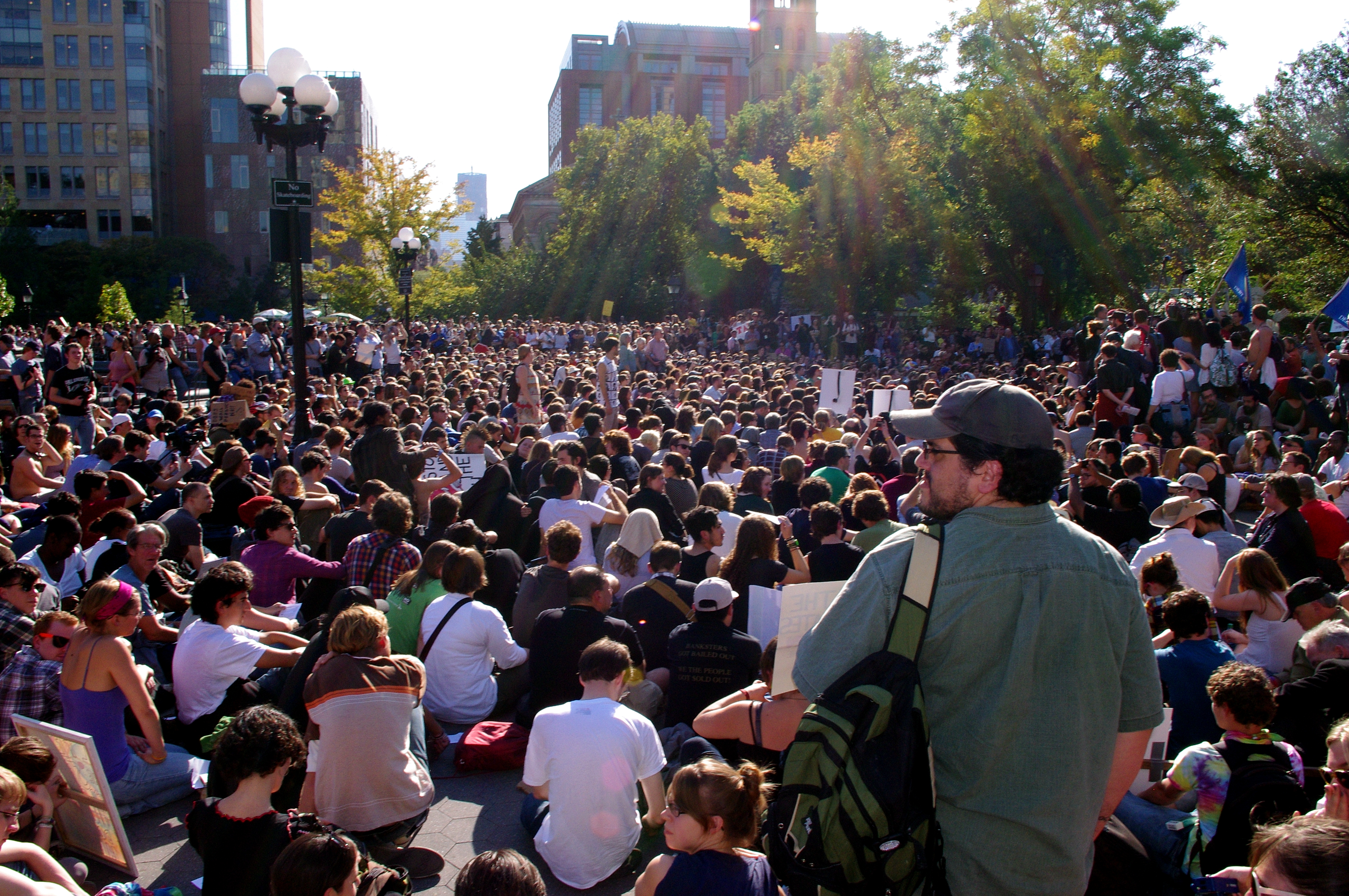
The General Assembly meeting in Washington Square Park, New York City, on October 8, 2011

The Occupy movement began with the Occupy Wall Street protests in New York City in September 2011, and spread to many other cities in the United States and worldwide. The movement sought to advance social and economic justice and different forms of democracy but each local group varied in specific aims. What follows is an alphabetical, non-chronological summary of Occupy encampments in the United States.

== Locations ==
=== Ashland, Oregon ===
Occupy Ashland included a peaceful protest and demonstration against economic inequality, corporate greed and the influence of corporations and lobbyists on government which has taken place in Ashland, Oregon, United States since October 6, 2011. The protests began in solidarity with the Occupy Wall Street protests in New York. The protests included an occupation of the downtown Plaza and a daily picket outside the JPMorgan Chase branch in Ashland. Some have felt that it is possible for the Occupy Ashland group to work together with local Tea Party members, since they both have goals of reducing the power and "stranglehold" that the upper class and the government has on the rest of the population.

The protest began on October 6 with a group of 25 protesters handing out pamphlets in front of the city's Chase Bank. Police were called to the scene, but the protesters followed the directions to not clutter the streets and no citations were issues by officers. Gene Pelham, CEO of local Ashland bank Rogue Credit Union, stated that since the start of the protests, the number of new customers accounts for the bank had doubled for the month of October.

The 25 bank protesters and more later, numbering around 250, showed up at 3 pm in the public Plaza in Ashland to attend the opening speeches. The original protest was only meant to be for two days over that weekend. However, the protesters ended up spending twenty-two days camped in the Plaza and also spent the days making small protest marches throughout the rest of Ashland, though these marches eventually dwindled. During this period, around 15 protesters were involved in the Plaza protest camp, with 40 total protesters involved in the daily marches. A group vote was held over the weekend of October 29 and the Occupy Ashland group members decided to lessen the amount of marches and camping in the Plaza. Instead, they decided to have group meetings every weekend to work on local issues, though this resulted in the loss of some members who felt that the Plaza should remain occupied, regardless of the actions of city officials.

During late November and early December 2011, Occupy Ashland members began focusing on trying to encourage students at Southern Oregon University to become a part of the protest. The group organized a march, titled Occupy SOU, with around 50 people attending and they marched from the SOU campus to downtown Ashland. The Occupy Ashland speakers told students at the event that they need to "speak out against the high amount of student loan debt." On January 16, 2012, a celebration march was held by Occupy Ashland members to commemorate Martin Luther King Jr. Day.

After Occupy Ashland had more than 300 local residents sign a petition that requested the city use a local bank for its financial endeavors, the Ashland City Council "voted unanimously" on December 20 to "conduct a review of the city's criteria for selecting a financial institution for city banking needs". Occupy Ashland member Evan Lasley stated on February 9, 2012, that, due to the group's campaign against using big banks, they have been able to convince "about 5.6 million people to move their money from big banks to community banking systems and credit unions in the last 6 months, more than all transfers in 2010."

Around 50 members of Occupy Ashland attended the Medford protest on October 15, 2011. On December 12, 2011, several of the Ashland protesters traveled to be involved in the Port of Portland protests. A protest against the National Defense Authorization Act was held on February 13, 2012, involving Occupy Ashland, Occupy Medford, Occupy Grants Pass, and Wake Up America Southern Oregon. On March 4, 2012, a "candlelight vigil" titled "March Forth on March 4th" will be held by Occupy Ashland and OSPIRG, focused on the "death of free and fair elections due to money's influence in politics", along with the problems that the in-statement of corporate personhood has caused.

As stated by Emery Way, one of the organizers of Occupy Ashland, the protest has begun to focus on specific issues, such as "opposing the Mt. Ashland Ski Area expansion, bringing a homeless shelter to Ashland and reworking the city's camping ban among other homelessness issues, and opposing local foreclosures". Way also stated that the group was planning on running some members for Mayor and City Council in 2012, though no concrete decision had been made. Another major goal of the group, as explained by organizer Keith Haxton, is to "organize an occupation of Salem in conjunction with the beginning of Oregon's 2012 legislative session".

During the early months of 2012, Occupy Ashland began working with Good Grief America to focus on "the economic and personal hardships associated with foreclosure" and have started a "Legalize Sleep Campaign" that focuses on ending homelessness.

=== Atlanta, Georgia ===
Occupy Atlanta is a protest and demonstration that began on October 6, 2011, in Woodruff Park, located in downtown Atlanta, Georgia. It is inspired by the Occupy Wall Street movement that began in New York City on September 17.

On Friday, October 6, 2011, the protesters at Occupy Atlanta did not reach a consensus on allotting time for U.S. Rep. and Civil Rights Movement icon John Lewis to address the crowd. The main argument against allowing Rep. Lewis to speak was that no one person is inherently more valuable than anyone else, and that allowing a speech at that time was not part of that day's agenda. He was invited to speak at time later in the day, during the "other business" part of the process, and this proposition was accepted by the assembly. Lewis was unable to attend because of prior commitments, but indicated that he was not offended by the incident. On October 9, the group posted an apology on its website and invited Lewis to speak. Lewis was not disappointed he wasn't able to address the crowd. After the incident, Lewis further voiced his support for the movement:

I stand with you. I support you, what you're doing to humanize American corporations, humanize the American government and look out for those who have been left out and left behind.

On November 7, 2011, Occupy Atlanta protesters camped out in a home in Snellville. It belonged to a police officer, who had contacted Occupy explaining that the house had been foreclosed upon and that he and his family were shortly to be evicted. The protesters left on the 10th after the local sheriff said that the family could be arrested for accessory to trespassing. Occupy Atlanta has stated that they hope this action, and similar ones planned in the future, will bring attention to the foreclosure crisis. A week later, Occupy Cleveland took similar action and succeeded in preventing the eviction of a family from a foreclosed home; the family were given 30 more days.

Around 1 am on Wednesday, October 26, 2011, police blocked off motor vehicle access to Woodruff Park. Mayor Kasim Reed had revoked the executive order he established that allowed the protesters to lawfully stay in the park. Reed characterized the situation as a crisis and over 150 officers with 3 helicopters using spotlights the SWAT team, and police on horseback and motorcycles were used. At one point during the arrests, protesters not in the park took over the streets. This is when police brought in their motorcycle police to try to break up the crowd that was forming on the streets. Instead of separating, the crowd of protesters marched towards the oncoming police motorcycles and forced them to turn around and head the other way. Fifty two protesters in the park were arrested. Among the arrested was Georgia state Senator Vincent Fort, who said of Reed, "He's using all these resources. ... This is the most peaceful place in Georgia."

During the day of Tuesday October 25, "An Associated Press reporter talked to [a] man with the gun slung across his back ... as he walked in the park. He wouldn't give his name, but said he was an out-of-work accountant who doesn't agree with the protesters' views, but was there, armed, because he wanted to protect the rights of people to protest. There's no law that prevents him from carrying the weapon in public, but several police followed him for about 10 minutes before moving off." Also, a homeless shelter that housed more than 100 Occupy Atlanta protesters tested positive for tuberculosis.

=== Austin, Texas ===
Occupy Austin is an occupation and peaceful protest that began on October 6, 2011, at City Hall in Austin, Texas. It is affiliated with the Occupy Wall Street movement that began in New York City, and also with the "Occupy" protests in the United States and around the world. At the center of the occupation is the General Assembly, where the community comes out and tries to come to consensus on proposals for action.

The original intent of Occupy Austin, as with many of the other "Occupy" movements, was to denounce the role that large corporations had in promulgating the 2008 financial crisis. The protesters in Austin, as in other movements throughout the world, have described themselves as the "99 percent," a reflection of their belief that the financial system rewards the richest 1 percent at the expense of everyone else. One of the features the Occupy Austin Event had at the beginning was that the occupation began progressing with little interference from the police and the city government. The organizers and occupiers had been mainly cooperative with the police, and some of the protesters had expressed appreciation for the role that the Austin Police Department has played during the occupation.

On October 7, 2011, Occupy Austin sponsored and led a march to Bank of America Center. A few hundred people participated in this march. On October 10, 2011, a march was held to celebrate Indigenous People's Day. On October 12, 2011, the City of Austin announced that the demonstration area in front of City Hall would be closed nightly between 2 a.m. and 6 a.m., and that protesters would have to move during this time period. On October 13, 2011, at roughly 2:45 am, four protesters were arrested by Austin Police Department authorities when they refused to move as ordered.

On October 13, 2011, the Library of Congress chose Occupy Austin's main web portal for inclusion in the historic collection of Internet materials focusing on public policy topics, and commenced archiving the web portal. On October 15, 2011, a march was held to the JPMorgan Chase Tower and to the Texas State Capitol. Over 1000 people participated in the march. Some protesters closed their accounts at Chase Bank. Chase Bank allowed customers who could document that they had Chase accounts into the building singularly to close their accounts.

On October 28, the City of Austin declared in a memo that new restrictions had been approved and would begin being enforced. These included a prohibition of sleeping on the mezzanine, exhibiting unattended signs, and the operation of food tables during certain hours. On October 30 at approximately 12:30 am, 18 demonstrators at the Austin City Hall mezzanine, some of whom were forming an impromptu human chain around three food tables, were arrested on charges of criminal trespassing. Subsequently, 20 additional demonstrators were arrested for refusing to vacate the area for cleaning. As per the terms of their charges, those arrested were barred from returning to the protest area for at least two years.

Addressing the public in a press conference, Austin chief of police Art Acevedo stated "Austin is very fortunate that we have an activist community that understands that violence doesn't get you anything," but that "once you're given the criminal trespassing warning, you either comply or engage in civil disobedience. That's what 38 folks did yesterday and that's why they were arrested," reaffirming his position that "we're very kind, but we're going to do our job."

In a press release issued by the Occupy Austin General Assembly, spokesperson Jonathan Cronin asserted that "on Thursday, Chief of Police Acevedo had addressed the GA and had every opportunity to raise the proposed changes and answer questions about them. His silence about them, followed by these actions, has been taken [by many] as a provocation," and that the incident was "entirely out of character from the good faith dealings we have had with city and police officials until now. Imposing these [new restrictions] apparently without due process is unnecessary and inflammatory."

Jim Harrington, director of the Texas Civil Rights Project, issued a statement saying that "If the police couldn't handle the situation, then it would have been appropriate to bring in a mediator. It's an absurd waste of tax money to spend police time and energy to break up a pure first amendment demonstration."

On October 31, a fundraiser with live music performances was held to help cover legal expenses for those recently arrested. On November 5, demonstrators marched to Wells Fargo in observation of Bank Transfer Day.

=== Boston, Massachusetts ===
Occupy Boston was a collective of protesters that settled on September 30, 2011, in Boston, Massachusetts, on Dewey Square in the Financial District opposite the Federal Reserve Bank of Boston. It was related to the Occupy Wall Street movement that began in New York City on September 17, 2011.

On October 9, the protest hosted supporters of Tarek Mehanna, a Sudbury pharmacist, and U.S. citizen accused of supporting Al Qaeda. On October 10, 2011, the Boston demonstrators expanded their tent city onto an additional portion of the Rose Kennedy Greenway; starting around 1:20 am the following morning, 141 people were arrested by the officers of the Boston Police Special Operations Unit. Most of these cases were dismissed prior to arraignment with the agreement of the Suffolk County District Attorney's office. Tents were pitched in the following days, and by October 15 the camp itself had consisted of about 90 tents on either side of a path the protesters named, "Main Street," plus another two dozen or so tents divided up between the "Student Village" area and a strip of lawn the protesters named "Weird Street".

On November 4, 2011, a group of Occupy Boston participants protested in the lobby of the building where the Israeli Consulate of Boston is located. By November 17, 2011, a judge issued an order prohibiting the eviction of protesters from Occupy Boston. On December 7, 2011, a Boston judge rescinded the temporary restraining order, allowing Boston Mayor Thomas Menino to remove the protesters from Dewey Square. At 5:00 am on December 10, 2011, Boston police moved in and raided the Occupation of Dewey Square, with 46 people arrested.

=== Buffalo, New York ===
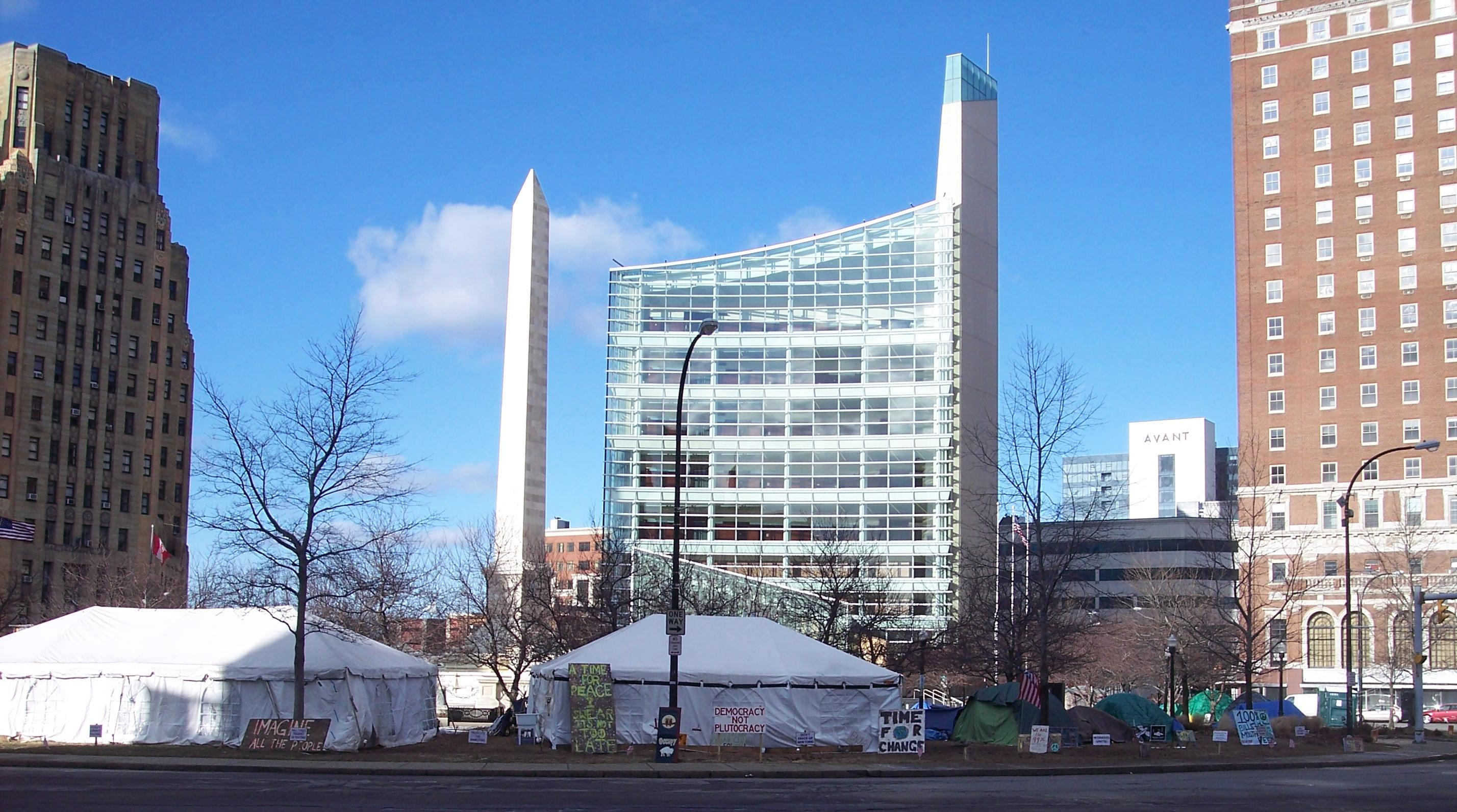
Occupy Buffalo protesters camp, Niagara Square, Buffalo, New York

Occupy Buffalo was a peaceful protest and demonstration that began on October 1, 2011, in Buffalo, New York, in Niagara Square, the nexus of downtown Buffalo opposite the Buffalo City Hall. It is related to the Occupy Wall Street movement that began in New York City on September 17.

An early target of the protest included the Steven J. Baum P.C. law firm in the Buffalo suburb of Amherst. As the largest foreclosure law firm in the state, it had been criticized by activists and fellow lawyers for its aggressive focus on foreclosure without any effort to secure modifications where homeowners or businesses might be eligible. The firm also brought about criticism from their use of questionable robo-signed documents until a change in state court rules requiring an affirmation by the lawyer or client, greatly curtailed its new filings. Baum had attracted national attention after New York Times columnist Joseph Nocera published photos taken of its employees at its 2010 Halloween party, where costumes and decor ridiculed the homeless and attacked the firm's critics. A week after Occupy Buffalo picketed Baum's offices, the firm shut down due to a loss of business after Fannie Mae and Freddie Mac forbade mortgage servicers from using the firm for foreclosure actions. As of the end of January 2012, the protest had dwindled to approximately 10 to 15 protesters daily, approximately half of which were homeless.

Compared to other cities where the Occupy movement has taken root, Occupy Buffalo's relations with the city were relatively amicable. The Occupiers and the city had a contract that allowed the Occupiers to encamp in Niagara Square, which expired January 31, 2012. During December 2011, the city allowed the installation of a 20-foot geodesic dome on the southwest portion of Niagara Square. A separate splinter group of Occupiers attempted to encamp in Lafayette Square without the city's permission; the four Occupiers were evicted from that location on December 22, 2011, with one arrest.

On February 2, 2012, city officials announced they were unable to reach a five-week extension with the Occupiers to continue, and would begin clearing the square immediately in order to prepare the square for the Winterfest, Powderkeg Festival and Labatt Blue Street Hockey Tournament scheduled for the weekend of February 11. At midnight, Buffalo Police forced demonstrators out of Niagara Square as a swat team waited on standby. Ten protesters who refused to leave were arrested for trespassing and disorderly conduct. The disorderly conduct charges were later dropped pending conditional terms.

=== Charlottesville, Virginia ===
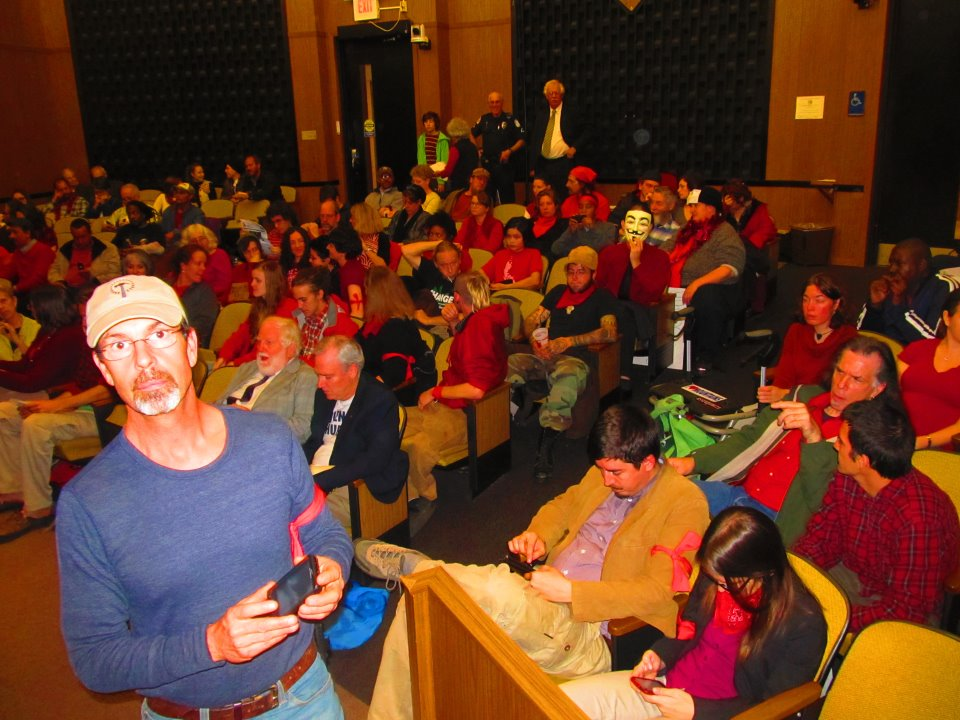
Occupy Charlottesville packs Charlottesville City Council chambers in what Councilor David Brown says is the best-attended meeting in his 8 years serving. Supporters wear red and almost 60 people ask the council to allow the encampment. A handful of those who speak on the issue ask for the council to start enforcing the 11 p.m. curfew in Lee Park.

Occupy Charlottesville is a social movement in Charlottesville, Virginia, that began on October 15, 2011, in solidarity with Occupy Wall Street and the rest of the Occupy movement. The downtown Lee Park encampment was taken down on November 30, 2011, when 18 members of the movement were arrested and charged with trespassing. Although the group has not yet established a second campsite, they continue to meet for their General Assemblies in addition to targeted actions. The group's protests target social and economic injustice both locally and nationally. The Occupy Wall Street movement began on September 17, 2011, as a protest against economic and social injustice. Soon thereafter, autonomous satellite protests sprung up across the world, most of them in the United States. In the weeks leading up to October 15 occupation in Charlottesville, protesters first met at Random Row books on October 5 and again on October 12, for the first Official General Assembly Among other topics, "they discussed and developed a set of shared values for community members, including social and economic justice, mutual respect, cooperation and non-violence with each other"

Several meetings that occurred in the first half of October lead up to Occupy Charlottesville's first action, which was a march from McGuffey Park (a few blocks away from the group's eventual campsite) to protest at a luncheon for the University of Virginia's corporate sponsors, hosted by UVa President Teresa A. Sullivan. Later that night, the campsite was established in Lee Park. This physical presence lasted until the Charlottesville Police Department broke the encampment on November 30, 2011. The group remains active and continues to organize actions, as well as joining long-existing groups in actions of their own. Charlottesville City Officials granted the group a three-day overnight permit on October 18, 2011. On October 26, the City Parks and Recreation Director, Brian Daly, granted the protesters an automatic permit renewal for the next 30 days, provided no problems arose. On November 1, three homeless men were arrested in Lee Park for various alcohol infractions, while two underage girls were taken to the hospital with "signs of alcohol consumption". Charlottesville Police Lt. Ronnie Roberts reports the men were "some of [their] area homeless that [they're] pretty familiar with", and that the men were "not with Occupy Charlottesville". After the incident, City Spokesman Rick Barrick was said "To date we have had nothing but cooperation from those in Lee Park who identify themselves as being part of Occupy Charlottesville,".

Some members of the community, notably Carol Thorpe, of the Jefferson Area Tea Party called for an end to the encampment. Charlottesville City Council expressed no intention of disbanding the encampment before the permit expired on Thanksgiving Day. City Councilor Kristin Szakos expressed her belief "that it's a First Amendment issue ... And I think the First Amendment isn't limited to certain times of the day', while then-Mayor Dave Norris proposed "a community discussion about turning a neighborhood park into a "24/7 free-speech zone."

On November 21, 2011, members of Occupy Charlottesville expressed their intention to continue their occupation to Charlottesville City Council. Many asked for the City to suspend the 11 p.m. curfew. Over 100 supporters packed the chambers in what Councilor David Brown called the best-attended meeting in his 8 years on the board. An overflow room was opened for people who could not fit in council chambers. About 60 people spoke to City Council regarding Occupy Charlottesville, a handful of them against its continued presence. Councilor response followed the public comments portion of the meeting. During this response portion of the meeting Councilor Szakos stated that she "[thinks] that free speech doesn't expire at 11 o'clock. It doesn't expire at Thanksgiving." Szakos was the sole councilor in favor of allowing the occupation to continue in Lee Park despite complaints by some members of the neighborhood. The rest of the council was in favor of the continuation of Occupy Charlottesville, albeit not in Lee Park. A desire was expressed to move the occupation to a new location, approved by the local city government. Mayor Dave Norris expressed his desire to find an alternative location for the occupiers other than a "neighborhood park". Although he expressed general support for the movement, he was resolved to end the Lee Park encampment. "I guess for me, the question is, is the movement stronger than this park? I think it is. I think it's clear that it is".

City Spokesmen Ric Barrick sent out an email saying that Occupy Charlottesville would continue to receive 3-day permits for Lee Park until a suitable alternative location was found, and that no end date had been set for the city's thus-far tolerant stance toward the occupation. Despite the enthusiasm for the movement expressed at the November 21 City Council meeting an alternative location was not determined. City government opted to evict the protesters on November 30, 2011. After the 11:00 curfew came into effect, over 20 police officers moved in. Occupy supporters packed the sidewalk, City Council member Kristin Szakos among them. Eighteen arrests were made, sixteen of the arrestees were taken to the Albemarle-Charlottesville Regional Jail while the other two were issued summons. One protester, Veronica Fitzhugh, was given an indecent exposure charge in addition to trespassing. The next night, occupiers met at the city's "Free Speech Wall", which had notices posted on it that camping would not be allowed. Mayor Norris expressed displeasure with the spectacle, calling it the "death knell" for the group. "The decision they made on Tuesday night ... a majority of them agreed to work with the city on finding another venue, but obviously a significant number decided to poke the city in the eye on the way out of Lee Park and provoke a confrontation with the city."

Szakos was displeased that the city opted to evict the protesters. "I personally, as a councilor, feel very strongly that this is part of the speech that should be protected by the Constitution," Szakos said. "And I personally disagree with us ordering them out." Despite the enthusiasm for the movement expressed at the November 21 City Council meeting an alternative location was not determined. City government opted to evict the protesters on November 30, 2011. On December 15, 2011, a single male protester was cited for impeding traffic during a march to commemorate two months since the inception of the occupation. Lt. Ronnie Roberts, of the CPD said the group was large enough to block rush hour traffic on West Main Street.

On January 27, the Charlottesville General District Court found 17 of the 18 protesters who were arrested in November guilty of a Class 4 misdemeanor for trespassing. Each of the convicted protesters must pay a $100 fine plus court costs. The 18th protester, Mario Brown had pled guilty and been sentenced to community service in December. Veronica Fitzhugh, who stripped naked to read a statement during the eviction, had her indecent exposure charge dismissed, as the court considered her actions to be "political, rather than sexual in nature". Jeff Fogel, a National Lawyers Guild attorney who represented Occupy Charlottesville was dissatisfied with the verdict. He said ..."The Supreme Court has been clear that politics should play no role in determining who gets the right to speak and not to speak on the streets of our city."

Two members of Occupy Charlottesville, Bailee Hampton and Shelly Stern filed brutality complaints against the Charlottesville Police Department based on claims of police misconduct during their November 30 arrests. A police brutality probe was conducted by the CPD but they declined to release the results. Dave Norris, who was mayor when Occupy Charlottesville was evicted, said the current policy of the CPD is that they don't release information about disciplinary action. He added that think "it would probably serve the community well to at least provide some transparency in terms of the actions that may have taken place." However, Satyendra Huja, who had taken over Norris' job as Mayor by the time the police brutality investigation was complete, felt that it was unnecessary for the police to release the results of their probe. He felt that since the Charlottesville Police Department did not take any action against its officers, the brutality complaints were baseless.

=== Chicago, Illinois ===
Occupy Chicago is a peaceful protest and demonstration against economic inequality, corporate greed and the influence of corporations and lobbyists on government which has been taking place in Chicago since September 24, 2011. The protests began in solidarity with the Occupy Wall Street protests in New York. On October 10, protesters from Occupy Chicago joined with members of the "Stand Up Chicago" coalition and marched through downtown Chicago, with numbers estimated at around 3,000.

Occupy Chicago has been consistently occupying the corners of Jackson and LaSalle in Chicago's financial district. Occupy Chicago remains unique among the major occupations across the country in that it lacks a permanent encampment. Protesters remain outdoors, exposed to the elements 24 hours a day. Due to city ordinances, protesters were told that all supplies had to be technically "mobile." Protesters complied with the city by containing all of the occupation's supplies (including signs, food, and clothing) in carts on the sidewalk. It also has created a more fluid atmosphere at Occupy Chicago with individual protesters fluctuating in and out. Occupy Chicago is also unique in that unlike Occupy Wall Street it is positioned directly in front of major financial centers, including the Board of Trade, Bank of America, and the Federal Reserve Building. This proximity has resulted in the curious sight of traders watching the protesters while outside on breaks. It has also resulted in taunts from workers in the Board of Trade. On October 4, 2011, a sign was visible in the windows of the Board of Trade that read, "WE ARE THE 1%." The sign was quickly taken down.

Seeking to create a permanent, sheltered base, over 175 protesters were arrested under the orders of Chicago's mayor Rahm Emanuel on the morning of October 16 after refusing to take down tents and remaining in Grant Park near Chicago's lakefront after the park's posted closing hours. Remaining in any unfenced park between 11 p.m. and 4 a.m. or erecting a tent or other structure without a permit is a crime according to the Municipal Code of Chicago (MCC) and park district ordinances. One week later, during a second attempt at occupation during the evening of October 22 and morning of October 23, Chicago police arrested 130 demonstrators, again for refusing to leave the park after the posted closing hours. Two of those arrested were nurses and members of National Nurses United who had set up a medical tent to provide any needed medical services to the occupation.

On October 27, 2011, Occupy Chicago planned a candlelight vigil in solidarity with Scott Olsen and Occupy Oakland. The 30 protesters were met with Chicago Police Department officers and Illinois State Troopers on order from governor Pat Quinn armed with tear gas masks, attack dogs, and police wagons. In a move to bolster law enforcement of the Occupy movement and upcoming G8 and NATO summits, in Chicago, Mayor Rahm Emanuel's recently passed ordinance imposes harsher fines and rules for protests and demonstrations. A letter sent by Occupy Chicago to 50 of Chicago's aldermen reads: "Given what the ordinance actually says, it cannot be construed as an effort to protect the integrity of G8 and NATO conferences. This measure is a permanent attack on public protest in the City of Chicago. The consequences of this attack will be far reaching, and will be felt by protesters throughout the city, most of whom will never have any connection to the protests associated with these events." Occupy Chicago divides work up between various committees which function independently. The idea of the committees is to identify individuals who have specific talents and facilitate them working together to support Occupy Chicago in smaller more focused groups.

=== Cincinnati, Ohio ===
Occupy Cincinnati was an ongoing peaceful protest and demonstration in Cincinnati, Ohio. The protest began as a march from Lytle Park in Downtown Cincinnati to Fountain Square on October 8, 2011. Protesters successfully applied for a permit to use Fountain Square until 1:00 am on October 9. Six protesters stayed in the park after the 1:00 am permit time and after the 3:00 am closing of the park. No arrests or citations were issued that night. When the park reopened at 6:00 am dozens of protesters watching from the sidewalk returned to the square. The protesters began using Piatt Park as the occupation site in Cincinnati after the first night. Each night except one that the protesters stayed in Piatt Park after the 10:00 pm closing the protesters each received a $105 fine. By October 21, the total amount given in fines reached $22,618.

Occupy Cincinnati received another permit to utilize Fountain Square on Saturday, October 22, even getting an extension to stay in the park until the 3:00 am closing time Sunday morning. Eleven protesters refused to leave the park after the closing time, and were arrested for a third night in a row. Occupy Cincinnati began to fight the citations and arrests on the base of Constitutional 1st Amendment right of Freedom of Speech and Freedom of Assembly in the City Courts on October 15. Occupiers that day were contacted by Jesse Jackson who came down to Piatt Park at 5:45 pm to speak to the protesters as they reoccupied the park.

As of April 2012, Occupy Cincinnati had continued to engage in organized meetings, events and actions.

=== Cleveland, Ohio ===
Occupy Cleveland began on October 6, 2011, with a rally at the Free Stamp before setting up tents in Public Square in Cleveland, Ohio. The nonviolent protests and occupation continued until October 21, 2011, when the Cleveland Police Department arrested eleven protesters and the camp was dismantled. The eleven arrested protesters were released the following day. Thereafter, the public presence of the group consisted of one "info tent" on Public Square, which was dismantled by the city of Cleveland on May 2, 2012, after refusing to renew the group's permit. After October 21, 2011, Occupy Cleveland became increasingly focused on the foreclosure crisis, camping in the yard of people who were going to be evicted and disrupting a sheriff's auction of foreclosed homes.

On the night of April 30, 2012, five participants of Occupy Cleveland were arrested by the FBI on terrorism-related charges stemming from an attempt to detonate explosives at a bridge in the Cleveland area. The five arrested became known as the Cleveland 4, after the fifth began to cooperate with the federal prosecution. In response to the arrests, Occupy Cleveland cancelled the May Day events that had been planned for the following day and denounced the five men.

=== Dallas, Texas ===
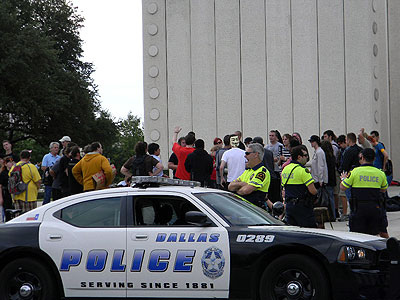
Protesters and police during Occupy Dallas

Occupy Dallas is a peaceful protest, demonstration and occupation that began on October 6, 2011, with a march to the Federal Reserve Building in Dallas, Texas. It is affiliated with the Occupy Wall Street movement that began in New York City, and also with the "Occupy" protests that have been springing up around the United States and around the world. A series of meetings that were titled "The General Assembly" or "GA" were held to plan the beginning of the event on October 6, 2011, and have been held on an ongoing basis to create a consensus on policies and planning for the occupation. Committees known as "working groups" have been formulated to utilize the expertise of volunteers who wish to assist in the event.

Occupy Dallas's aims are to non-violently reclaim control of the government from the financial interests that have corrupted them, and demands that public servants recognize that the people are the supreme authority. The intent of Occupy Dallas, as with many of the other "Occupy" movements, has been to denounce the role that large corporations have in the American legislative system. The protesters in Dallas, as in other movements throughout the world, have described themselves as the "99 percent," a reflection of the belief that the financial system rewards the richest 1 percent at the expense of the majority of the population. On October 6, 2011, Occupy Dallas marched from Pike Park to the Dallas Federal Reserve Branch.

On October 11, SMU economics professor Ravi Batra wrote an article stating that the Occupy Wall Street movement heralds the end of "crony capitalism". He argues that government policies since the Reagan Administration have greatly contributed to increase inequalities and economic problems in the U.S. and that the OWS movement should push for their repeal. On October 15, 2011, over 350 people attended a solidarity march that was coordinated with all the other Occupy movements across the world.

Roughly 150 protesters remain camped at City Hall Park for several days. Originally camped at Pioneer Plaza, protesters agreed to move to City Hall Park as a settlement with the city of Dallas. Late at night on November 17, the Dallas Police Department has raided the encampment of "Occupy Dallas" after several participants broke the city's rules for safer protest movements.

As of December 2012, Occupy Dallas had continued to engage in organized meetings, events and actions.

=== Eugene, Oregon ===
Occupy Eugene is an ongoing peaceful protest and demonstration in Eugene, Oregon. Protesters are concerned about fairness issues regarding wealth-distribution, banking regulation, housing issues and corporate greed. The first protest march was held on October 15. The march started at the Wayne Morse Free Speech Plaza and continued downtown before marching over fairy street bridge. It was reported that close to 2000 people were in attendance from all over the state of Oregon. Occupy Eugene continues to hold regular protests and actions. Protesters have stated that they do not have a set group of leaders. Occupy Eugene meets on Tuesdays at 7 and Saturdays at 4 for their General Assembly, and Mondays at 7 for the weekly coordination meeting. Decisions are made through a process known as consensus. Occupy Eugene's consensus process operates in a similar fashion to how consensus is being handled in New York City by protesters involved in Occupy Wall Street. Although the exact method varies from Occupation to Occupation. As of October 18, 2011, The Eugene police department is allowing protesters to camp in downtown Eugene, although city law prohibits it. Eugene police also stated that downtown camping won't be permanently allowed.

Occupy Eugene's first location was downtown in an area known as the park blocks on the corner of 8th and Oak. It began in mid October 2011. According to a post on the Occupy Eugene Facebook page, the community was invited to march with the Occupiers to a new location after protesters conferred with Eugene's city manager and chief of police and settled upon Alton Baker Park.

On Thursday, October 27, Occupy Eugene occupied the quad at the University of Oregon for half a day before moving their encampment to Riverfront Research Park, also known as Millrace Park, across Franklin Boulevard from the University, where they remained until Friday, November 4. On November 4, Occupy Eugene relocated their camp to Washington Jefferson Park between 6th and 7th Avenues.

On December 27, the last remaining occupant left the camp at Washington Jefferson Park. The movement continues with a new goal: to proliferate free and open urban communes for their own sake. At the Occupy camp, the fourth major one in Eugene since 2011, fifteen people live for free in tents on public display near downtown as of November 1, 2014. They encourage others to join, and hope to grow their movement to turn urban open spaces into communes, with or without government permission, all around the world.

=== Houston, Texas ===
Occupy Houston is an ongoing occupation protest that stands in solidarity with Occupy Wall Street. The planned occupation officially started in Houston, Texas, on Thursday October 6, 2011, when protesters returned from JP Morgan Chase Tower to establish an encampment at Hermann Square Plaza. During the JPMorgan Chase demonstration there were not any confrontations with the police and numerous different passerby were reported to have sympathized with the tone of the protesters. That same night the police were reported to have commented on how well behaved the protesters were.

It wasn't long before Occupy Houston moved for the first time. During the first week of the occupation Occupy Houston respectfully volunteered to evacuate the park for the Bayou City Art Festival earning Occupy Houston the nickname of "The Nicest Protesters in the World", and "Affable Protesters" by Culture Map. A few of the artists participating in the Art Festival sympathized with Occupy Houston. The location Occupy Houston moved to was Eleanor Tinsley Park where the demonstrators roughed out torrential downpours before finally erecting tents. Shortly after the rain ended, HPD ordered Occupy Houston to dismantle the tents and Occupy Houston after holding an emergency GA, for an extended period of time, eventually complied. Though not requested by HPD, the free standing, temporary, open air pavilions were dismantled as well. Prior to moving to Eleanor Tinsley, Occupy Houston vowed to return to City Hall and they did. Yet after spending a few days at City Hall the encampment was moved one last time to Tranquility Park—this time the pressing issue forcing the move was the Energy Day festival in Houston which has Hermann Square rented.

Involved people held a Corporate House of Horrors during Halloween. Another notable event that Occupy Houston organized was a Bank Transfer Day divestment march on November 4, 2011. Bank Transfer Day was a national campaign to divest from banks and to bring the financial business to credit unions which are seen as being more community-friendly. Members of Occupy Houston marched on four different banks including Bank of America, JPMorgan Chase, Wells Fargo, and Amegy to divest and close their accounts. In Texas, 47,000 credit union accounts were opened in the month of November—many of those new accounts have been attributed to the Occupy protests in Texas. The Official Planning for Occupy Houston started a week before the first protest.

Occupy Houston has found amazing support from the residents in the city. It was reported that a 42 inch flat screen TV was donated, and $1,800 collected. In addition, numerous different bands and artists have played or showed support for Occupy Houston most notably including Bun B of UGK, and the Free Radicals. A few politicians and activists have visited the occupation as well such Dick Gregory and Houston Councilwoman Jolanda Jones. The Coffee Party also airs a show live from Occupy Houston once a week. Not all members of the city have been supportive of the protest though: Houston mayor Annise Parker denied a request to supply city electricity to the occupation or to provide a statement to refuse the enforcement of the civility statute that prohibits tents in city parks. Other Occupy communities have cited Occupy Houston as an example for the good organizational work. It was mentioned at Occupy San Diego that, "[Occupy Houston] just passed a proposal and action for a de-investment campaign. What are we doing with our GA? Let's get back on track, guys."

With the number of protesters decreasing, Mayor Annise Parker requested that they move off the tax supported land and have some sort of "End Game."

=== Las Vegas, Nevada ===
Occupy Las Vegas (abbreviated OLV) is an occupation. The original intent of Occupy Las Vegas, as with many of the other "Occupy" movements, was to denounce the role that large corporations had in promulgating the 2008 financial crisis. The protesters in Las Vegas, as in other movements throughout the world, have described themselves as the "99 percent." This statement comes from the fact that 1% of the population owns 44% of the wealth in the United States. One of the features the Occupy Las Vegas Event had at the beginning was that the occupation began progressing with little interference from the police and the city government. The organizers and occupiers had been mainly cooperative with the police, and some of the protesters had expressed appreciation for the role that the Las Vegas Metropolitan Police Department has played during the occupation.

On November 3, a literal midnight meeting was held at "Area 99" which purported to create a 501(c)3 non-profit corporation named Opportunities Las Vegas, and reduced the rules for voting in the General Assembly to a simple majority. On November 5, a member of the non-profit Board of Directors stated that because of differences of opinion amongst the group that he would refuse to recognize the General Assembly's authority to in any way affect the rules of the Non-Profit due to the legal requirements and ramifications of administrating a Non-Profit.

There was a theft of passwords off an unprotected computer, in which the passwords for the Go Daddy domain name OccupyLasVegas.org, was briefly pointed to an anti-Semitic hate site by an unknown party. In the aftermath of this incident, the owner of the server where the site data was stored obtained a new URL, OccupyLV.org on his own initiative. When the original domain was restored a new hosted site was attached to it, on the initiative of the domain name owner. As of November 20, the two sides agreed on little, except that they were now separate organizations, both claiming to be "Occupy Las Vegas.".

On October 6, 2011, Occupy Las Vegas sponsored and led a march on the Las Vegas Strip. It was estimated that 1000 people participated in this march. On October 15, 2011, a march was held in the Fremont Street Experience. Over 1000 people participated in the march.

On October 21, 2011, the group began occupying a 2.5-acre site near UNLV, formerly used as an overflow parking lot by the nearby airport. The group planned a zombie walk for Halloween.

Members of both factions of OLV came together to assist a small business on the verge of being foreclosed upon, on November 13–14, 2011. In conjunction with a call by Occupy Wall Street for a protest on November 17, members of the Occupy Las Vegas factions organized a protest at the Lloyd George Federal Building. Protesters occupied the northbound lanes of Las Vegas Boulevard, resulting in 21 arrests. The arrests are a first among Occupy Las Vegas demonstrations.

=== Los Angeles, California ===
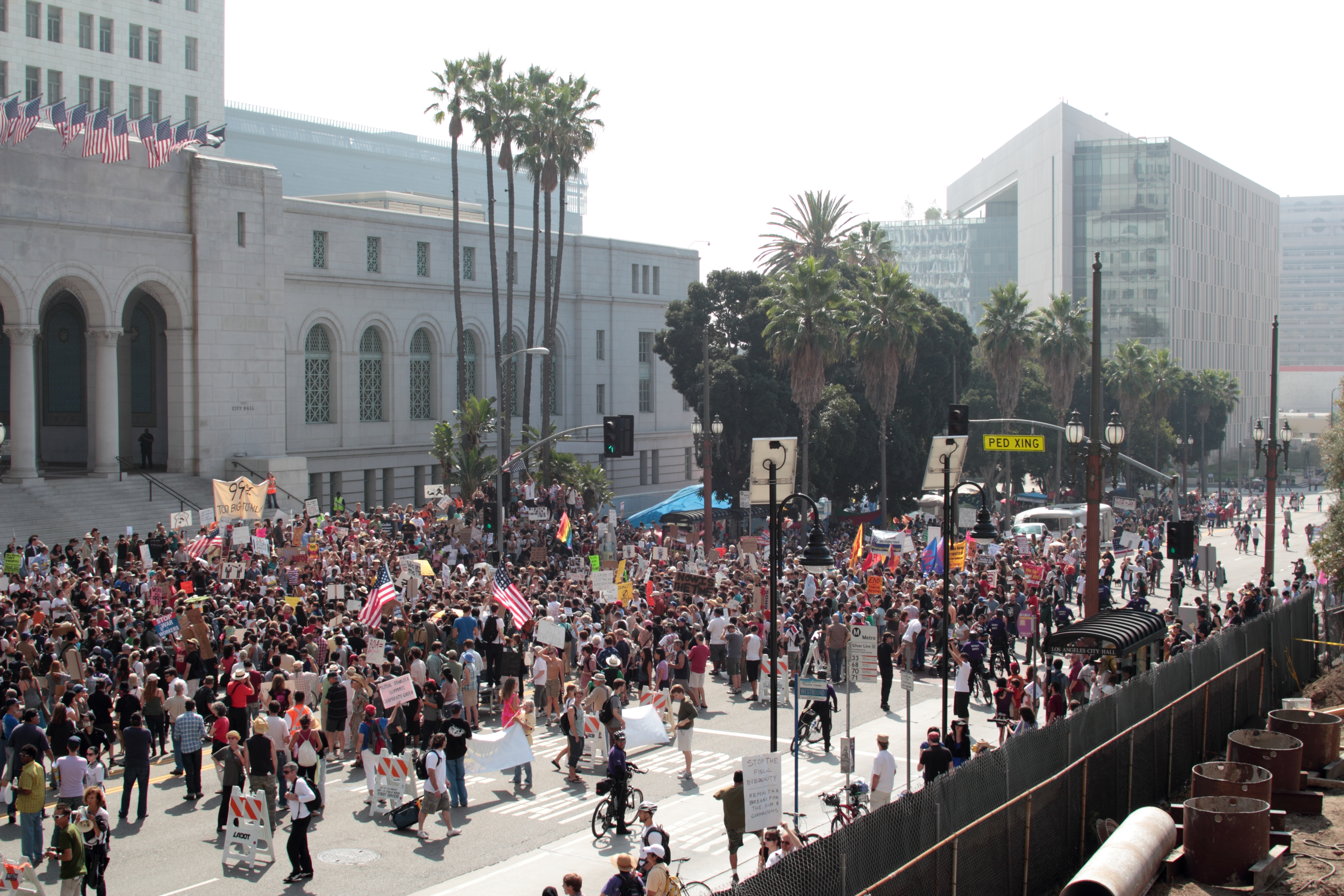
Occupy Los Angeles participants at City Hall in Downtown Los Angeles, California

Occupy Los Angeles (also referred to as Occupy L.A.) first manifested on October 1, 2011, on the grounds of Los Angeles City Hall following the original Occupy Wall Street protest. The camp experienced a relatively uncontentious relationship through its duration. On November 17, Occupy Los Angeles joined with a permitted organized labor march through downtown Los Angeles. The parade was generally orderly, though a circle of about twenty protesters surrounded three tents in the middle of a street in deliberate disobedience and were arrested. Later in the day, an unpermitted march went to a plaza at the base of the Bank of America tower, when police brought the march to a halt. More protesters were arrested for trespassing, 73 total for the day. Occupy is a social movement, not a political party, concerned with bringing equality back to the American system and then the world. The movement had several celebrity appearances including NOFX, Jesse Jackson, Bill Maher, Shepard Fairey, Tom Morello (from Rage Against the Machine) and Jeff Ross. Antonio Villaraigosa, mayor of Los Angeles, announced an eviction order deadline of Monday morning, November 28, at 12:01 a.m., giving the reason that "It is time to close the park and repair the grounds so that we can restore public access to the park."

Early Monday morning protesters and the encampment remained after the city ordered an end their protest. Four people were arrested for unlawful assembly. On Tuesday, November 29, 1,350 police raided Occupy Los Angeles. Five hundred armed police officers quickly entered the park out of City Hall doors. At 12:30 a.m. LAPD declared the Occupy L.A. site an unlawful assembly, and told demonstrators they had 10 minutes to clear the area or be arrested. A total of 292 people were arrested. Patrick Meighan, writer for the Fox animated sitcom Family Guy, was one of the 292 arrests made on November 29. He posted an account of his arrest. He also participated in an eight-part YouTube interview chronicling, in more detail, his experience the night of the raid. Patrick Meighan's account alleges police destruction of personal property, use of excessive force, and use of force to produce reactions that then were cited as resistance for justification of further use of force. Police destroyed tents providing shelter or medical service, which news outlets reported as garbage left behind by protesters. The officer who arrested Meighan had forced him into a painful wrist lock; when Meighan recoiled, he was thrown to the ground on his face, and then had his face ground into the pavement until he bled. In Meighan's report, he also alleges that police set high bail and then refused to accept payment of the bail or allow access to legal counsel. In his interview, he mentions a unique Los Angeles law that allegedly allows jailers to refuse bail, or refuse to process bail, at their own discretion.

=== Nashville, Tennessee ===
Occupy Nashville is an ongoing demonstration and occupation located at Legislative Plaza in Nashville, Tennessee. Special legislation attempting to oust the Occupy Nashville demonstration passed the Tennessee House of Representatives and Tennessee Senate in February 2012. On October 27 Governor Bill Haslam signed an executive order enacting a curfew at the state capitol. In the early morning hours of October 28, 29 protesters were arrested when they refused to comply with the order, and on the following day, 26 were arrested. In both cases, the arrests were thrown out by General Sessions Night Court Commissioner Tom Nelson, who argued the state had no authority to set a curfew for Legislative Plaza. Haslam stated the curfew was necessary due to deteriorating sanitary conditions and safety issues on the Plaza, though critics have stated that the curfew is a violation of the protesters' civil rights.

On October 29, 2011, a reporter covering Occupy Nashville for the Nashville Scene was arrested with demonstrators for violating the executive-ordered curfew despite identifying himself as a member of the press. The American Civil Liberties Union filed a lawsuit in federal court on October 31 to halt the arrests. On November 17, U.S. District Court Judge Aleta Trauger signed an injunction barring the state from enforcing the curfew on Legislative Plaza until the court could decide whether the curfew violates protesters' constitutional rights or not. A decision is not expected until February.

=== Philadelphia, Pennsylvania ===
Occupy Philadelphia is an ongoing non-violent demonstration with an aim to overcome economic inequality, corporate greed and the influence of corporations and lobbyists on government. The protest has taken place at Dilworth Plaza, which is adjacent to Philadelphia's City Hall.

=== Pittsburgh, Pennsylvania ===
Occupy Pittsburgh is a peaceful protest and demonstration with an aim to overcome economic inequality, corporate greed and the influence of corporations and lobbyists on government. The protest has taken place at several locations in Pittsburgh, notably Market Square, Mellon Green and the city's Oakland neighborhood adjacent to the University of Pittsburgh and Carnegie Mellon University. and East Liberty neighborhood. The protests began on October 15, 2011 and drew as many as 4,000 people. The protests are ongoing, with an encampment at Mellon Green. Although the park is privately owned by BNY Mellon, it initially did not request protesters to vacate, the movement citing the "public space" provisions of the city code to justify their occupation. After BNY Mellon filed in court on December 12, 2011, to end the encampment, Occupy Pittsburgh members responded by serving notice to evict the corporation from Pittsburgh. On February 8, 2012, the movement peacefully left Mellon Green after a court order was issued.

=== Providence, Rhode Island ===
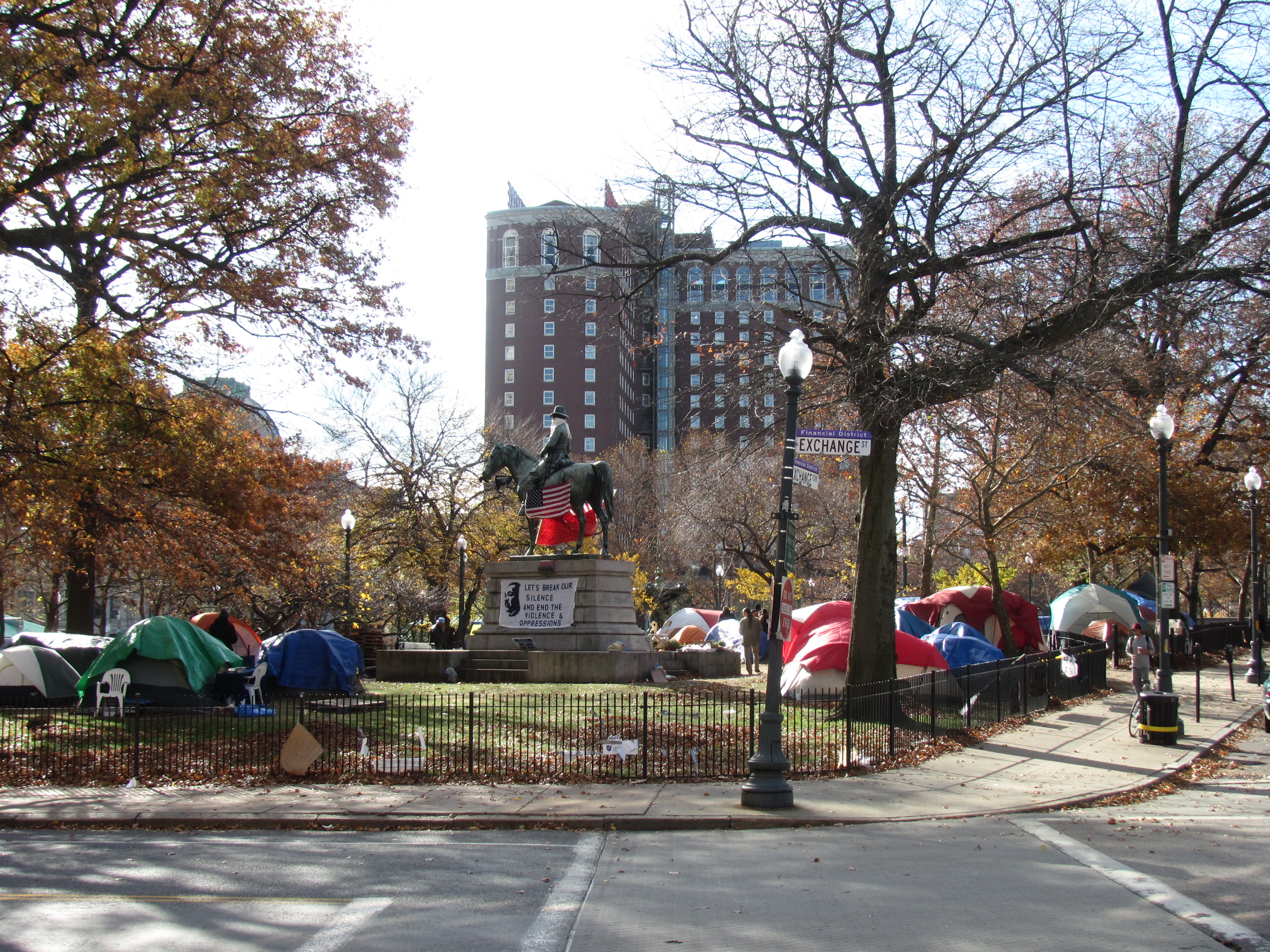
Demonstrators at Burnside Park, Providence, Rhode Island, November 19, 2011

Occupy Providence began on Saturday October 15, 2011. According to the Boston Globe, well over 1,000 demonstrators, including children and adults of various ages, peacefully marched through the capital city before setting up camp at Burnside Park in downtown Providence, RI. The march made its way through the streets of downtown Providence, pausing outside such institutions as Bank of America, Providence Place Mall, and the Statehouse. As of March 2012, Occupy Providence had continued to engage in organized meetings, events and actions.

Occupy Providence is one of over 4000 "Occupy" protests across the globe to be inspired by Occupy Wall Street (which began in New York City on September 17, 2011). According to the official Statement of Purpose as published on the Occupy Providence website on October 24, 2011, participants seek socioeconomic change "by means of a truly democratic General Assembly." The "Occupy" protests are concerned with furnishing an alternative to corporate and lobbyist-driven politics and with building "a society by, for, and of the people." Occupy Providence is "non-violent, non-destructive, non-discriminatory and harassment-free" and prohibits all drugs and alcohol from the site of the occupation. Though a group of protesters met with Providence's Public Safety Commissioner Steven Pare and other city officials on Thursday October 13, 2011, they decided to decline a city permit to inhabit Burnside Park. More than 100 tents were erected within the first week of Occupy Providence, despite some verbal pressure from city officials for a definitive exit timeline. At the outset of the demonstration, city officials showed cooperation with the Occupy participants as police cleared traffic for the October March 15 and General Assembly. No arrests or acts of violence have been reported to date.

On October 24, 2011, Occupy Providence activists staged a public reading of a letter to Providence Mayor Angel Taveras. The letter, made audible using the human microphone system, thanked the Mayor for his cooperation thus far and requested that the protest be allowed to carry on in Burnside Park. Many Occupy Providence participants that have been interviewed by the press state having no intention of leaving the park, while others are considering moving to another location. On October 26, 2011, The Boston Globe reported Steven Pare's announcement that the city will consider taking legal action if protesters refuse to end the encampment. Pare cited concern for public health and safety and an ordinance prohibiting use of public parks past 9 pm as grounds for action.

=== Rochester, New York ===
The Occupy Rochester NY encampment is located in Washington Square Park, Rochester, New York. The occupiers were initially given citations and arrested for violating park regulations. On November 10, 2011, however, they reached agreement with the city to camp in the south half of the park until mid January 2012. Note that there is also a separate Occupy Rochester MN.

=== Sacramento, California ===
On October 6, 2011, a group of 200 protesters began demonstrating at César E. Chávez Plaza, located directly in front of Sacramento City Hall, as part of the "Occupy" protests. Those in attendance began a march to the California State Capitol at 10:00 am without a proper permit to demonstrate at that location. Some arrests were made later that night. As of November 9, 2011, 84 people who may be considered part of the occupation have been arrested. Some arrests occurred after people remained in César Chávez Park after park hours and after being ordered by police to leave the park. Protesters had asked Sacramento's city council for permission to remain in the park after hours, but were denied this access. American anti-war activist Cindy Sheehan has participated in Occupy Sacramento, and was arrested on the morning of October 16, 2011, along 18 other protesters for unlawful assembly. Also during this time, people in the "Occupy Sacramento" group stated that one person whom was involved in a hunger strike was hospitalized. Occupy protesters have held marches and rallies at Sacramento's city hall in protest of being denied access to and camping at César Chávez Park after park hours.

=== Salem, Oregon ===
Occupy Salem is an ongoing peaceful protest and demonstration in Salem, Oregon. Beginning on October 10, protesters began camping out at Willson Park in Salem, and also set up tents in a parking lot adjacent to the capitol building. The encampment included a kitchen area and a first aid station. On the same day, hundreds of protesters rallied at the state Capitol. Former Salem Mayor Mike Swaim was one of the participants in this rally. On October 12, 2011, protesters were warned not to camp at a Salem park, the violation of which would result in arrests. Protesters moved their belongings and themselves out of the park, and returned the next morning. It was reported that local law enforcement considered the protest peaceful in nature. Oregon state officials on November 14 ordered the Salem protesters to leave the encampment, where they had been stationed since October 10. The officials also said that the protesters were required to "remove all tents, waste, portable toilets and other structures from Willson Park by the end of the month". In response, the protesters decided to have "daily demonstrations" at a bridge nearby the park and to also have group meetings in Marion State Park instead.

=== Salt Lake City, Utah ===
Occupy Salt Lake City began on October 6, 2011, in downtown Salt Lake City, Utah, and based in Pioneer Park. The Occupy Salt Lake City mission is to stand in solidarity with those also protesting in Wall Street, the United States, and around the world. The protest in Salt Lake City began with two demonstrations in the same day, one starting at 10 am and another at 6 pm. This protest began in front of the Utah State Capitol and marched through downtown by the financial district, passing by the office buildings of Merrill Lynch, Goldman Sachs, Wells Fargo, and the Federal Reserve. The movement in Salt Lake City began with organization meeting at the amphitheater in the downtown Salt Lake City Library with about 80–300 people in attendance. The day of the protest, the Facebook page of Occupy Salt Lake City had almost 7000 followers.

Utah public officials showed support for the protesters rights of peaceful protest and free speech, such as Congressman Jason Chaffetz and Salt Lake City Mayor Ralph Becker. The encampment was officially evicted by police on November 12 when a homeless man was found dead in his tent due to a drug overdose. City officials faced rumors recently that they would not renew the protesters city permit to camp in Pioneer park. After one of the Occupy Salt Lake City organizers receive a letter from the city, he published a post expressing concern over possible forced removal from the camp location by the city police. However, after discussions with city officials and Occupy organizers, the rumors were proved to be false. The issue was a miscommunication and was quickly resolved. The Chief of the Salt Lake Police Department commented on the issue and stated that there has never been any intention to stop protesters, and has praised Occupy SLC organizers for their great cooperation with the police and city officials. One organizer commented and hopes to avoid any civil disobedience, however, stated that disobedience will occur if protesters were forced to leave.

There have been some concern over reports about safety in amongst the protesters in Pioneer Park. One protest organizer stated that there were growing internal conflicts when it came to fights between people, sexual harassment, threats, and graffiti. Also, over the last month there was concern over whether or not the protests would get in the way of the local farmers market that is held every Saturday in Pioneer Park. The Occupy movement in Utah started to grow in October and November 2011 with a new campsite in Salt Lake City in front of the Federal Reserve Bank Building and new demonstrations appearing in the cities of Ogden and Park City.

=== San Francisco, California ===
Occupy San Francisco is located at Justin Herman Plaza in the Embarcadero and in front of the Federal Reserve building on Market Street in the Financial District in San Francisco, California. It is one of several "Occupy" protest sites in the San Francisco Bay Area. Other sites include Occupy San Jose and Occupy Oakland. On September 17, 2011, a small group of about 10 protesters set up camp in front of a Bank of America building in the Financial District. The protesters moved to Union Square for one day then relocated to the entrance to the Federal Reserve Building on September 29, 2011, where they set up tents, sleeping bags, and tarps. On October 7, 2011, the encampment consisting of tents, cooking gear, and other belongings was dismantled and taken away by the San Francisco police and city workers because it posed a public safety risk. One protester was arrested. The protesters, however, remained at the Federal Reserve site.

An additional protest site was set up at Justin Herman Plaza on the evening of October 15, 2011. The San Francisco police and city workers dismantled the camp the next evening because it was in violation of city codes. Five protesters were arrested. The camp was rebuilt the next day, on October 17, 2011. Protesters attended the San Francisco Police Commission meeting on October 19, 2011, to protest their treatment on October 15. An initially contentious meeting ended when Police Chief Greg Suhr told the protesters that he is working with Mayor Ed Lee to provide port-a-potties and hand washing stations at Justin Herman Plaza. Police raided a section of the Occupy San Francisco camp in the early hours of November 16, dismantling 15 tents which formed an overspill from the main encampment in Justin Herman Plaza and arresting seven people.

On November 16, hundreds of demonstrators, many of whom were California college students, marched through downtown San Francisco to protest the continuing tuition and fee hikes proposed and approved by the University of California Regents. Along the way, about 200 demonstrators staged a sit-in at a Bank of America branch. The bank was chosen because UC Regent Monica Lozano is on the bank's board of directors. Some demonstrators jumped on desks and wrote on the wall in chalk. One man was seen urinating in the corner. Roughly 100 demonstrators remained in the branch, set up a tent, sat down, and linked arms. 95 demonstrators were arrested for trespassing.

The main encampment at Justin Herman Plaza was dismantled following a raid at approximately 1:00 am on December 7. Seventy protesters were arrested on suspicion of illegal lodging in a public park. The site retained a police presence for several days, with signs posted stating the park was closed for renovation. Crowds swelled at the original protest site, outside the Federal Reserve building, and on December 8 it had developed into an encampment. The site continued to grow until Sunday, December 11, when police dismantled the encampment and arrested 55 protesters in the process. In January 2012, a few members of Occupy San Francisco stated they will be submitting an application with the California Department of Financial Institutions to charter a credit union. The credit union, to be named People's Reserve Credit Union, will follow the pattern of the Grameen Bank in Bangladesh with low interest rate loans being granted to those people who generally do not qualify for credit.

San Francisco Board of Supervisors member and mayoral candidate John Avalos has visited the Federal Reserve site and said of the October 7, 2011, camp dismantling: "With our unemployment rate nearing 10 percent, we have a responsibility to be a sanctuary for the 99 percent. Instead, last night we witnessed that 99 percent being detained, arrested and intimidated with force." On October 27, 2011, the police massed at the Potrero Hill substation and planned a raid, under orders from the Mayor to clean up perceived health issues. Members of the San Francisco Board of Supervisors (the legislative branch of San Francisco) stood in solidarity with the Occupy San Francisco movement, and the police canceled their raid. The first march took place on September 29, 2011. On Wednesday, October 5, 2011, hundreds of people participated in a mid-day march from the Federal Reserve protest site to Civic Center Plaza.

=== San Diego, California ===
Occupy San Diego was located at the Civic Center in downtown San Diego, California. According to authorities, it had "a growing problem with violence and mounting trash". However this assertion was disputed by protesters and eyewitnesses, since Occupy protesters have been actively cleaning the site since October 2011. On November 30, protesters clashed with police as protesters set up a voter registration table. The day before, San Diego police arrested former democratic congressional candidate Ray Lutz for setting up a similar voting registration table, Lutz cited a California Supreme Court ruling which in part states that people are allowed to register voters, even on private property. Nine protesters were arrested on December 5, 2011, including one who had to be removed from a tree. On December 12, Occupy San Diego protesters joined with other occupy movements across the west coast in an attempt to shut down the ports in San Diego. About one-hundred people showed up to the event, and four people were arrested. Three protesters were arrested on December 22 while they were in their sleeping bags, a fourth man was arrested for recording the police activity with a camera. This brought the total number of arrests related to the movement in San Diego to 139.

=== San Jose, California ===
Occupy San José is located in City Hall Plaza in San Jose, CA. The demonstration was inspired by Occupy Wall Street and is part of the larger "Occupy" protests movement. The aim of the demonstration was to begin a sustained occupation in downtown San José, the 10th largest city in the United States, to protest perceived corporate greed and social inequality, including opposing corporate influence in U.S. politics, the influence of money and corporations on democracy and a lack of legal and political repercussions for the 2008 financial crisis.

=== Seattle, Washington ===
Occupy Seattle was located at Westlake Park and Seattle City Hall in downtown Seattle, Washington. According to a news report, the City of Seattle has spent an extra $104,869 as of October 14, 2011, in response to the protest for overtime pay for police and parks & recreation personnel. Police overtime pay comprised the majority of overtime expenses at $97,200. Ten protesters were arrested for obstructing the police on the evening of October 13 after refusing to vacate Westlake Park after it had closed. On October 15, the Occupy Seattle movement had its largest demonstration to date, with over 3,000 people rallying in Westlake Park. On the morning of October 17, 2011, Seattle police informed campers at Westlake Park that tents had to be removed for city personnel to clean the park. It was reported that during this incident six demonstrators who didn't comply with the order were arrested.

The city of Seattle issued permits for Occupy Seattle on October 18, 2011, which limits camping at Westlake Park and enforces the park's closure at 10:00 pm. Another permit for protests occurring at Seattle's city hall plaza allows camping with the stipulation that tents are to be deconstructed by 7:00 am. Lawrence Lessig, a professor at Harvard Law School who has called for a Second Constitutional Convention, praised the Occupy Seattle website for having an excellent design but felt there were too many demands listed, although he agreed that the demands needed to be addressed by Congress. Lessig felt that substantive reform begins with clarity of focus in an effort to find common ground with reformers from different parts of the political spectrum: On November 2, Occupy Seattle protesters demonstrated at a Chase Bank on 12th Ave, the demonstration was a reaction to Chase CEO Jamie Dimon's visit to Seattle. At 3:00 five protesters entered the bank and linked together via chain and pieces of PVC and facing out from the tellers. In addition about a dozen demonstrators sat in front of the police van to prevent it from moving and were eventually pulled away. After being warned to leave the bank Seattle Police arrested the demonstrators. During the demonstration ten police officers were physically assaulted by protesters, one officer was struck with an empty beer bottle, two suffered minor injuries. Pepper spray was used to provide cover for the officers under attack and disperse the assailiants.

On November 15, a march commenced from the Seattle Central Community College campus to Belltown. At one point during the march a 17-year-old female swung a stick at an officer. After officers moved in to arrest the female the officers were hindered in their efforts, after issuing an order to disperse the officers deployed pepper spray to move subjects away from them so they could arrest the female suspect. Police were filmed spraying the crowd of people with pepper spray. It was reported that the victims included "a 4-foot 10-inch, 84-year-old woman, a priest and a woman, Jennifer Fox, who claimed the pepper spray led to a miscarriage." The 84-year-old woman, Dorli Rainey, is a former mayoral candidate and retired school teacher who has been active in City government on education and transportation issues since the 1960s. That night, Rainey was en route to City Hall to attend a scheduled meeting of the Seattle City Council's Transportation Committee. Rainey had served on the school board, and in the 1970s ran for a seat on King County Council. In 2009, Rainey, then 82 years old, made a brief run for Seattle Mayor before withdrawing from the race citing her age: "I am old and should learn to be old, stay home, watch TV and sit still." However, regarding the possible miscarriage by Jennifer Fox, doubts have been cast on the truth of her claim. Dorli Rainey was notably photographed as she was being carried away by friends after having been hit with the police's chemical spray.

The demonstration's goal was advertised to "disrupt Wall Street on the waterfront" and in solidarity with Truck Driver and Longshoremens unions. The Occupy Seattle movement was not well received by Maritime Unions, Robert McEllrath President of the International Longshore and Warehouse Union said "Support is one thing, organization from outside groups attempting to co-opt our struggle in order to advance a broader agenda is quite another and one that is destructive to our democratic process." However, port truckers across the nation indicated their solidarity with the day of port shut-downs, signaling their own poor working conditions. On December 10, at 1:30, an estimated 400 Occupy Seattle Demonstrators left Westlake Park along 2nd Ave as part of a larger effort to shut down West Coast ports. After reaching Terminal 18 protesters divided themselves into different zones; red, yellow, and green differentiating the likelihood of arrest. The demonstrators blocked traffic to Spokane Street in both directions. The protesters then took multiple sections of fencing and dragged it across the roadway leading to the terminal gate. There allegedly were numerous dispersal orders were given to the marchers, however police alleged demonstrators pulled more fencing into the roadway and began throwing burning flares, bags of bricks, and bags of paint, rebar and other debris at the police officers and police horses monitoring the demonstration. Eleven adults were arrested for various violations including Failure to Disperse, Obstructing and Assaulting an Officer. Nine were released on own recognizance while two were held overnight for felony assault on an officer.

=== St. Louis, Missouri ===
Occupy St. Louis (OccupySTL) began on October 1, 2011, as a protest against corporate greed, its influence over the economy, its corruption of government, and ensuing inequality. Although people possess differing viewpoints and diversity of views is a central tenet, commonly held themes seek an equal playing field in the economy with more equal opportunities for all people as well as accountability for corporate and financial malfeasance. Many of those in the movement argue that structural, systemic change is necessary and that incremental reform is insufficient and in any case not possible without popular countervailing power to the power of moneyed interests. It is located at Kiener Plaza in downtown St. Louis near an area which includes many financial institutions such as commercial banks and the Federal Reserve Bank of St. Louis. Occupy St. Louis consists of concerned citizens and individuals from many different ideologies and backgrounds whom wish to address economic and political issues. It uses consensus decision-making and is a horizontal organization utilizing facilitators in lieu of leaders and has no official spokesperson.

The encampment has consisted of more than fifty tents with a couple hundred continuous occupiers and many hundreds more activists. Several families occupied the space long term. The demographics consist of people from a large racial, gender, and political mix, many people of various ages and class backgrounds, laborers, professionals, large numbers of both employed and unemployed, the underemployed, military veterans, students and teachers, some homeless, as well as those of diverse sexual orientations.

Actions held by Occupy St. Louis include the occupation of Kiener Plaza, civil disobedience, demonstrations, protest marches, and picketing. OccupySTL has acted in solidarity with at least two strike actions and walkouts and has been supported by various trade unions and many individual unionists from the region. OccupySTL is participating in moving money from large commercial retail banks (in particular, Bank of America) to local credit unions or community oriented banks. It participated in Bank Transfer Day on November 5, 2011. It has called boycotts, supported buy local campaigns, organized mic checks and flash mobs at area stores on Black Friday, and participated in food drives. It cosponsored a "Green Friday" festival with barter trading, a fair trade market, arts and crafts workshops, live music, and roundtable discussions as a sustainable alternative to Black Friday.

A large rally and march in alliance with area unions held on October 14 attracted around 1000 people. Banners were unveiled on area overpasses. There are educational efforts such as daily teach-ins from a variety of organizations. A food tent was established to feed occupiers (as well as some of the city homeless). An on-site library of pamphlets, periodicals, and books has also operated. An interfaith was established by two chaplains, creating a space for interfaith worship, discussion, and fellowship.

Occupy St. Louis initially faced a small number of citations and arrests for violation of the curfew at Kiener Plaza, a city park. Thereafter until November 11, however, the response from the St. Louis Police Department and Mayor Francis G. Slay had been relatively less repressive than that of many other cities and there were no large scale arrests, raids, or police violence. The mayor eventually blogged and city officials indicated to the media a list of violations, which was challenged by OccupySTL, as well as an ultimatum that occupiers vacate the plaza after curfew and remove all tents. After 11 pm on Veterans Day, the St. Louis police faced a crowd of about 400 to raid the plaza, arresting approximately 27, and confiscating (with the city parks department) the materials of occupiers left on site. Although there was no rough treatment of people by the police, some of these materials were thrown into garbage trucks and crushed despite explicit assurances that all items would be bagged and tagged for later retrieval by owners. OccupySTL marched in solidarity with the Veterans Day march earlier in the day but its activists challenged pervasive neglect of veterans. Since the Veterans Days eviction, Kiener Plaza has been continuously patrolled by park rangers and the city police who have strictly enforced the ban on tents and the 10 pm-6 am curfew. A preliminary injunction filed pro bono on behalf of Occupy St. Louis to cease enforcement of the curfew by arguing violation of First Amendment speech rights was denied in the United States District Court for the Eastern District of Missouri.

=== Washington, D.C. ===
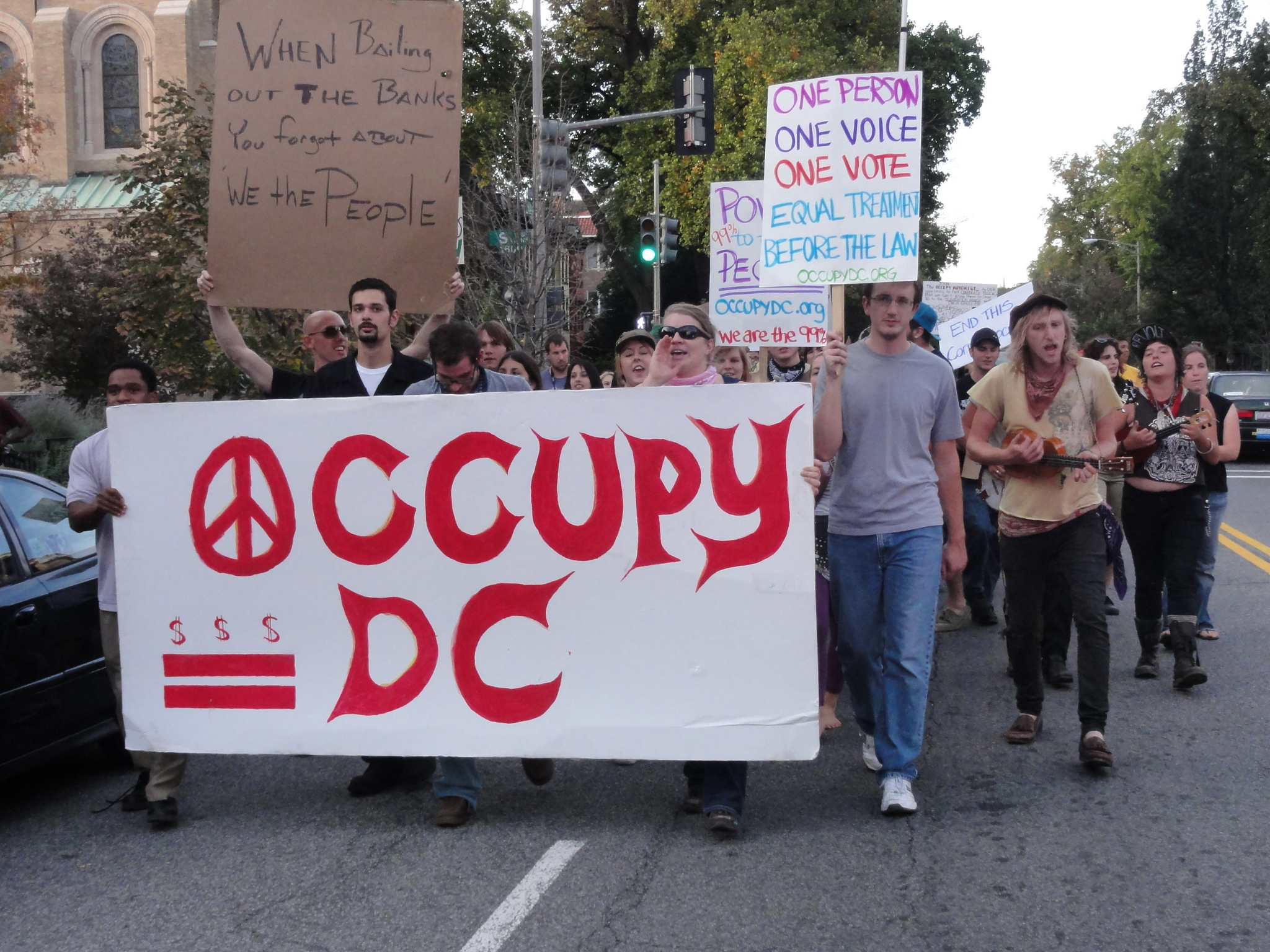
Occupy DC march of October 9, 2011

Occupy D.C. is a non-partisan occupation of public space in Washington, D.C. based at McPherson Square. The group has been demonstrating in McPherson Square since October 1, 2011, and in Freedom Plaza since October 6. Despite crackdowns on other Occupy projects across the country, federal authorities claimed on November 15 that they have no plans to clear McPherson Square Park. The National Park Service decided against eviction after meeting with activists and discussing health and safety conditions. As of January 31, the Occupiers remain in McPherson Square and Freedom Plaza, despite the National Park Service's ban, which went into effect at 12 pm on January 30, 2012. Federal judge James Boasberg heard arguments on January 31 to determine whether or not to uphold the ban.

According to occupyfreedomplaza.org , the movement contends that "money is not speech, corporations are not people, only people have Constitutional rights," demanding the shift of power from the wealthiest 1% of Americans to the underrepresented 99%. The "Declaration of Occupy D.C.", released by the General Assembly of Occupy D.C. on November 30, 2011, provides a list of the group's grievances. The rat population has "exploded" around the Occupy D.C. camps at Freedom Plaza and McPherson Square. Washington, D.C., Department of Health director Mohammad Akhter inspected the camps and said, "it's no different than refugee camps".

== Higher education ==
Occupy movements have taken place on college campuses across the United States. UC Berkeley, UC Davis, San Francisco State University, UC Irvine, City University of New York, and Occupy Harvard are some institutions of higher education that have held occupations in support of the Occupy movement.

Saint Mary's College of California held teach-ins to educate students on the Occupy movement and encourage them to get involved.

== Public opinion polls ==
An October 12–16 poll found that 67% of New York City voters agreed with the protesters and 87% believed that they had a right to protest. A national poll conducted by Public Policy Polling released on October 13, 2011, show 45% of Americans opposing the movement and 33% favoring it. A Siena poll of New York released on show of November 15s that two-thirds of New Yorkers do not believe that the movement represents "the 99%".

== Criticism ==
One critique concerns itself with the way in which the Occupy movement had focused its demands around a narrowly modern understanding of freedom that differs little from the claims of mainstream liberal pluralism:

The modern ideology of freedom ... provides its point of departure. This singular dominance of the modern becomes clear in the long list of demands that follow. Practicality dominates and there is not a single demand for relief from the ontological dominance of modern practices and subjectivities that abstract, codify, rationalize and objectify our lives. Though the ideals and demands ... are laudable, they are not that much different in form from the Millennium Goals of the United Nations.

Remarks from Occupy Wall Street participant Justine Tunney, a Google software engineer, who called on President Obama to appoint Eric Schmidt "CEO of America", have also sparked criticism, including from the vast majority of other Occupy participants, many of whom have observed that her politics are inconsistent with horizontalism.

Some Occupy Wall Street protests have included individuals using anti-zionist and antisemitic slogans or signage, such as "Jews control Wall Street" or "Zionist Jews who are running the big banks and the Federal Reserve". As a result, the Occupy movement has been confronted with accusations of antisemitism.

A 2017 book released by Brookings Institution senior fellow Richard V. Reeves called Dream Hoarders: How the American Upper Middle Class Is Leaving Everyone Else in the Dust, Why That Is a Problem, and What to Do about It, presented data which showed that:

...more than a third of the demonstrators on the May Day 'Occupy' march in 2011 had annual earnings of more than $100,000. But, rather than looking up in envy and resentment, the upper middle class would do well to look at their own position compared to those falling further and further behind.

== Impact on US Politics ==
U.S. Presidential Candidate Buddy Roemer made headlines by becoming the first candidate to vocally support the Occupy Movement. Several of the Occupy Movement demands were already in line with President Barack Obama's view, such as not outsourcing American jobs, ending tax breaks for the super-wealthy, health care for all, and filling tax loopholes that permit individuals and companies from paying their fair share of taxes. Libertarian presidential candidate Carl E. Person had also reached out to the movement.

In a 2011 interview on Fox News Sunday, Democratic Party chairperson Howard Dean stated that the occupy movement had "changed the dialogue" in terms of American politics. He remarked, "most people in this country believe now that there's 1 percent that has a lot and a 99 percent [sic] that gets treated not so well."

In April 2012, the Occupy movement in the U.S. evolved plans for the 2012 Republican National Convention in Tampa, Florida, starting August 27 and the September 3, 2012 Democratic National Convention involving Occupy Charlotte.

== IRS ==
Documents obtained by Bloomberg News showed that "occupy" was one of the terms that appeared on versions of "be-on-the-lookout" lists used by IRS employees.

== See also ==
Note: Cities with 'Occupy' articles are in the show-hide table below.

- Timeline of Occupy Wall Street
- We are the 99%

Other U.S. protests

- 2011 United States public employee protests
- 2011 Wisconsin protests

Other international protests

- 15 October 2011 global protests
- 2010–2011 Greek protests
- 2011 Chilean protests
- 2011 Israeli social justice protests
- 2011 United Kingdom anti-austerity protests and 2010 UK student protests
- Iceland Kitchenware Revolution
- Spanish 15M Indignants movement

Related articles

- Bank Transfer Day
- Corporatocracy
- Corruption Perceptions Index
- Economic inequality
- Grassroots movement
- Impact of the Arab Spring
- Income inequality in the United States
- List of countries by distribution of wealth
- List of countries by income equality
- Plutocracy
- Second Constitutional Convention of the United States
- Wealth inequality in the United States
