= Occupy Houston =

Protest group against economic inequality

- Part of the Occupy movement
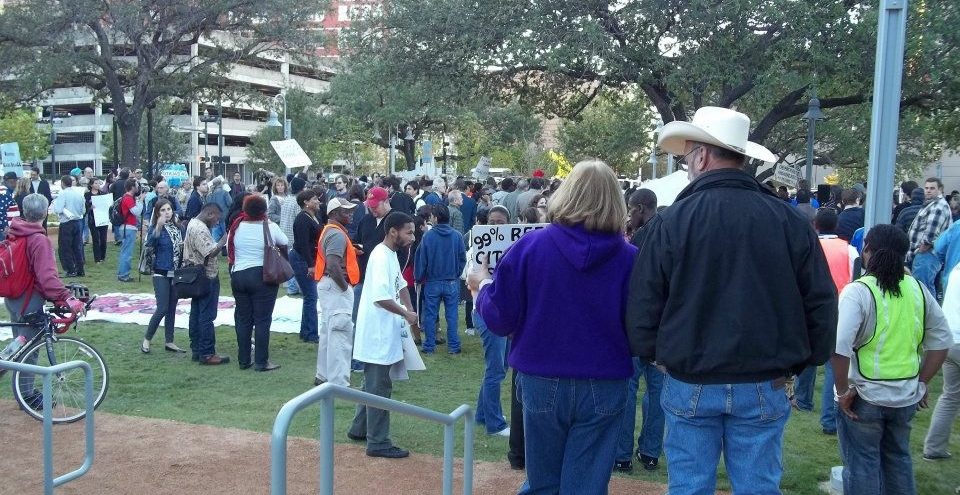
- Date: October 6, 2011 – February 14, 2012
- Location: Houston, Texas
- Caused by: Wealth inequality, Corporate influence of government, inter alia.
- Methods: Nonviolent protest; Rioting; Civil disobedience; Occupation; Picketing; Demonstrations; Internet activism
- Status: Defeated

Number
- Other activity in Houston: 200+ marchers (march on JP Morgan, October 2, 2011) 40 dancers (Zombie flash mob, October 31, 2011)

Occupy Houston is a Houston, Texas-based activist group Occupy Houston was a collaboration that has included occupation protests that stand in solidarity with Occupy Wall Street. The planned occupation officially started in Houston, Texas on Thursday October 6, 2011 when protesters returned from JP Morgan Chase Tower to establish an encampment at Hermann Square Plaza. During the JPMorgan Chase demonstration there were not any confrontations with the police and numerous different passerby were reported to have sympathized with the tone of the protesters. That same night the police were reported to have commented on how well behaved the protesters were.

As of June 2012, Occupy Houston had continued to engage in organized meetings, events and actions.

Occupy Houston is a local expression of the global movement to end the corporate corruption of our democracy

— Occupy Houston Organizers, Interview with Channel 2 KPRC

== Relocations ==
It wasn't long before Occupy Houston moved for the first time. During the first week of the occupation Occupy Houston respectfully volunteered to evacuate the park for the Bayou City Art Festival earning Occupy Houston the nickname of "The Nicest Protesters in the World", and "Affable Protesters" by Culture Map. A few of the artists participating in the Art Festival sympathized with Occupy Houston. The location Occupy Houston moved to was Eleanor Tinsley Park where the demonstrators roughed out torrential downpours before finally erecting tents. Shortly after the rain ended, HPD ordered Occupy Houston to dismantle the tents and Occupy Houston after holding an emergency GA, for an extended period of time, eventually complied. Though not requested by HPD, the free standing, temporary, open air pavilions were dismantled as well.

Prior to moving to Eleanor Tinsley, Occupy Houston vowed to return to City Hall and they did. Yet after spending a few days at City Hall the encampment was moved one last time to Tranquility Park—this time the pressing issue forcing the move was the Energy Day festival in Houston which has Hermann Square rented. Though Occupy Houston opted to acquiesce to the demands of the City by evacuating Hermann Square, it did not support the Energy Festival. Instead, Occupy Houston protested the festival on the grounds of its sponsorship by TransCanada, the company behind the Keystone XL Pipeline, and Valero which demanded a further $62.8 million tax refund. The night of the move (as with the initial move) a few remained, perhaps one or two, well into the morning in general protest. Their grievances included the renting of public space to private entities, as well as specifically the KBR display that was erected that night.

== Notable events ==
Involved people held a Corporate House of Horrors during Halloween.

Another notable event that Occupy Houston organized was a Bank Transfer Day divestment march on November 4, 2011. Bank Transfer Day was a national campaign to divest from banks and to bring the financial business to credit unions which are seen as being more community-friendly. Members of Occupy Houston marched on four different banks including Bank of America, JPMorgan Chase, Wells Fargo, and Amegy to divest and close their accounts. In Texas, 47,000 credit union accounts were opened in the month of November—many of those new accounts have been attributed to the Occupy protests in Texas.

The encampment was evicted in February 2012.

Redacted FBI files, obtained in December 2012 by the Partnership for Civil Justice Fund, show that an unnamed group was planning sniper attacks against Occupy Houston. This was first planned against individual protestors in October 2011, and then "a plan to kill the leadership".

== Planning ==
The Official Planning for Occupy Houston started a week before the first protest.

=== Teams ===
There are numerous teams working within Occupy Houston:

- A legal team consisting of 10 members of the National Lawyers Guild.
- Warehouse (Catalog communal goods check-out and check-in)
- Logistics
- Web & Media
- Facilitation (Help moderate the General Assembly)
- Sustainability
- Medical
- Food

== Support from the community ==
Occupy Houston has found amazing support from the residents in the city. It was reported that a 42-inch flat screen TV was donated, and $1,800 collected. In addition, numerous different bands and artists have played or showed support for Occupy Houston most notably including Bun B of UGK, and the Free Radicals. A few politicians and activists have visited the occupation as well such Dick Gregory and Houston Councilwoman Jolanda Jones. The Coffee Party also airs a show live from Occupy Houston once a week.

This is something that I think everybody at some point and time should be concerned about as a resident of Houston and as a citizen of the world

— Bun B, Interview with the Houston Chronicle

Not all members of the city have been supportive of the protest though: Houston mayor Annise Parker denied a request to supply city electricity to the occupation or to provide a statement to refuse the enforcement of the civility statute that prohibits tents in city parks.

Other Occupy communities have cited Occupy Houston as an example for the good organizational work. It was mentioned at Occupy San Diego that, "[Occupy Houston] just passed a proposal and action for a de-investment campaign. What are we doing with our GA? Let's get back on track, guys."

== Decreasing numbers ==
With the number of protesters decreasing, Mayor Annise Parker requested that they move off the tax supported land and have some sort of "End Game."

== See also ==
Occupy articles

- List of global Occupy protest locations
- Occupy movement
- Timeline of Occupy Wall Street
- We are the 99%

Related articles

- Income inequality in the United States
- Lobbying – the act of attempting to influence decisions made by officials in the
  government, most often legislators or members of regulatory agencies
- Plutocracy
- Tea Party protests
- Wealth inequality in the United States

Related portals:
