= DJ Sun =

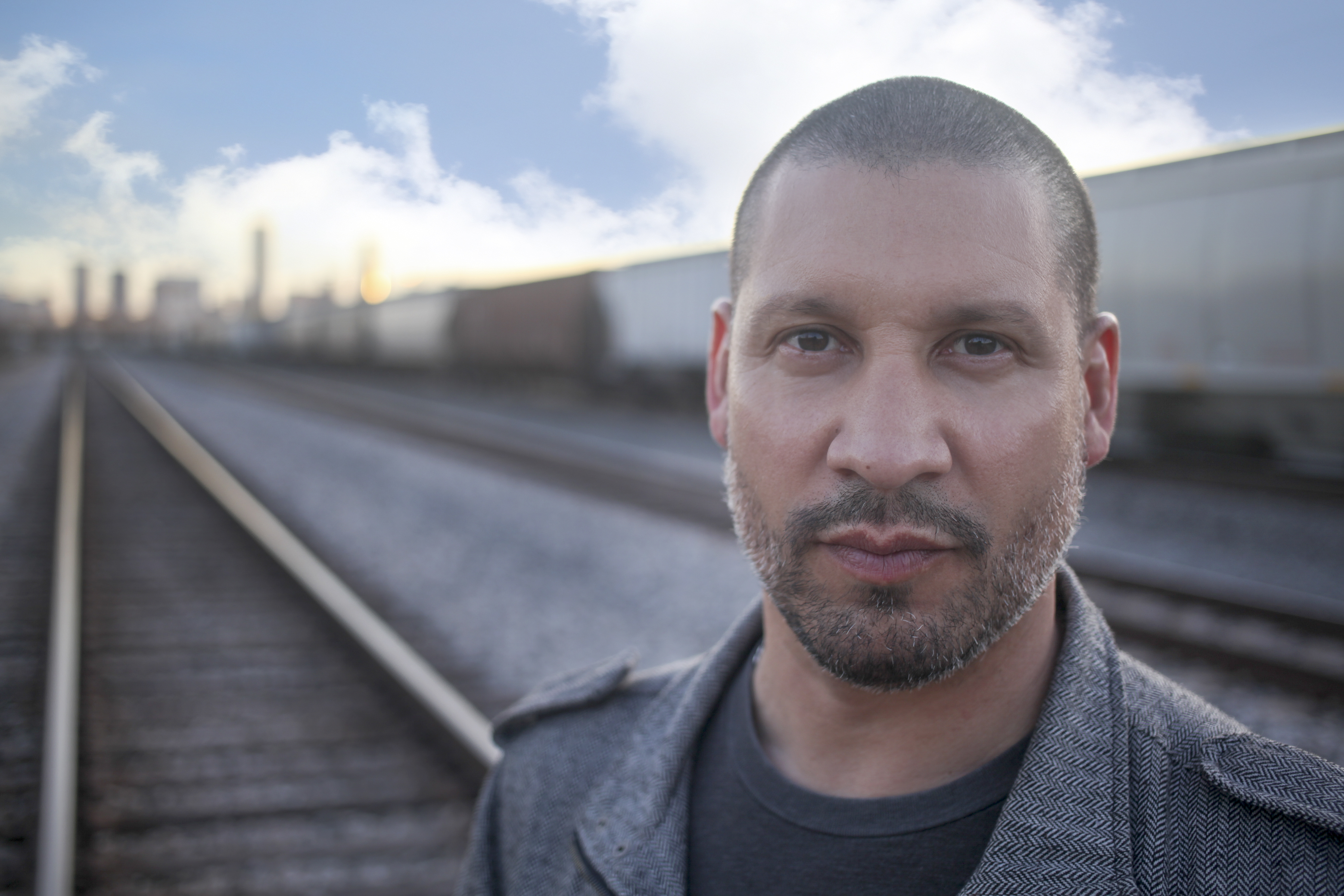

Background information
- Born: Andre J. E. Sam-Sin; Rotterdam, Netherlands
- Origin: Houston, Texas
- Genres: Electronic, downtempo, Electronica
- Occupation: Music Producer/ DJ
- Instruments: Akai MPC 1000, Akai MPC 2000, Technics Turntables, Rhodes Piano, Wurlitzer Piano, Korg Trinity, Micro Korg, Farfisa
- Years active: 1993 - present
- Labels: Alternate Take Records, Soular Productions, Freerads
- Website: http://www.djsunmusic.com/

Andre J. E. Sam-Sin (born January 19, 1966), known professionally as DJ SUN, is a Dutch-born American record producer and DJ. He is one of the most prolific musicians in Houston, having secured his position as the top-ranked DJ and as the owner/operator of the popular live music venue The Flat.

== Early life ==
DJ Sun was born in Rotterdam, the Netherlands, his mother a native New Yorker, with roots in Aruba and St. Maarten, and his father from Suriname. As a child, Sun and his family settled in Suriname until his early teens, following which they relocated to Texas.

His exposure to diversity of culture in childhood became the foundation for his music, which as a mixed-race teenager in Texas became indelibly important for his sense of identity and creativity.

Sun graduated from the University of Houston with a degree in accounting.

== Music career ==
DJ Sun's professional music career started at age 26, in Houston, Texas, and became successful rather quickly, lending to him the designation of Houston Press DJ of The Year seven times. During this time, he also started a radio show in 1995, Soular Grooves on KPFT 90.1 FM, Pacifica Network. The music played on Soular Grooves has the aesthetics of soul and jazz, irrespective of bpm or tempo. Soular Grooves was initially known as an acid jazz show.

DJ Sun's style has been described by music writers like Shea Serrano of The Houston Press weekly as varied with a distinct signature for loungey, groove-oriented eclectic music shaped by his exposure to music while living abroad.

In 2007, DJ Sun became a music producer with the release of Monday Drive (Alternate Take Records), an EP reflective of his varied background, blending styles and nostalgic aesthetics into a down to midtempo paced EP. DJ Sun released Para, a 12” EP which included remixes from DJ Sabo (Sol Selectas), J Boogie (OM) and Genre Jazz (Presto and Mhax Montes), released in November 2008.

On January 15, 2013, DJ Sun released "One Hundred", a 19-track album featuring guests Tim Ruiz (La Mafia), Leah Alvarez, Jessica Zweback, Mark Sound, Meghan Hendley, and Martin Perna. Soon after that, on October 10, 2013, DJ Sun was awarded the Best CD by a Local Musician in the annual Best Of Houston edition of The Houston Press.

In 2016, DJ Sun released his album QINGXI, a concept album culminating from an ancestral quest to China (funded by Asia Society Center Texas). It has been received favorably by reviewers such as Phil from "Phil's Picks", who referred to it as "One Of 2016’s Most Original, Creative New EDM Offerings".

In April 2018, Free Radicals released remixes by DJ Sun on their album No State Solution, a remastered and remixed collection of tracks from their past six albums.

On November 2, 2019, DJ Sun performed on stage as the opening act for Khruangbin at White Oak Music Hall in Houston. Mark Speer, from Khruangbin, during the show described DJ Sun as "a Houston music legend, a mentor and one of his oldest friends."

On Saturday July 23, 2022, DJ Sun assembled a 14-piece orchestra featuring various Houston musicians including Chris Dave on drums, and Fat Tony (rapper) and SAM/SIN (DJ Sun’s daughter and the Loveletter playwright) on vocals. The show marked the release of DJ Sun's 3rd album Loveletter. The concert was held at Moores School of Music Opera House, on the campus of The University of Houston, to a sold out venue.

On Saturday June 8, 2023, DJ Sun and Houston's Aperio Orchestra teamed up to perform Loveletter with a 25-piece orchestra conducted by Marlon Chen, with SAM/SIN returning as a featured vocalist. The event took place at Miller Outdoor Theater in Hermann Park, Houston.

== Discography ==
- Current Cuts Vol. 1 (2007)
- “Sure” (7"-single format) - Soular Productions (2007)
- “Ten” - Label-less Scion CD 11 (Scion/The Rebel Organization) (2008)
- "Monday Drive EP" (Alt Take Records) (2008)
- "Para EP" (Alt Take Records) (2009)
- "One Hundred EP" (Soular Productions) (2010)
- One Hundred (full album) (Soular Productions) (2013)
- Qingxi (full album) (Soular Productions) (2016)
- "Screaming Remix"- Free Radicals and DJ Sun (2018)
- "Loveletter" (Soular Productions) (2022)

== Awards ==
- 1999-2005, 2009, 2013: Houston Press DJ of the Year
- 2013: Best CD By A Local Musician- DJ Sun, One Hundred (Soular Productions, 2013)
- 2014 Houston Press Hall of Fame
