= Skye Drynan =

Fashion entrepreneur

- Born: Skye Yayoi Drynan; Whitefish, Montana, U.S.
- Occupation(s): Entrepreneur; Fashion designer
- Organization: House of Skye
- Labels: Bareback Intimates; Snow Beast; Dulce Bestia
- Parent: Craig Drynan (father)

Skye Yayoi Drynan is an American businesswoman and fashion designer. She is the founder and CEO of House of Skye, a modern fashion house.

== Early life ==
Skye was born in Whitefish, Montana as the daughter of Crystal Winter's founder, Craig Drynan. Her parents divorced when she was a child, and he raised her as a single parent.

== Career ==
After education, she started her career in biopharma and handled many positions during her long tenure. She was a Partner & Senior BioPharma Investment Analyst at Capital Group, Senior Analyst at Lord, Abbett & Co., Global Head of Healthcare at Credit Suisse Asset Management, and Analyst at New Vernon Associates and Putnam Investments. She is presently a member of ASAF Angels' board of directors.

After 22 years of working in biotech finance, she ventured into the field of fashion design in 2016 and founded House of Skye, an online lingerie and clothing retailer. Skye created patents to launch two new labels that combined cutting-edge technology with the latest fashion: Dulce Bestia for high-end ready-to-wear and Bareback Intimates for lingerie and loungewear. Her three major product lines are Bareback Intimates, Snow Beast, and Dulce Bestia.

Hollywood's A-List has worn her designs, including Gwen Stefani, Lady Gaga, Paris Hilton, Poppy, Maejor, Gavin Leatherwood, Brenda Song, Danna Paola, Laura Marano and others. Skye's fashion lines have been featured in music videos and on album covers for artists including Avril Lavigne, Carrie Underwood, Lexy Panterra and Ally Brooke.

She has appeared on the covers of several worldwide publications, including Harper's Bazaar, Glamour, Elle, L'Officiel, and 360 magazine. Several Bling cast members attended and participated in her 'House of Skye' runway presentation for the company's 'Phoenix Rising' collection during LA Fashion Week.

In 2022, she released her debut single Skye’s the Limit, co-produced by American drummer and record producer Nick Cooper, and Tommy Brown.

In August 2022, Drynan partnered with Clif Loftin to hold an event to showcase Drynan's new clothing line of women and men’s intimate wear with the intimates line, Bareback. The line includes a patented design for her backless, strapless bra.
