= Nick Cooper =

American drummer

- Nick Cooper playing drums with Chris Howard in the background

Background information
- Born: May 27, 1968 (age 57); New York
- Origin: Houston, Texas, United States
- Genres: Funk
- Occupations: Musician, composer, producer
- Instrument: drums
- Website: www.nickcooper.com

Nick Cooper (born May 27, 1968) is an American drummer, record producer and composer best known for his work with Free Radicals. Nick is also an activist with food not bombs, and an editor for Houston Peace News. He is also a documentary filmmaker (on the topic of somatherapy), a workshop facilitator, a student of capoeira angola, and a visual artist.

== Biography ==
Cooper was born in New York and grew up in Manhattan. He played in bands in high-school and began political activism at that time with the anti-Apartheid movement. He was an English major at Rice University in Houston, where he joined the band Sprawl.

Sprawl toured the U.S. many times, and released four CDs, breaking up in 1994. Cooper also worked with Rastaman Work Ethic productions in Houston, and produced a compilation CD, Texas Funk (1990), that included Sprawl and other bands.

In 1996, Cooper started Free Radicals. In 2000, Cooper travelled to Los Angeles to cover the protests against the Democratic National Convention. Coming soon after the 1999 protests against the WTO, many activists were converging there as was the new indymedia network.

Upon returning to Houston, Cooper began the Houston branch of indymedia with other local activists, and began travelling to work with other indymedias. In 2003 and 2005, Cooper traveled to Brazil to document somatherapy, with a DVD eventually being released in 2006. In 2004 and 2006, Cooper traveled to Chiapas to study the Zapatista movement and used the information he learned as the basis for a workshop entitled "Nazis vs. Zapatistas, Struggle and Co-optation" which he has facilitated in the United States and Latin America.

In 2010, Cooper produced the compilation CD Klezmer Musicians Against the Wall. In 2022, Cooper co-produced Skye Drynan's debut album, Skye's the Limit.
