= InsightOut News =

- InsightOut News logo from website

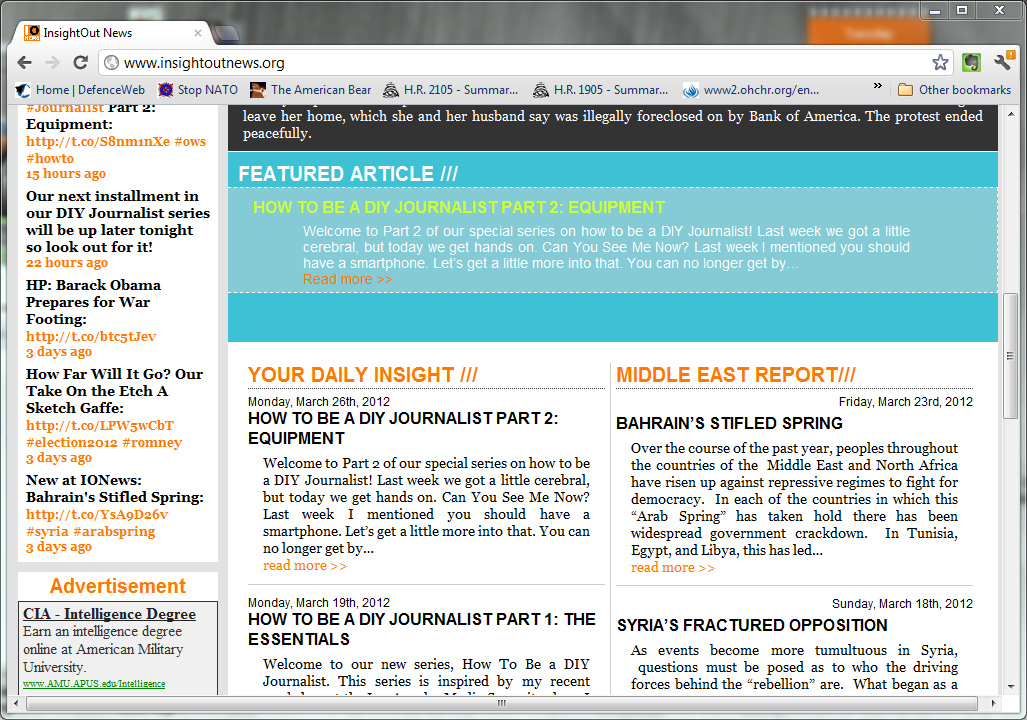
- Screenshot
- Website type: News
- Available in: English
- Owner: Margot Paez
- Website: www.insightoutnews.org
- Commercial: No
- Registration: None
- Launched: September 21, 2011; 15 years ago
- Current status: Defunct

InsightOut News was a grassroots journalism website based on the idea that news is "not entertainment nor a commodity." It grew out of covering Occupy Los Angeles and now also covers international events, particularly in the Middle East. Original content from the site is often featured by other media outlets, such as the LA Progressive and Crooks and Liars.

== Occupy Los Angeles ==
Margot Paez, the website's founder, is based in Los Angeles. Her first posts to the site were daily coverage of the Occupy L.A. protests, part of the Occupy movement that started in September 2011. This coverage included (sometimes critical) interviews with celebrity visitors like Dan Choi and Tom Morello, as well as coverage of everyday activities at the camp.

Photos and videos from InsightOut News have been picked up by other outlets such as LA Weekly.

As focus drifted away from the Occupy encampments, InsightOut modified and expanded its operations, taking on a larger scope of issues.

== Style ==
InsightOut News has been noted specifically for posting content with sparse editing (for example footage interviews with Bill Maher and Jesse Jackson). This approach is consistent with the site's philosophy of disseminating information with as much neutrality as possible.

The site also features videos of Margot Paez reporting from inside demonstrations and other chaotic situations. Paez was almost arrested during the eviction of the Occupy encampment.

InsightOut News was featured as an example of DIY or citizen journalism at a conference held by the LA Media Reform Group.
