= Occupy San Diego =

Protest group against economic inequality

- Part of the "Occupy" protests
- Date: October, 7th 2011 – June 2012
- Location: San Diego, California
- Caused by: Economic inequality, corporate influence over government
- Methods: Demonstration, occupation, protest, street protesters

Injuries/Arrests
- Injuries: 0
- Arrested: 139

Occupy San Diego was one of the many occupation protest movements in the United States. Located in San Diego, California, the protest movement initially began in the city's downtown district at the Civic Center. According to authorities, it had "a growing problem with violence and mounting trash". However this assertion was disputed by protesters and eyewitnesses, since Occupy protesters have been actively cleaning the site since October, 2011. It is based on the Occupy Wall Street movement that began in New York City on September 17 and is one of several "Occupy" protest sites in Southern California, including Occupy Los Angeles.

As of June 2012, Occupy San Diego had continued to engage in organized meetings, events and actions.

== Chronology of events ==
Occupy San Diego started on October 7, when protesters gathered in Children's Park in downtown San Diego. Plans were made to occupy the Civic Center, but out of respect for the Jewish community's observation of Yon Kippur the occupation was moved to the park for the weekend. Occupy San Diego officially moved to the Civic Center that Sunday evening - October 9. The occupation sustained an encampment in the Plaza for a week, until police issued a warning instructing the protesters to clear out on the evening of Thursday, October 14. On Monday, October 10, a man jumped from the top floor of a parking garage in what was later revealed to have been a suicide. That put to rest some of the speculation that it was linked to violence on behalf of protesters.

On Friday, October 28, at approximately 2:00am, the San Diego Police and Sheriff's Department raided the OSD camps at the Civic Center and Children's Park, making 51 arrests. Women who were arrested were subjected to police brutality, and the men who were arrested were brought from the Civic Center to Vista Detention Facility 42 miles away, where they were kept on a bus for over 8 hours, denied bathrooms and water, and forced to urinate in the bus. All charges were dropped in the vast majority of arrests. In 2013, multiple lawsuits were filed against the City and County of San Diego alleging unlawful arrest, police brutality, and other civil rights violations stemming from the October 28 arrests. The lawsuits were settled out of court.

On November 30, protesters clashed with police as protesters set up a voter registration table. The day before, San Diego police arrested former democratic congressional candidate Ray Lutz for setting up a similar voting registration table, Lutz cited a California Supreme Court ruling which in part states that people are allowed to register voters, even on private property.

Nine protesters were arrested on Dec. 5, 2011, including one who had to be removed from a tree.

On December 12, Occupy San Diego protesters joined with other occupy movements across the west coast in an attempt to shut down the ports in San Diego. About one hundred people showed up to the event, and four people were arrested.

Three protesters were arrested on December 22 while they were in their sleeping bags, a fourth man was arrested for recording the police activity with a camera. This brought the total number of arrests related to the movement in San Diego to 139.

== See also ==
Occupy articles

- List of global Occupy protest locations
- Occupy movement
- Timeline of Occupy Wall Street
- We are the 99%

Other U.S. protests

- 2011 United States public employee protests
- 2011 Wisconsin protests

Related articles

- Economic inequality
- Grassroots movement
- Income inequality in the United States
- Lobbying
- Plutocracy
- Protest
- Tea Party protests
- Timeline of Occupy Wall Street
- Wealth inequality in the United States
