= Occupy Los Angeles =

Protest group against economic inequality

- Part of the Occupy movement
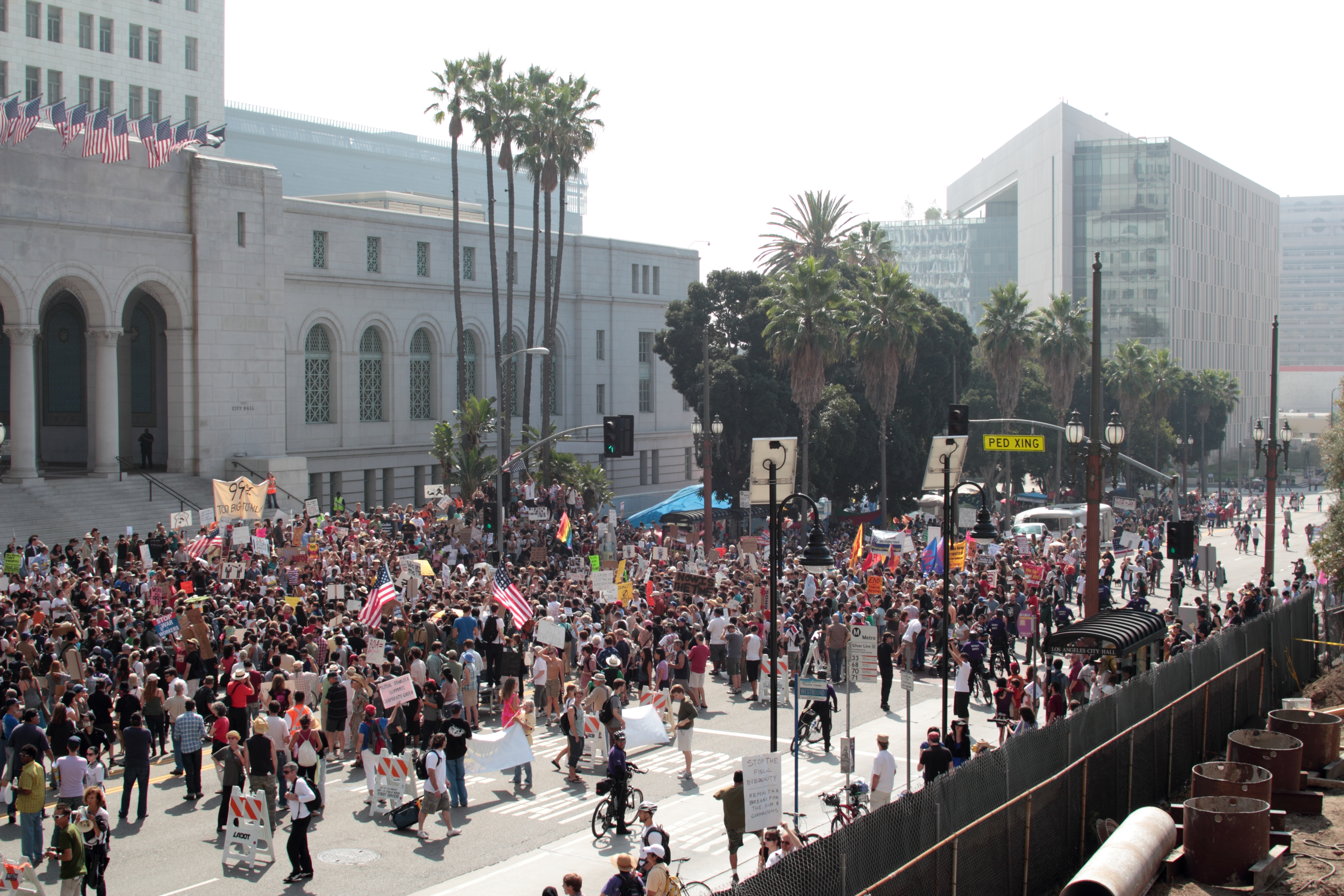
- Date: October 1, 2011 – August 25, 2014 (2 years, 10 months, 3 weeks and 3 days)
- Location: Los Angeles, California, United States
- Caused by: Economic inequality, corporate influence over government, etc.
- Methods: Demonstration, occupation, protest, street protesters
- Result: Eviction by LAPD

Arrests and injuries
- Injuries: unknown
- Arrested: 373

Occupy Los Angeles (also referred to as Occupy L.A.) was one of the many occupy movements in the United States, following the original Occupy Wall Street (OWS) protest. Their purported purpose is to "fight corporate greed and economic injustice". Participants of Occupy L.A. first met at Pershing Square on September 23, 2011. Activists came to consensus to occupy public space in solidarity with the growing movement. Occupiers first marched in Los Angeles on September 24, 2011. They next protested a fundraiser being held in Hollywood at the House of Blues for President Obama. Participants met at Pershing Square every subsequent night to plan out the logistics of an occupation set to begin on October 1, 2011. After debating potential locations around Los Angeles, people decided on the lawns around City Hall. Tents first manifested on October 1, 2011 on the grounds of Los Angeles City Hall.

The camp experienced a relatively uncontentious relationship with the city through its duration.

On November 17, Occupy Los Angeles joined with a permitted organized labor march through downtown Los Angeles. The parade was generally orderly, though a circle of about twenty protesters surrounded three tents in the middle of a street in deliberate disobedient behavior and were arrested. Later in the day, an unpermitted march went to a plaza at the base of the Bank of America tower, when police brought the march to a halt. More protesters were arrested for trespassing, 73 total for the day.

== Overview ==
=== Supporters ===
The movement had several celebrity appearances including NOFX, Amanda Palmer, Deepak Chopra, Jesse Jackson, Bill Maher, Shepard Fairey, Russell Simmons, Tom Morello (from Rage Against the Machine) Jeff Ross. and Danny Glover

Some of these visitors were interviewed by InsightOut News, a grassroots journalism website that emerged from Occupy LA. These interviews were sometimes critical, raising the issue of whether wealthy celebrities could really be aligned with the working class.

=== City Hall eviction ===
Antonio Villaraigosa, mayor of Los Angeles, announced an eviction order deadline of Monday morning, November 28, at 12:01 a.m., giving the reason that "It is time to close the park and repair the grounds so that we can restore public access to the park."

Early Monday morning protesters and the encampment remained after the city ordered an end their protest. Four people were arrested for unlawful assembly.

On Tuesday, November 29, 1,350 police raided Occupy Los Angeles. Five hundred police officers quickly entered the park out of City Hall doors. At 12:30 a.m. LAPD declared the Occupy L.A. site an unlawful assembly, and told demonstrators they had 10 minutes to clear the area or be arrested. A total of 292 people were arrested. After the encampment was empty, 30 tons of trash was removed.

==== Report of Patrick Meighan ====
Patrick Meighan, writer for the Fox animated sitcom Family Guy, was one of the 292 arrests made on November 29. He posted an account of his arrest. He also participated in an eight-part YouTube interview chronicling, in more detail, his experience the night of the raid.

== May Day ==
On May 1, 2012, Occupy Los Angeles resurfaced publicly joining general May Day protests all around Los Angeles. The Occupy supporters organized as "four winds" coming in to downtown Los Angeles from the four directions, starting in Van Nuys in the north, Santa Monica in the west, Cal State Dominguez Hills in the south and East Los Angeles College in the east. A General Assembly was conducted in Pershing Square. Occupy San Fernando Valley, Occupy Rose Parade and Occupy the Hood were all represented. Numerous other protesting groups joined.

== See also ==
- Bank Transfer Day
- List of Occupy movement protest locations
