= Free Radicals (band) =

American band from Houston

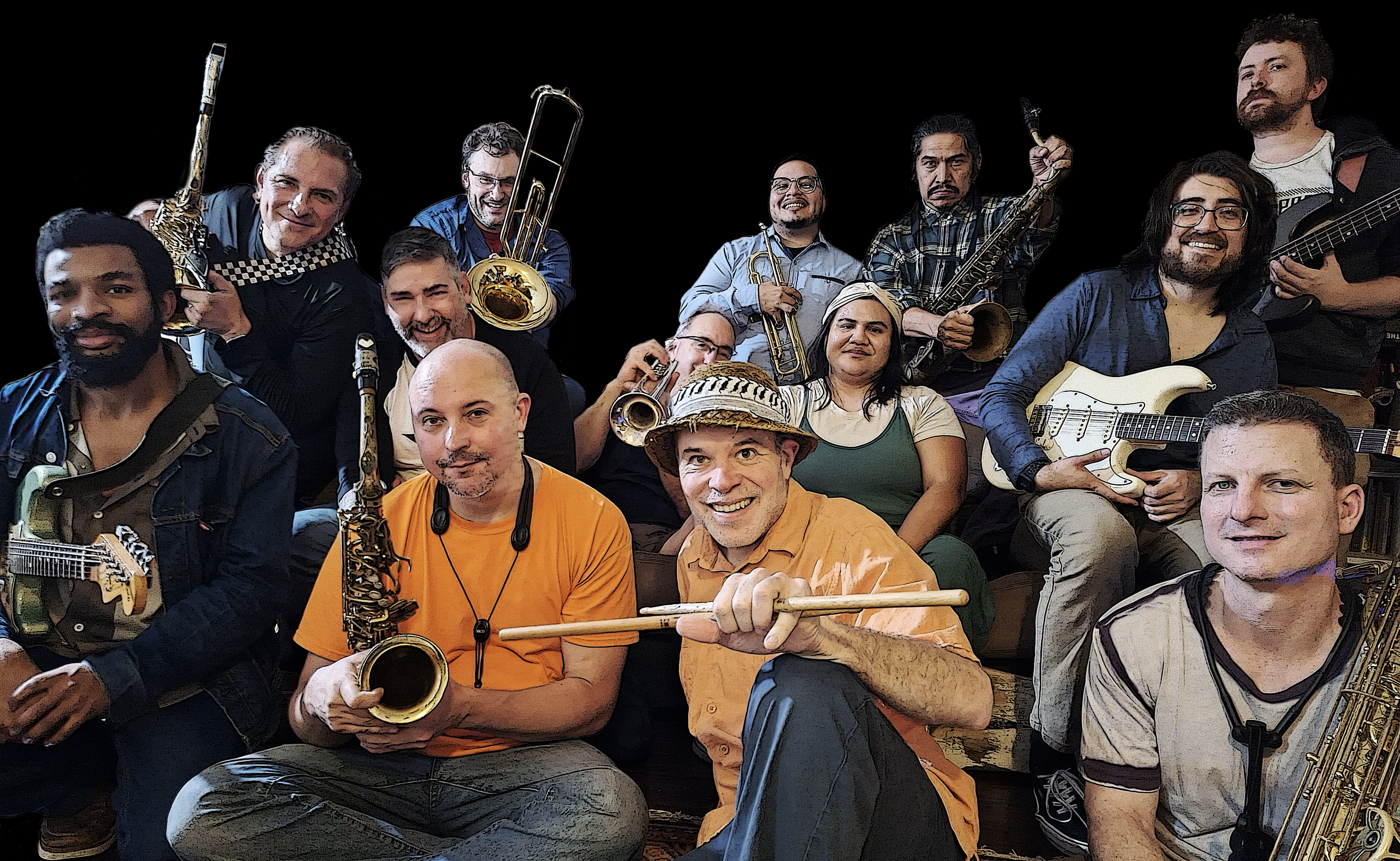
- Free Radicals Core Band Members in 2024

Background information
- Origin: Houston, Texas, U.S.
- Genres: Jazz, funk, ska, reggae, klezmer, hip hop, world
- Years active: 1996–present
- Website: www.freerads.com

Free Radicals is an American band from Houston, Texas, that combines elements of several genres: jazz, funk, ska, reggae, hip-hop, African, and Indian music.

== History ==
The Free Radicals live band includes six or seven members. On recordings — The Rising Tide Sinks All (1998), Our Lady of Eternal Sunny Delights (2000), Aerial Bombardment (2004), and The Freedom Fence (2012) — Free Radicals invites a group of 50 or more musicians and vocalists into the studio.

Drummer Nick Cooper founded the group in 1996, with a goal of specializing in improvised music. In 2000, The New Yorker wrote, "The horn-heavy, continually evolving collective Free Radicals produces a wildly eclectic fusion that has as many influences as there are items in the Houston, Texas, pawnshop in which they honed their sound during all-night jam sessions." In 2010, Dawn wrote that the artwork and message about underwater oil-leaks, oil-wars, and bank-crashes on the band's first CD was like a "premonition waiting to become true." Free Radicals frequent collaborators and guest musicians include Al Pagliuso, Dan Cooper, Harry Sheppard, Gloria Edwards, Nelson Mills III, Subhendu Chakraborty, and Karina Nistal.

The Free Radicals perform many concerts, marches, and fundraisers for anti-authoritarian and radical groups like food not bombs, peace festivals, and charity events including a continuous 24-hour concert in November 1999 to raise money for Kid Care, a health program for children. They have protested against Halliburton, and participated in marches for immigrant rights and for a Houston janitor's union.

== Awards and honors ==
Free Radicals has won the following 21 awards in Houston

- 1998: Best Jazz, Best Unsigned Band
- 1999: Best Jazz, Best Funk, Best Drummer
- 2001: Best Jazz
- 2002: Best Jazz
- 2003: Best Jazz
- 2004: Best CD by Local Musicians
- 2008: Best Jazz
- 2009: Best Jazz, Best Drummer
- 2010: Best Jazz,
- 2011: Best Jazz,
- 2012: Best CD "The Freedom Fence", Best Song "Ben Taub Blues", Best Jazz
- 2013: Best Jazz
- 2014: Best Jazz
- 2015: Best Jazz
- 2020: #1 Best Local Album 2020: "White Power Outage"

== Discography ==
- 1998: The Rising Tide Sinks All
- 2000: Our Lady of Eternal Sunny Delights
- 2004: Aerial Bombardment
- 2012: The Freedom Fence
- 2015: Freedom of Movement
- 2017: Outside the Comfort Zone
- 2018: No State Solution (with DJ Sun) (compilation/remix album)
- 2020: White Power Outage, Vol. 1
- 2022: White Power Outage, Vol. 2
