= List of Occupy movement protest locations =

List of locations of protests by the Occupy Wall Street movement

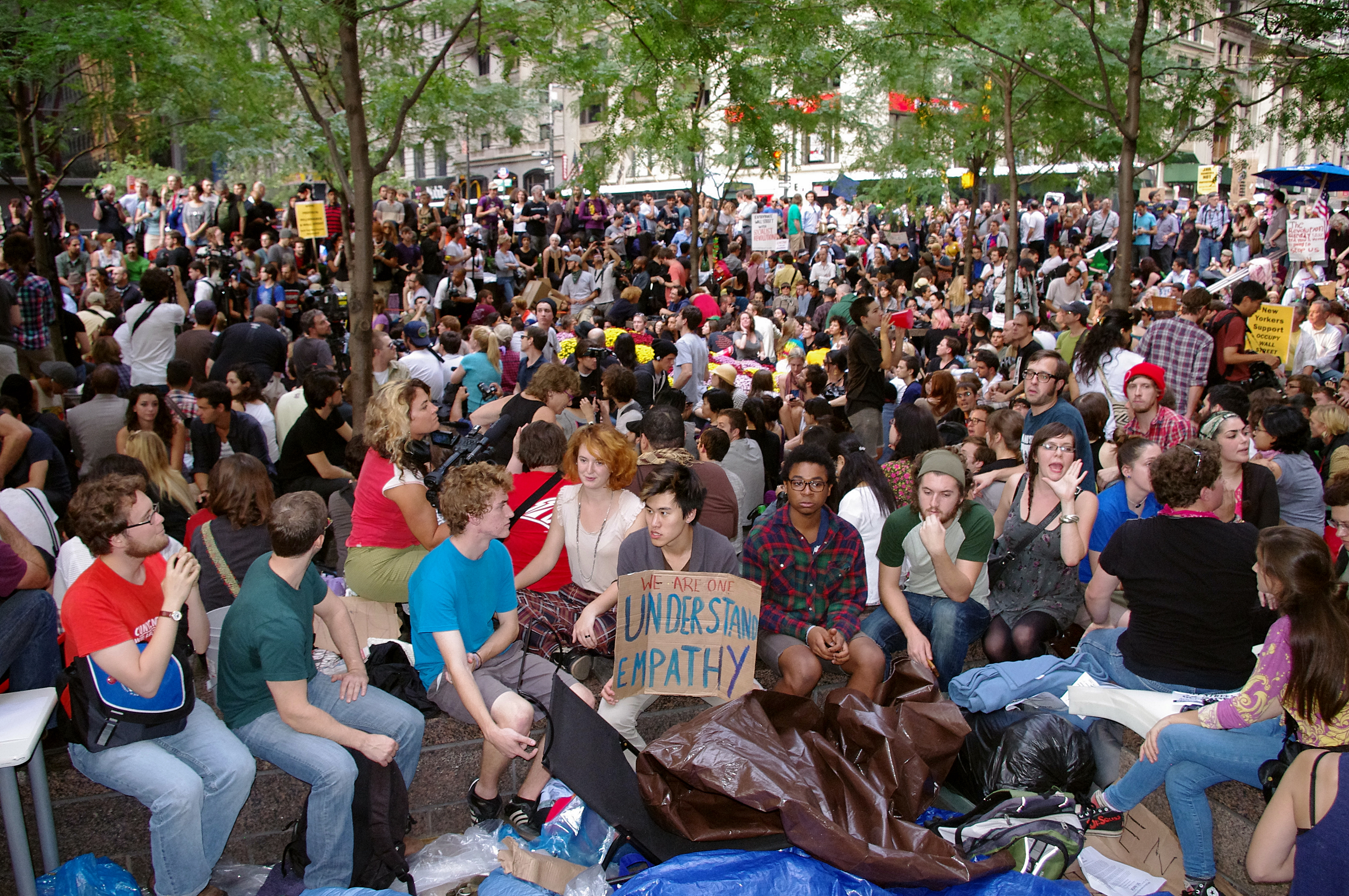
Protesters during day fourteen of Occupy Wall Street (September 30, 2011)

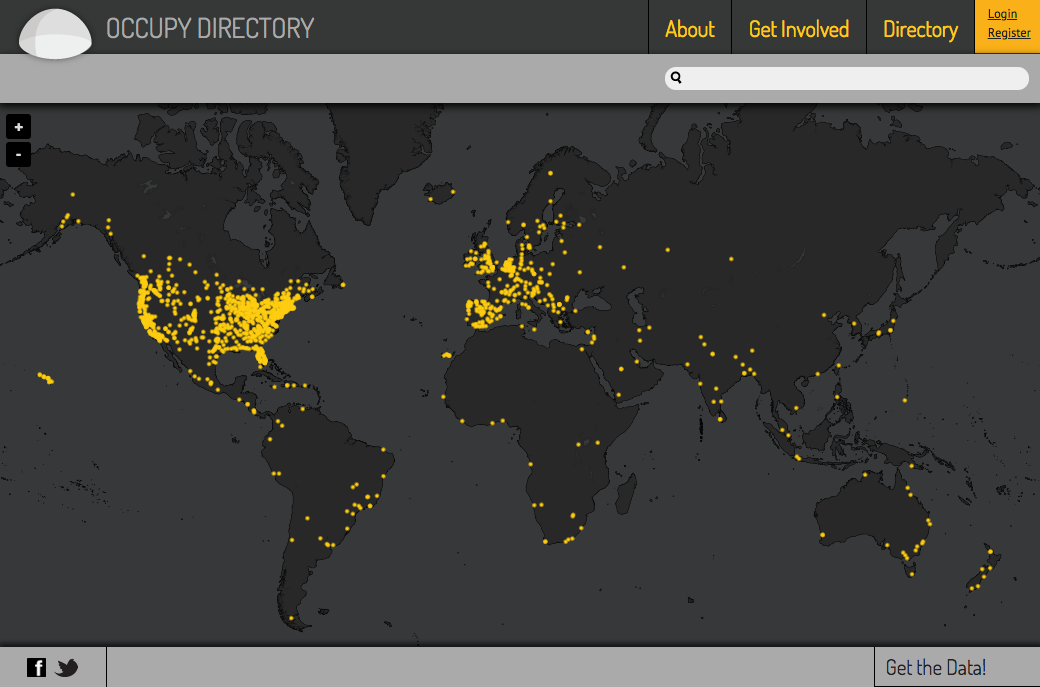
Occupy Directory Map

The Occupy Wall Street protests, which started in 2011, inspired a wide international response. There have been hundreds of Occupy movement protests worldwide over time, intended and organized as non-violent protest against the wealthy, as well as banking institutions. Months before the Occupy movement began, the Movimiento 15-M planned to hold events in many nations on October 15, 2011. The Occupy movement joined in and also held many events in many nations on that day. A list of proposed events for the 15 October 2011 global protests listed events in 951 cities in 82 countries. Protest camps were built at many of the protest locations, often near banking institutions or stock markets. Many locations had further manifestations at the following weekends until "Guy-Fawkes" day since the Guy Fawkes mask had become protester fashion. Many American Occupy groups were active until 2012, some are still active.

On the one-year anniversary of the Occupy Movement (September 17, 2012), The Guardian published the "Occupy Directory"'s "map of the Occupy world".

Protests in 1–4 cities Protests in 5–9 cities Protests in 10 or more cities (accurate as of September 2012)

== Africa ==
Country or region:	City or district:	Date protest began:	Larger crowd sizes:	Refs:	Notes:
Egypt	Cairo	Oct. 15, 2011	20		
Nigeria	Abuja				
Nigeria	Ojota, Lagos	Jan. 2, 2012			
Nigeria	Kano				
South Africa	Cape Town	Oct. 15, 2011	100		
South Africa	Durban	Oct. 15, 2011			
South Africa	East London	Oct. 15, 2011			
South Africa	Grahamstown	Oct. 15, 2011	200		
South Africa	Johannesburg	Oct. 15, 2011	80		
Tunisia	Tunis	Nov. 11, 2011			

== Americas ==
=== Canada ===
Province or territory:	Cities:	Date protest began:	Larger crowd sizes:	Refs:	Notes:
Alberta	Calgary	Oct. 13, 2011	400		
Alberta	Edmonton	Oct. 15, 2011	1,000		Encampment on corporate property owned by Melcor Inc. Involvement from Michael Hudema, Greenpeace, Katie Nelson
Alberta	Red Deer	Oct. 15, 2011	30		
Alberta	Lloydminster	Oct. 15, 2011	7		
British Columbia	Comox Valley	Oct. 15, 2011	200		
British Columbia	Kelowna	Oct. 15, 2011	100		
British Columbia	Kamloops	Oct. 15, 2011	150		
British Columbia	Nanaimo	Oct. 15, 2011	500		
British Columbia	Nelson	Oct. 15, 2011	1,000		
British Columbia	Vancouver	Oct. 15, 2011	4,000		
British Columbia	Victoria	Oct. 15, 2011	1,000		Peoples Assembly of Victoria
Manitoba	Winnipeg	Oct. 15, 2011	400		
New Brunswick	Fredericton	Oct. 15, 2011	100		
New Brunswick	Moncton	Oct. 15, 2011	300		
New Brunswick	Saint John	Oct. 15, 2011	150		
Newfoundland and Labrador	Corner Brook	Oct. 22, 2011	40		
Newfoundland and Labrador	St. John's	Oct. 15, 2011	50		
Nova Scotia	Halifax	Oct. 15, 2011	300		
Ontario	Guelph	Oct. 15, 2011	35		
Ontario	Hamilton	Oct. 15, 2011			
Ontario	London	Oct. 15, 2011	100		
Ontario	Kingston	Oct. 15, 2011	50		
Ontario	North Bay				
Ontario	Thunder Bay				
Ontario	Ottawa	Oct. 15, 2011	700		
Ontario	Sault Ste. Marie	Oct. 15, 2011	25		
Ontario	Sudbury	Oct. 22, 2011	40		
Ontario	Toronto	Oct. 15, 2011	2,500		Occupy Toronto
Ontario	Windsor	Oct. 15, 2011	100		Occupy Windsor
Prince Edward Island	Charlottetown	Oct. 15, 2011	125		
Quebec	Chicoutimi	Oct. 15, 2011	40		
Quebec	Montreal	Oct. 15, 2011	3,000		
Saskatchewan	Regina	Oct. 15, 2011	100		Occupy Regina
Saskatchewan	Saskatoon	Oct. 15, 2011	200		

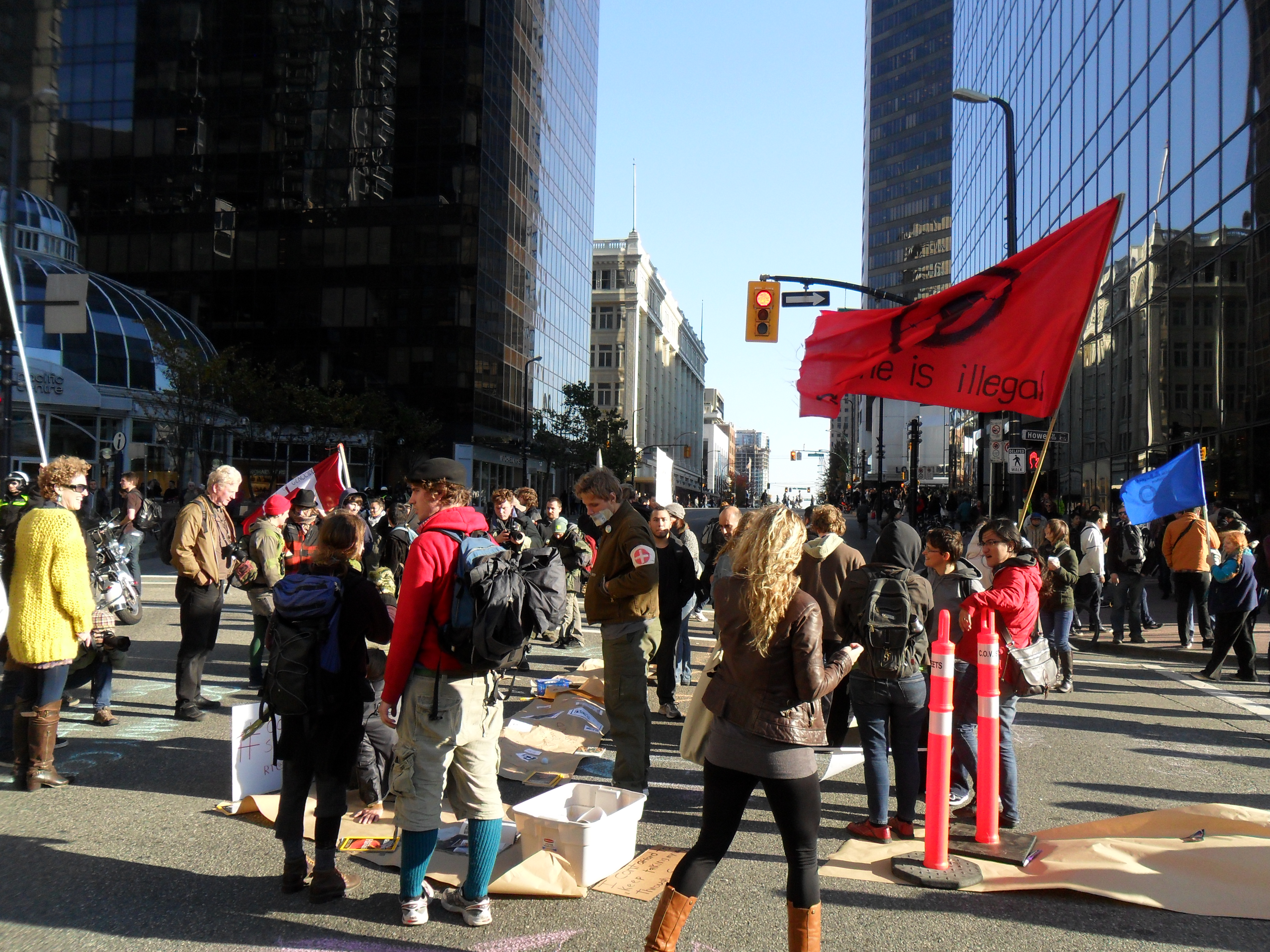
Occupy Vancouver on October 15, 2011.

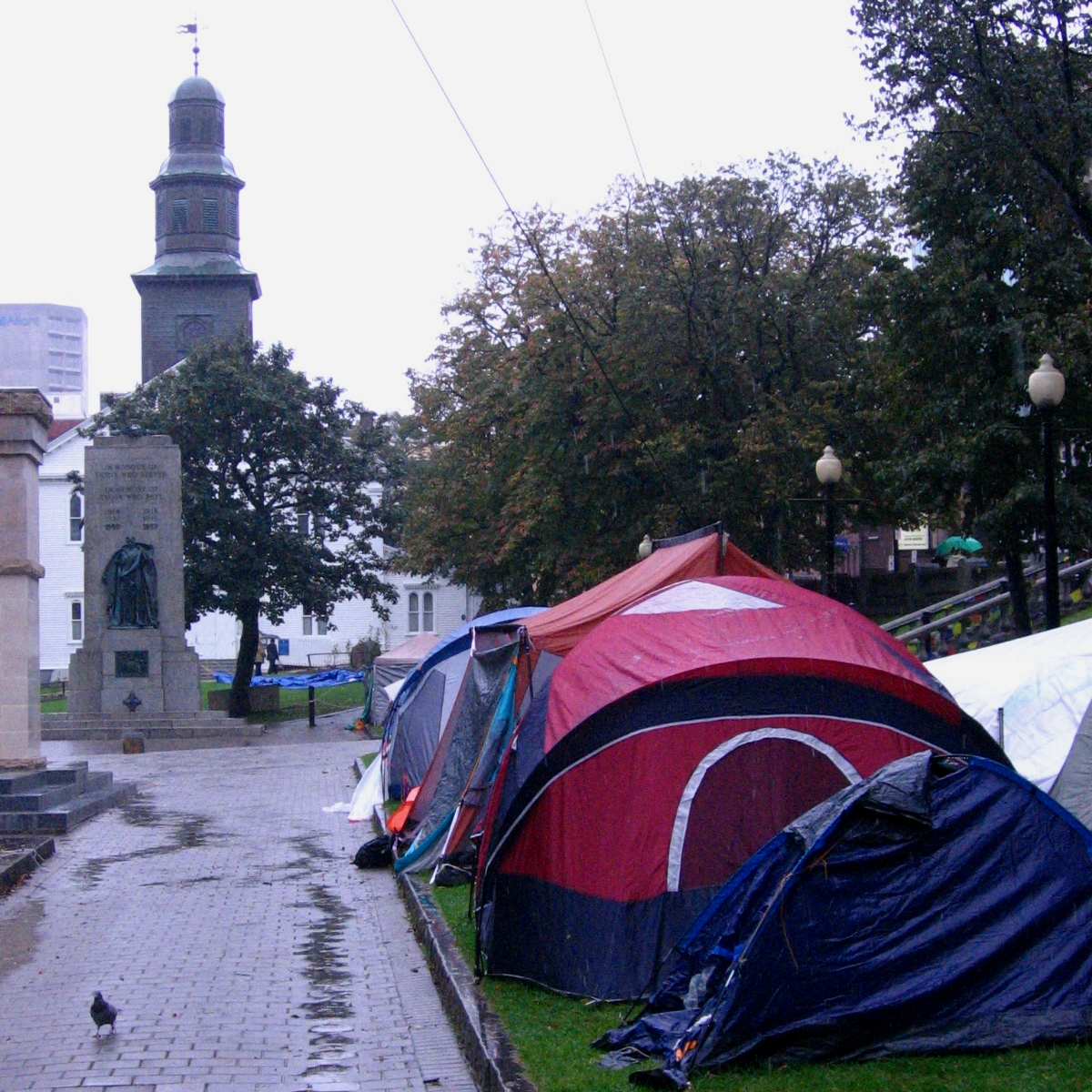
Occupy Nova Scotia in Halifax on Day 6 on October 20, 2011.

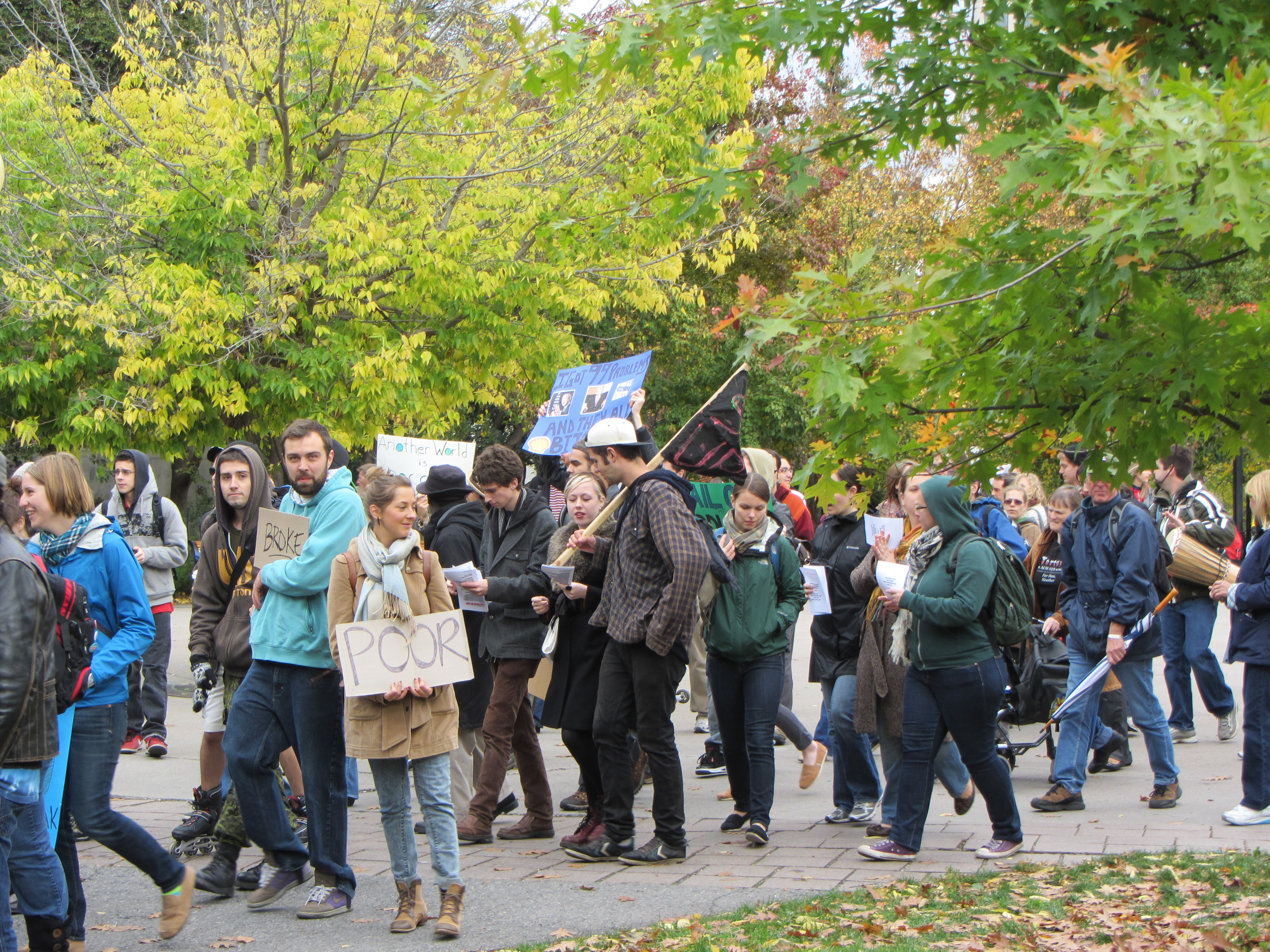
Occupy Ottawa on October 16, 2011.

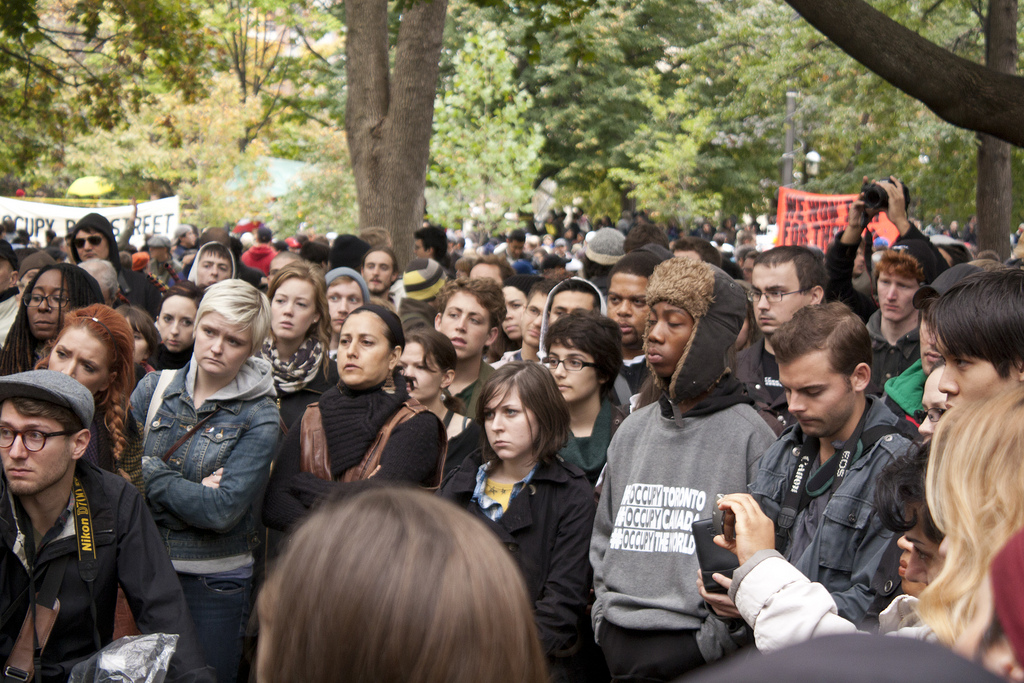
Occupy Toronto protesters on October 15, 2011.

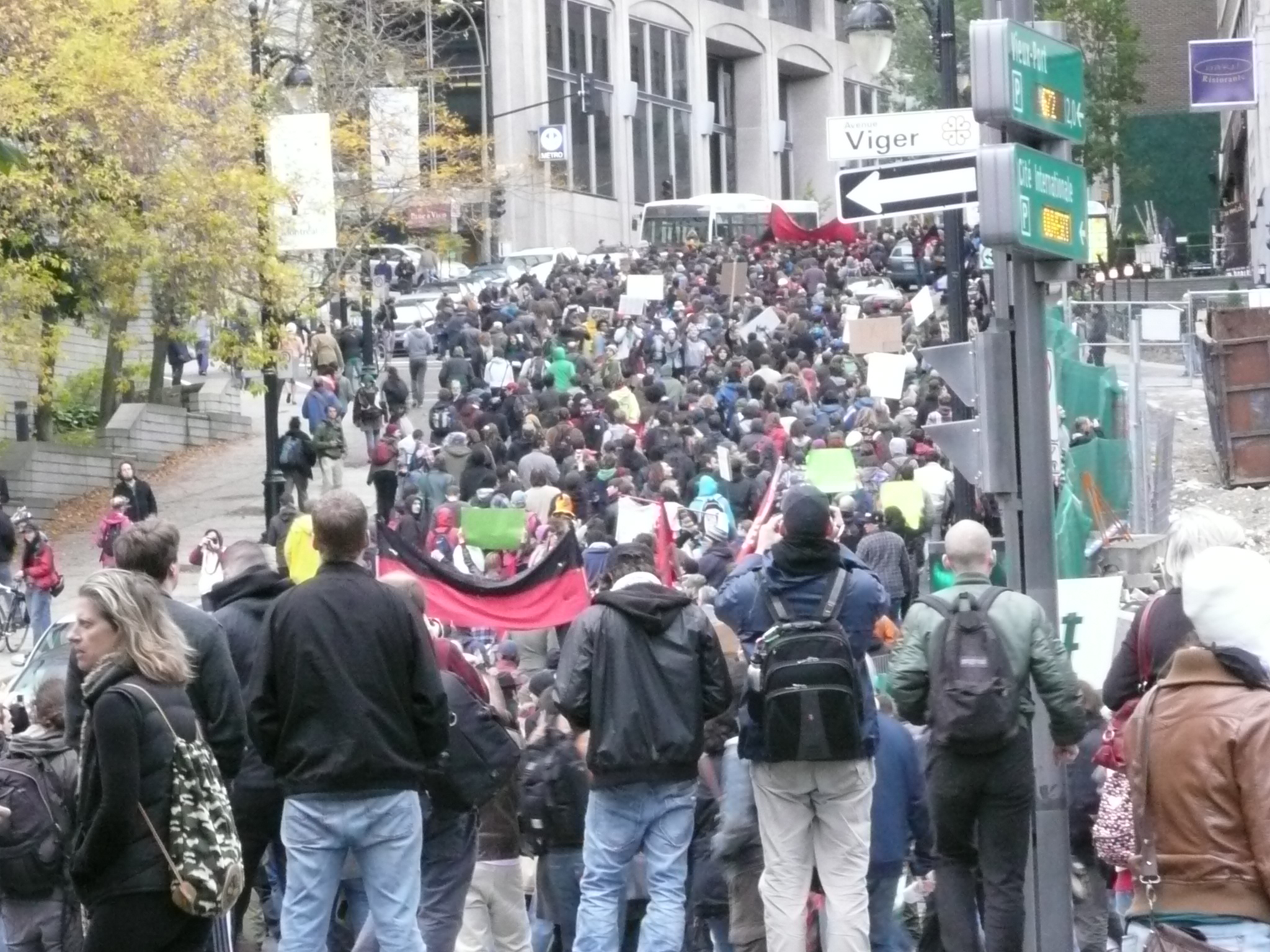
Occupy Montreal marchers on October 15, 2011.

=== Latin America ===
Country or region:	City or district:	Date protest began:	Larger crowd sizes:	Refs:	Notes:
Argentina	Buenos Aires	Oct. 15, 2011	800		
Argentina	Córdoba	Oct. 15, 2011			
Argentina	Mendoza	Oct. 15, 2011			
Argentina	Rosario	Oct. 15, 2011			
Argentina	San Miguel de Tucumán	Oct. 15, 2011			
Argentina	San Salvador de Jujuy	Oct. 15, 2011			
Bolivia		Oct. 15, 2011			
Brazil	Belo Horizonte	Oct. 15, 2011			
Brazil	Campinas	Oct. 15, 2011	20		
Brazil	Curitiba	Oct. 15, 2011	200		
Brazil	Goiânia	Oct. 15, 2011	150		
Brazil	Rio de Janeiro	Oct. 15, 2011	150		
Brazil	Porto Alegre	Oct. 15, 2011	2,000		
Brazil	Salvador, Bahia	Oct. 15, 2011			
Brazil	São Paulo	Oct. 15, 2011	200		
Chile	Concepción	Oct. 15, 2011	500		
Chile	Santiago	Oct. 15, 2011	10,000		
Chile	Valparaíso	Oct. 15, 2011	200		
Colombia	Bogotá	Oct. 15, 2011	70		
Costa Rica	San José	Oct. 15, 2011	200+		
Dominican Republic		Oct. 15, 2011			
Ecuador	Quito	Oct. 15, 2011	100		
Guatemala		Oct. 15, 2011			
Honduras		Oct. 15, 2011			
Mexico	Mexico City	Oct. 15, 2011	250		
Mexico	Monterrey	Oct. 15, 2011			
Mexico	Tijuana	Oct. 15, 2011			
Panama		Oct. 15, 2011			
Paraguay		Oct. 15, 2011			
Peru	Lima	Oct. 15, 2011	500		
Uruguay	Montevideo	Oct. 15, 2011	80		

== Asia ==
Country or region:	City or district:	Date protest began:	Larger crowd sizes:	Refs:	Notes:
Armenia	Yerevan	11 February	300		Mashtots Park Movement
Bahrain	Manama				Occupy Bahrain
China	Luoyang				
China	Zhengzhou	Oct. 6, 2011			
Hong Kong	Central	Oct. 15, 2011	500		
India	Kolkata	Oct. 22, 2011			
India	Mumbai	Oct. 29, 2011			
Indonesia	Jakarta	Oct. 15, 2011			
Israel	Tel Aviv	Oct. 15, 2011	1,500		World's longest lasting Occupy Camp?
Japan	Tokyo	Sep. 11, 2011	100		issues: No Nuclear power; No to Trans-Pacific Partnership (TPP)
Malaysia	Kuala Lumpur	July 30, 2011	200		Occupy Dataran
Mongolia	Ulaanbaatar				
Pakistan	Islamabad	Oct. 26, 2011			
Philippines	Manila	Oct. 15, 2011	100		
Russia	See Europe				
South Korea	Seoul	Oct. 14, 2011	1,000		
Taiwan	Taipei	Oct. 15, 2011	100		
Turkey	See under Europe				

Mashtots Park activists protesting in front of the city hall of Yerevan, Armenia.

== Europe ==
Country or region:	City or district:	Date protest began:	Larger crowd sizes:	Refs:	Notes:
Belgium	Antwerp	Oct. 22, 2011	400		
Belgium	Brussels	Oct. 15, 2011	8,000		Last day of campaign "March to Brussels"
Belgium	Leuven		200		
Bosnia and Herzegovina	Banja Luka	Oct. 15, 2011	50		
Bosnia and Herzegovina	Sarajevo	Oct. 15, 2011	150		
Croatia	Buje	Oct. 15, 2011	40		
Croatia	Dubrovnik	Oct. 15, 2011	30		
Croatia	Pula	Oct. 15, 2011	150		
Croatia	Rijeka	Oct. 15, 2011	300		
Croatia	Split	Oct. 15, 2011	1,000+		
Croatia	Zagreb	Oct. 15, 2011	10,000		
Czech Republic	Prague	Oct. 15, 2011	300		
Cyprus	Nicosia	Oct. 15, 2011			Occupy Buffer Zone
Denmark	Copenhagen	Oct. 15, 2011	3,000		
Estonia	Tallinn	Oct. 15, 2011	200		
France organised since May and known as Les Indignés	Aix-en-Provence	Oct. 15, 2011	60		
France organised since May and known as Les Indignés	Auch	Oct. 15, 2011	50		
France organised since May and known as Les Indignés	Dijon	Oct. 15, 2011	100		
France organised since May and known as Les Indignés	Grenoble	Oct. 15, 2011	500		
France organised since May and known as Les Indignés	Lyon	Oct. 15, 2011			
France organised since May and known as Les Indignés	Marseille	Oct. 15, 2011	200+		
France organised since May and known as Les Indignés	Montpellier	Oct. 15, 2011	200		
France organised since May and known as Les Indignés	Nantes	Oct. 15, 2011	100		
France organised since May and known as Les Indignés	Paris	Oct. 15, 2011	2,000		
France organised since May and known as Les Indignés	Pau	Oct. 15, 2011	40		
France organised since May and known as Les Indignés	Réunion	Oct. 15, 2011	30		
France organised since May and known as Les Indignés	Rochefort	Oct. 15, 2011	20		
France organised since May and known as Les Indignés	Strasbourg	Oct. 15, 2011	1,000		
France organised since May and known as Les Indignés	Toulouse	Oct. 15, 2011	1,000		
Finland	Helsinki	Oct. 15, 2011	1,000		
Finland	Joensuu	Oct. 15, 2011	130		
Finland	Jyväskylä	Oct. 15, 2011	200		
Finland	Tampere	Oct. 15, 2011	400		
Finland	Turku	Oct. 15, 2011	500		
Finland	Vantaa	Nov. 2, 2011	500		
Germany	Berlin	Oct. 15, 2011	10,000		Occupy Berlin
Germany	Bochum	Oct. 15, 2011	400		
Germany	Cologne	Oct. 15, 2011	1,500		
Germany	Düsseldorf	Oct. 15, 2011	2,400		camp on church-owned area
Germany	Dresden	Oct. 15, 2011	1,000		
Germany	Freiburg im Breisgau	Oct. 15, 2011	300		
Germany	Frankfurt	Oct. 15, 2011	5,000		camp in front of European Central Bank
Germany	Hamburg	Oct. 15, 2011	5,000		camp near HSH Nordbank, evicted Jan. 6, 2014
Germany	Hanover	Oct. 15, 2011	600+		
Germany	Karlsruhe	Oct. 15, 2011	220+		
Germany	Kiel	Oct. 15, 2011			camp next to regional bank Förde-Sparkasse
Germany	Leipzig	Oct. 15, 2011	2,500		
Germany	Munich	Oct. 15, 2011	1,000		
Germany	Rostock	Oct. 15, 2011	30		
Germany	Stuttgart	Oct. 15, 2011	3,000		
Greece	Athens	Oct. 15, 2011	4,000		
Greece	Thessaloniki	Oct. 15, 2011	2,000		
Hungary	Budapest	Oct. 15, 2011	2,000		
Hungary	Pécs	Oct. 15, 2011	200		
Iceland	Reykjavík	Oct. 15, 2011			Occupy Reykjavik
Ireland	Cork	Oct. 15, 2011	400		Occupy Cork
Ireland	Dublin	Oct. 8, 2011	2,500		Occupy Dame Street
Ireland	Galway	Oct. 15, 2011	100		
Ireland	Letterkenny	Oct. 22, 2011			
Ireland	Limerick	Nov. 23, 2011	20		
Ireland	Waterford	Oct. 15, 2011	50		
Italy	Milan	Oct. 15, 2011	700		
Italy	Rome	Oct. 15, 2011	200,000		2011 Rome demonstration
Italy	Rome	Oct. 19, 2013	200		"Occupy Porta Pia"
Kosovo	Pristina	Oct. 15, 2011	50		
Macedonia	Skopje	Oct. 15, 2011			
Montenegro	Podgorica	Oct. 15, 2011	100		
Netherlands	Alkmaar	Oct. 29, 2011	30		
Netherlands	Amersfoort	Oct. 22, 2011	40		
Netherlands	Amsterdam	Oct. 16, 2011	2,000		
Netherlands	Arnhem	Oct. 27, 2011	40		
Netherlands	Assen	Oct. 28, 2011			
Netherlands	Deventer	Oct. 27, 2011			
Netherlands	Doetinchem	Oct. 29, 2011	30		
Netherlands	Dordrecht				
Netherlands	Ede				Occupy Ede
Netherlands	Eindhoven	Nov. 5, 2011	30		
Netherlands	Groningen	Oct. 07, 2011 website; Oct. 15 demonstration; Oct. 22 tent camp	7		
Netherlands	Haarlem	Nov. 1, 2011	8		
Netherlands	The Hague	Oct. 15, 2011	700		
Netherlands	Leeuwarden	Oct. 24, 2011	100		
Netherlands	Maaskantje	Nov. 18, 2011	20		
Netherlands	Nijmegen	Oct. 15, 2011			
Netherlands	Rotterdam	Oct. 15, 2011			
Netherlands	Tilburg	Nov. 5, 2011	30		
Netherlands	Utrecht	Oct. 15, 2011	50		
Netherlands	Venlo				
Netherlands	Zwolle				
Norway	Oslo	Oct. 15, 2011			Occupy Oslo
Norway	Bergen	Oct. 15, 2011			
Poland	Kraków				
Poland	Warsaw	Oct. 15, 2011	150-200		
Portugal - under the name "indignados"	Barcelos	Oct. 15, 2011			
Portugal - under the name "indignados"	Braga	Oct. 15, 2011			
Portugal - under the name "indignados"	Coimbra	Oct. 15, 2011			
Portugal - under the name "indignados"	Évora	Oct. 15, 2011			
Portugal - under the name "indignados"	Faro	Oct. 15, 2011			
Portugal - under the name "indignados"	Funchal	Oct. 15, 2011			
Portugal - under the name "indignados"	Lisbon	Oct. 15, 2011	20,000		
Portugal - under the name "indignados"	Porto	Oct. 15, 2011	20,000		
Portugal - under the name "indignados"	Santarém	Oct. 15, 2011			
Romania	Bucharest				
Russia	Moscow	Nov. 7, 2011	100		
Serbia	Belgrade	Oct. 15, 2011	200		
Slovakia	Bratislava	Oct. 15, 2011	150		
Slovenia - under the name "Za več svobode" ("For more freedom").	Koper	Oct. 15, 2011	300		
Slovenia - under the name "Za več svobode" ("For more freedom").	Ljubljana	Oct. 15, 2011	4,000		
Slovenia - under the name "Za več svobode" ("For more freedom").	Maribor	Oct. 15, 2011	400		
Spain - organized before Occupy as Movimiento 15-M / Indignados .	Barcelona	Oct. 15, 2011	400,000		2011 Spanish protests
Spain - organized before Occupy as Movimiento 15-M / Indignados .	Madrid	Oct. 15, 2011	500,000		2011 Spanish protests
Spain - organized before Occupy as Movimiento 15-M / Indignados .	Málaga	Oct. 15, 2011	20,000		2011 Spanish protests
Spain - organized before Occupy as Movimiento 15-M / Indignados .	Mieres	Oct. 15, 2011	15,000		2011 Spanish protests
Spain - organized before Occupy as Movimiento 15-M / Indignados .	Las Palmas	Oct. 15, 2011	5,000		2011 Spanish protests
Spain - organized before Occupy as Movimiento 15-M / Indignados .	Palma de Mallorca	Oct. 15, 2011	10,000		2011 Spanish protests
Spain - organized before Occupy as Movimiento 15-M / Indignados .	Pontevedra	Oct. 15, 2011	4,000		2011 Spanish protests
Spain - organized before Occupy as Movimiento 15-M / Indignados .	Valencia	Oct. 15, 2011	100,000		2011 Spanish protests
Sweden	Gothenburg	Oct. 15, 2011			
Sweden	Helsingborg	Oct. 15, 2011			
Sweden	Malmö	Oct. 15, 2011			
Sweden	Norrköping	Oct. 15, 2011			
Sweden	Östersund	Oct. 15, 2011			
Sweden	Stockholm	Oct. 15, 2011	1,000		
Sweden	Sundsvall	Oct. 15, 2011			
Sweden	Umeå	Oct. 15, 2011	200		
Sweden	Uppsala	Oct. 15, 2011			
Switzerland	Geneva	Oct. 15, 2011	300		
Switzerland	Zurich	Oct. 15, 2011	500		
Turkey	Istanbul	Oct. 30, 2011	100		"Occupy Starbucks": student occupation of Starbucks at Boğaziçi University, on the European side of the Bosphorus, began 6 Dec. 2011.
Turkey	Istanbul	May 27, 2013	1,000,000 (Turkey-wide)		Occupy Gezi
United Kingdom	Bath	Oct. 30, 2011	30		Occupy Bath
United Kingdom	Belfast	Oct. 15, 2011			
United Kingdom	Birmingham	Oct. 15, 2011	100		
United Kingdom	Bournemouth				
United Kingdom	Bradford				
United Kingdom	Brighton	Oct. 29, 2011	30+ at peak, now none.		Destroyed by fire
United Kingdom	Bristol	Oct. 15, 2011			
United Kingdom	Cardiff	Nov. 11, 2011			
United Kingdom	Edinburgh	Oct. 15, 2011			Occupy Edinburgh
United Kingdom	Exeter	Nov. 12, 2011	80		
United Kingdom	Glasgow	Oct. 15, 2011			Occupy Glasgow
United Kingdom	Lampeter				
United Kingdom	Lancaster	Nov. 30, 2011	40		
United Kingdom	Leeds	Nov. 11, 2011	10		
United Kingdom	Liverpool	Nov. 26, 2011	50 (peak)		
United Kingdom	London	Oct. 15, 2011	3,000		Occupy London (The Occupied Times of London)
United Kingdom	Manchester	Oct. 2, 2011	50+		
United Kingdom	Norwich	Oct. 15, 2011	200		
United Kingdom	Plymouth	Nov. 5, 2011			
United Kingdom	Sheffield		100		
United Kingdom	Thanet	Jan. 27, 2012			Occupy Thanet
United Kingdom	University of Brighton	Dec. 2, 2011	30		
United Kingdom	University of Warwick	Nov. 23, 2011	60+		

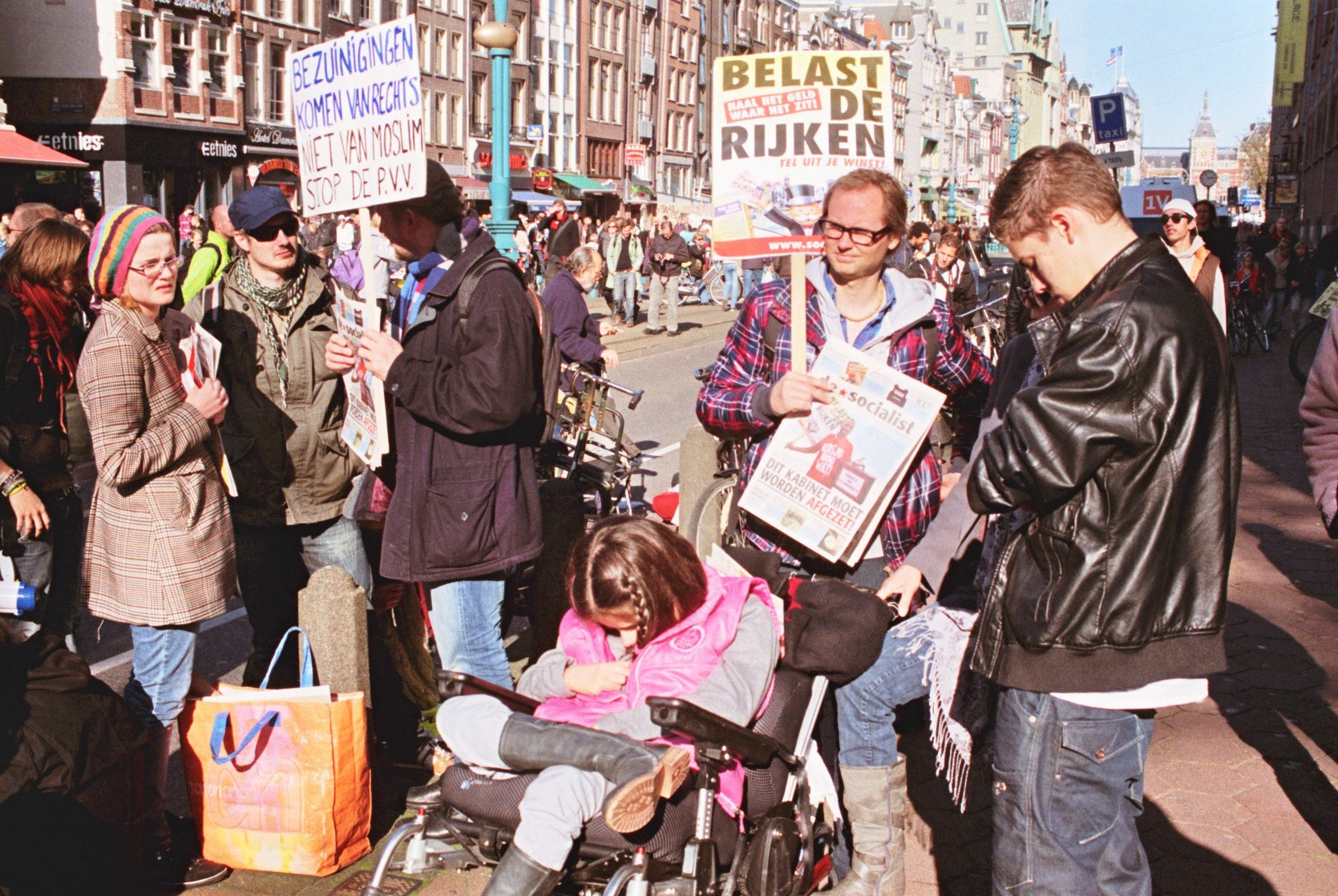
Protestors of the Occupy movement in front of the Stock Exchange in Amsterdam on October 15, 2011.

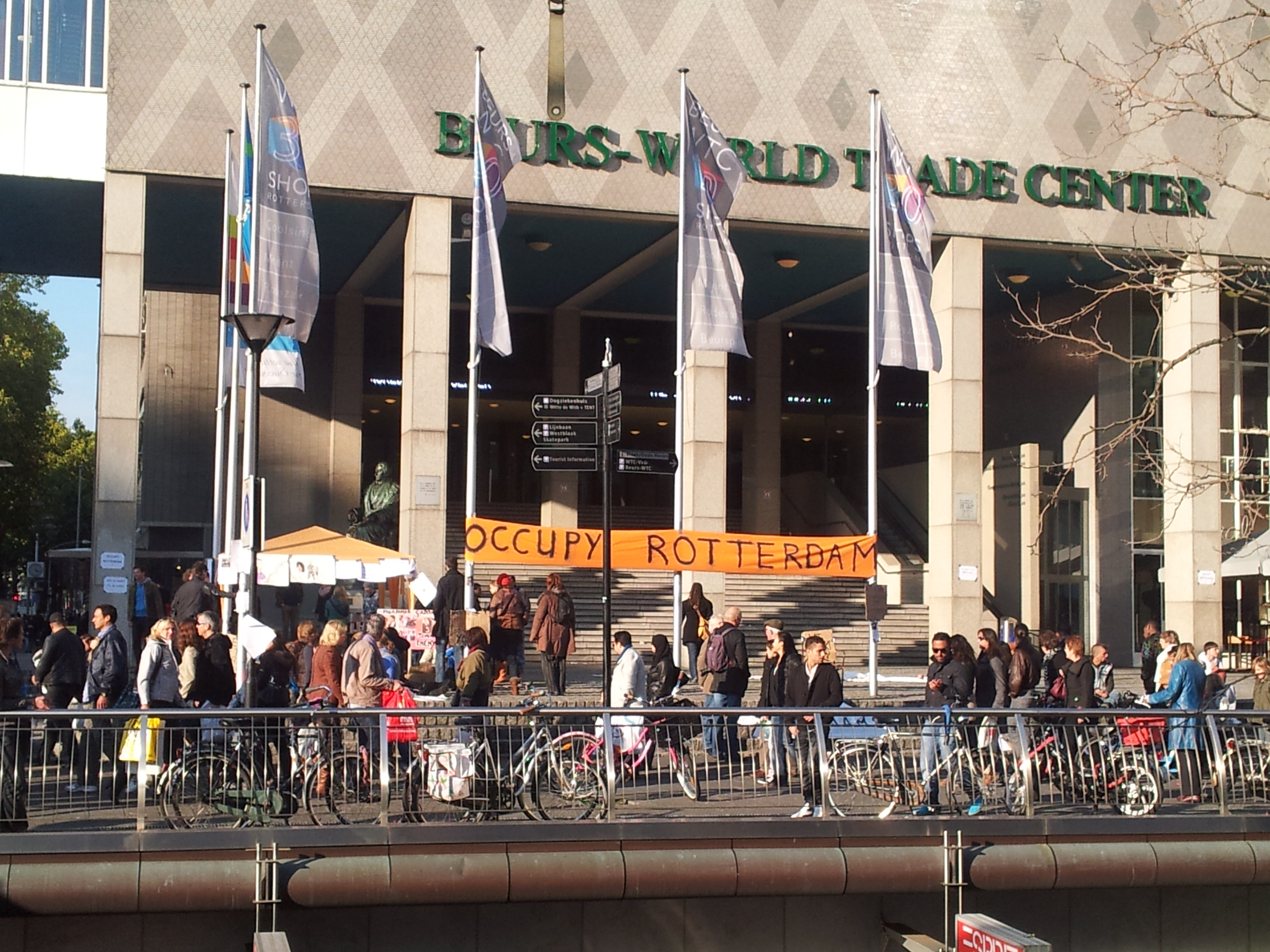
Occupy Rotterdam on October 22, 2011 in front of the Beurs-World Trade Center.

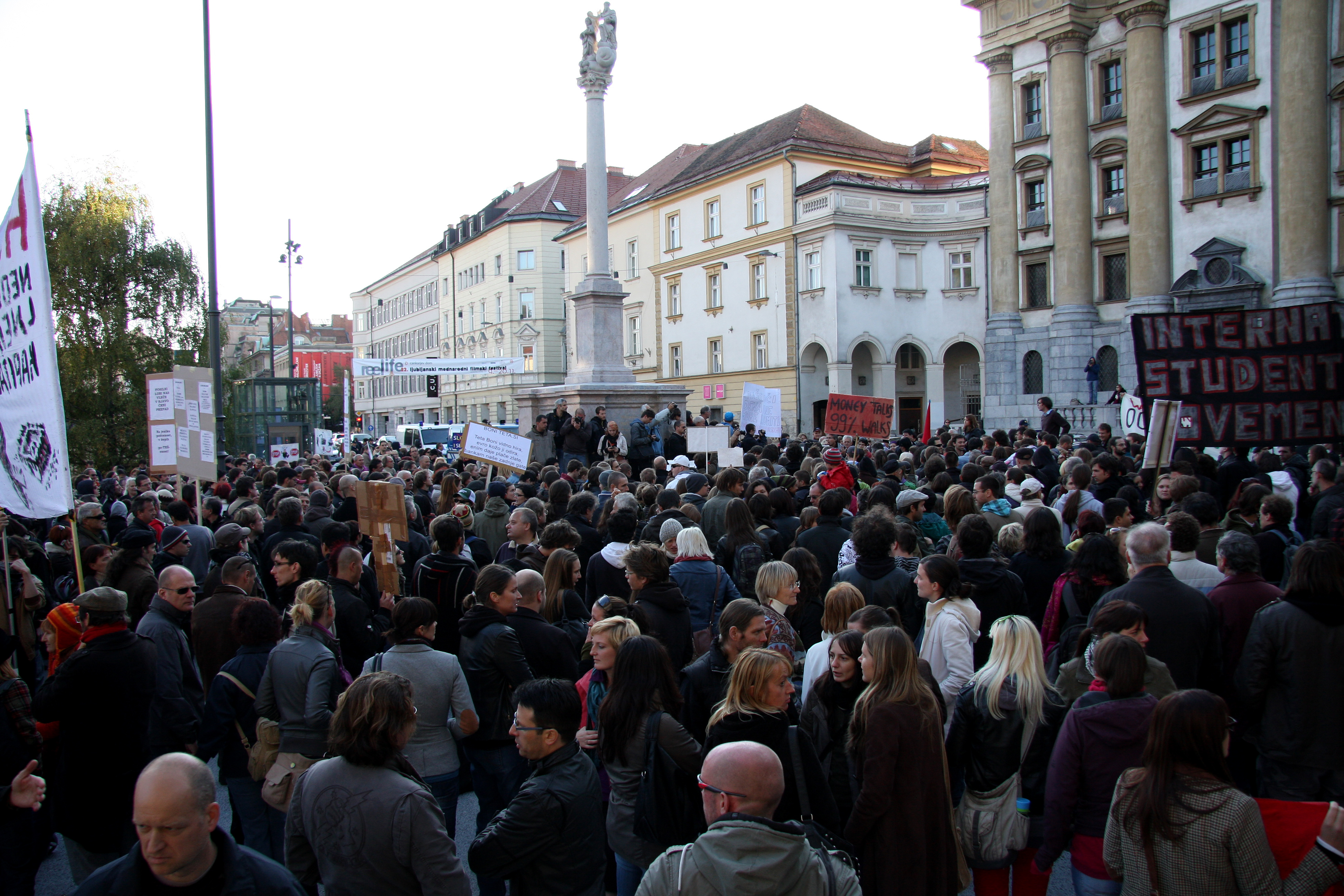
A crowd of protestors in Congress Square, Ljubljana, Slovenia on October 15, 2011.

Tents and a protester's bicycle at Ledra/Lokmacı checkpoint in Occupy Buffer Zone in Cyprus, December 2011.

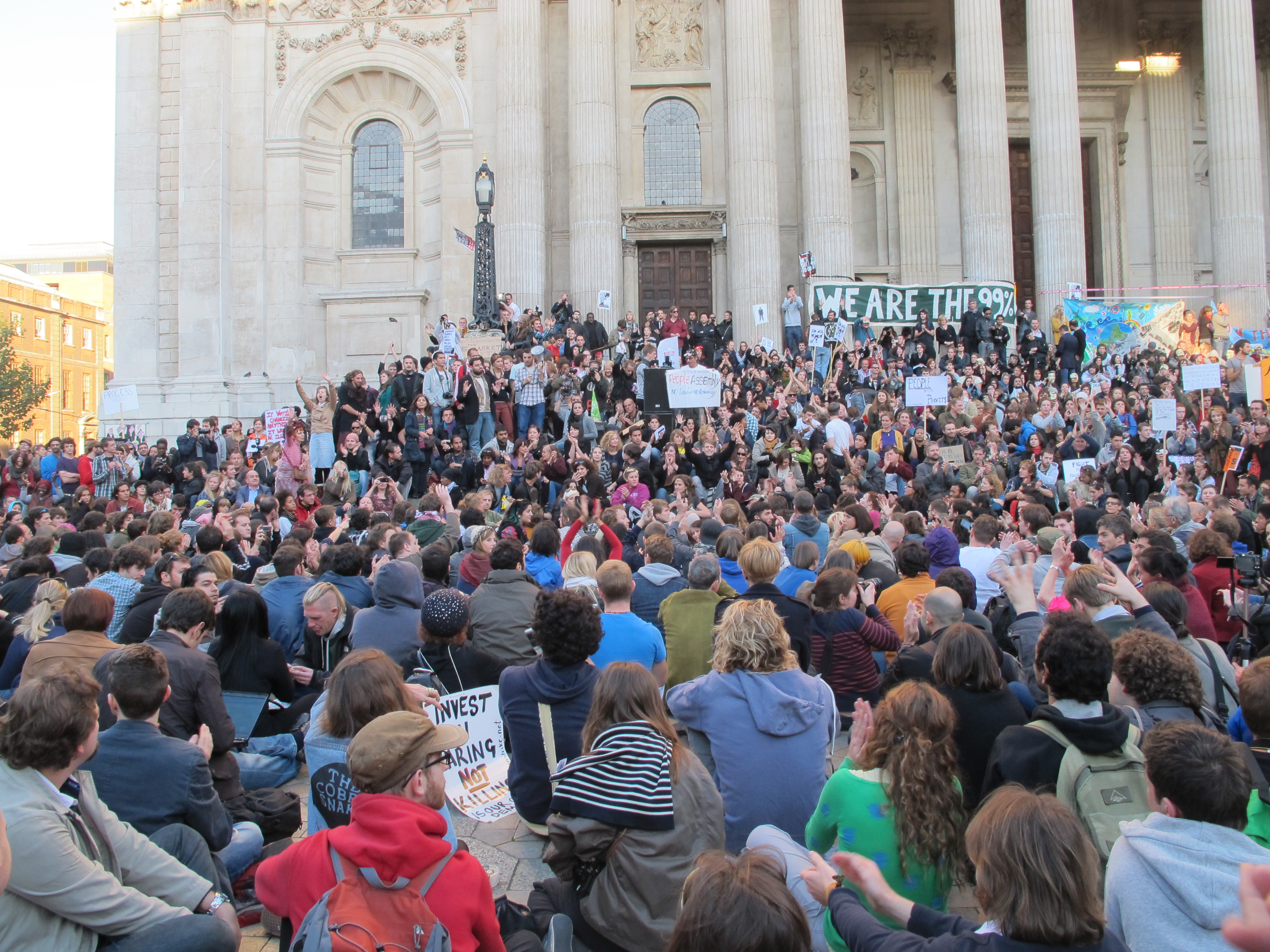
A crowd of protestors in London on October 15, 2011.

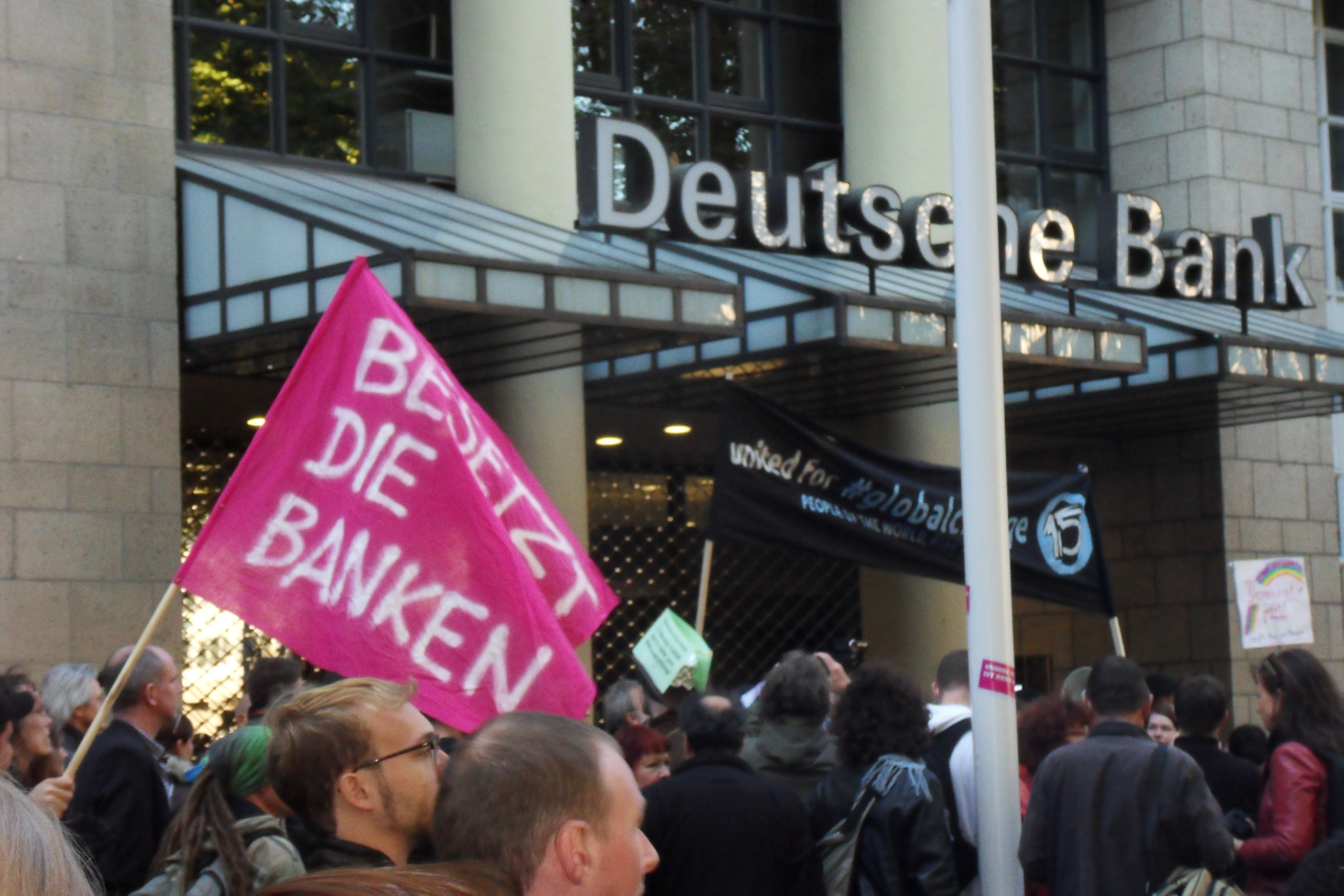
Occupy Düsseldorf on October 15, 2011.

== Oceania ==
Country or region:	City or district:	Date protest began:	Larger crowd sizes:	Refs:	Notes:
Australia	Adelaide, South Australia	Oct. 15, 2011			
Australia	Ballarat, Victoria	Dec. 3, 2011			
Australia	Brisbane, Queensland	Oct. 15, 2011			Post Office Square CBD
Australia	Byron Bay, New South Wales	Oct. 15, 2011	400		
Australia	Cairns, Queensland	Oct. 15, 2011	50		
Australia	Canberra, Australian Capital Territory	Oct. 15, 2011	50		
Australia	Castlemaine, Victoria	Nov. 17, 2011	100		
Australia	Darwin, Northern Territory				
Australia	Fitzroy, Victoria	Nov. 04, 2011	200		Occupation of Edinburgh Gardens
Australia	Geelong, Victoria	Mar. 17, 2012			
Australia	Gold Coast, Queensland	Oct. 15, 2011	50		Absorbed by Occupy Brisbane after eviction
Australia	Hobart, Tasmania	Oct. 29, 2011			
Australia	Kingaroy, Queensland				
Australia	Latrobe Valley, Victoria	Mar. 2, 2012			
Australia	Launceston, Tasmania				
Australia	Melbourne, Victoria	Oct. 15, 2011	4,000		Occupy Melbourne
Australia	Perth, Western Australia	Oct. 28, 2011			
Australia	Sydney, New South Wales	Oct. 15, 2011	3,000		Occupy Sydney
Australia	Townsville, Queensland	Oct. 15, 2011			
Australia	Wonthaggi, Victoria	Jan. 7, 2012	30		
New Zealand	Auckland	Oct. 15, 2011	3,000		
New Zealand	Christchurch	Oct. 15, 2011	50		
New Zealand	Wellington	Oct. 15, 2011	200		
New Zealand	Dunedin	Oct. 15, 2011			
New Zealand	Invercargill				

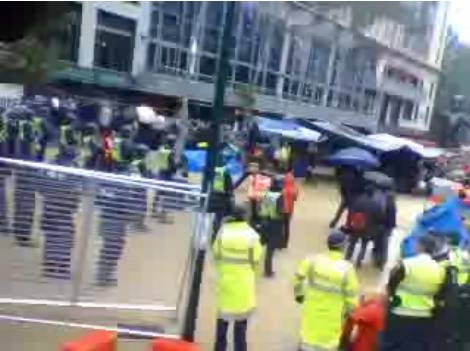
Occupy Melbourne eviction on 21 October 2011

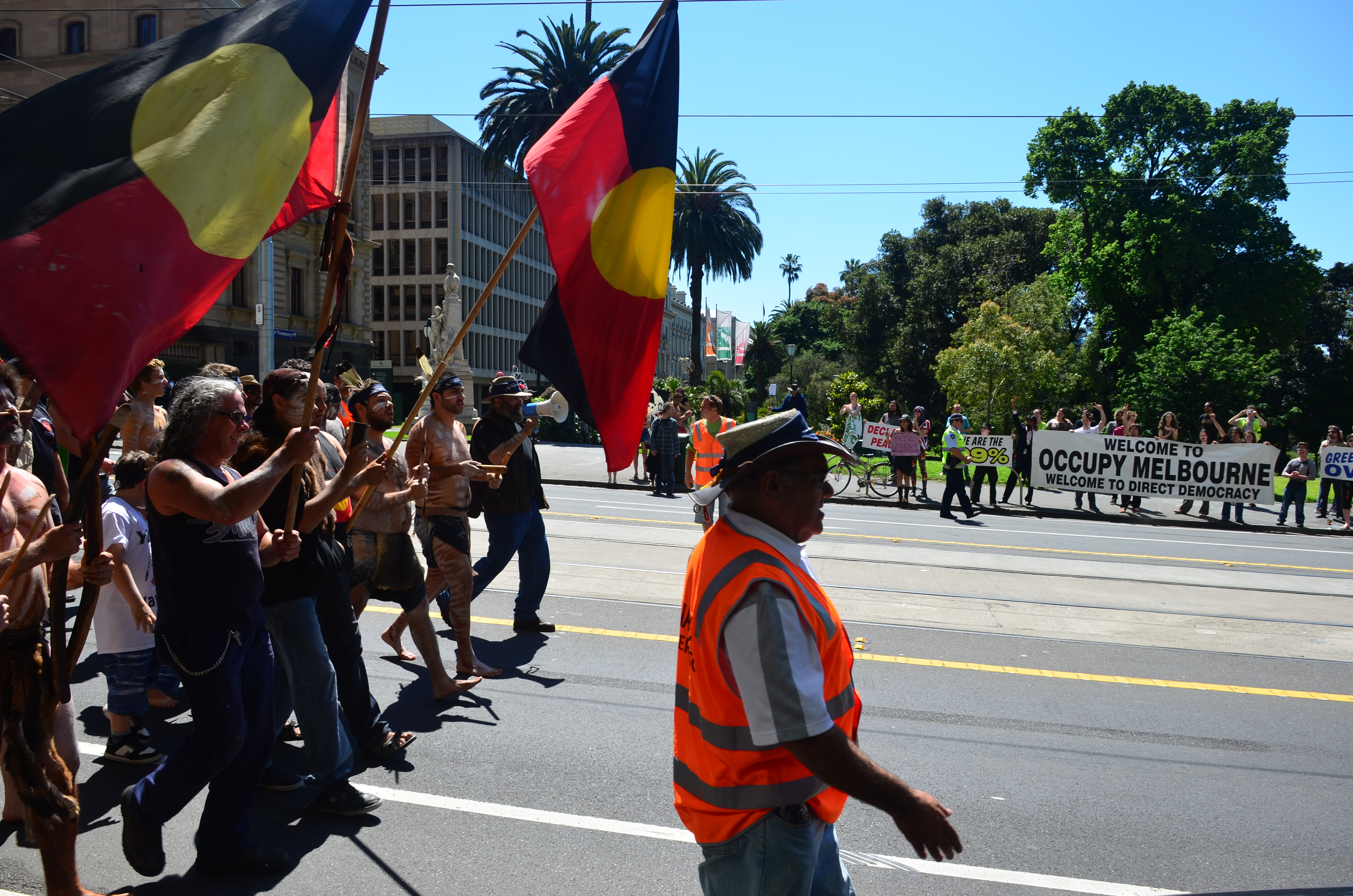
Thousand Warrior March passing Occupy Melbourne protest in Treasury Gardens

== See also ==
- List of Occupy movement topics
- Timeline of Occupy Wall Street
- We are the 99%

Other U.S. protests

- 2011 United States public employee protests
- 2011 Wisconsin protests

Other international protests

- 15 October 2011 global protests
- 2010–2011 Greek protests
- 2011 Chilean protests
- 2011 Israeli social justice protests
- 2011 United Kingdom anti-austerity protests and 2010 UK student protests
- 2010 student protest in Dublin
- Iceland Kitchenware Revolution
- Spanish 15M Indignants movement

Related articles

- Bank Transfer Day
- Corruption Perceptions Index
- Economic inequality
- Grassroots movement
- Impact of the Arab Spring
- Income inequality in the United States
- List of countries by distribution of wealth
- List of countries by income equality
- Plutocracy
- Wealth inequality in the United States
