= Occupy Melbourne =

Social movement in Australia, part of the global Occupy movement

- Part of the Occupy movement
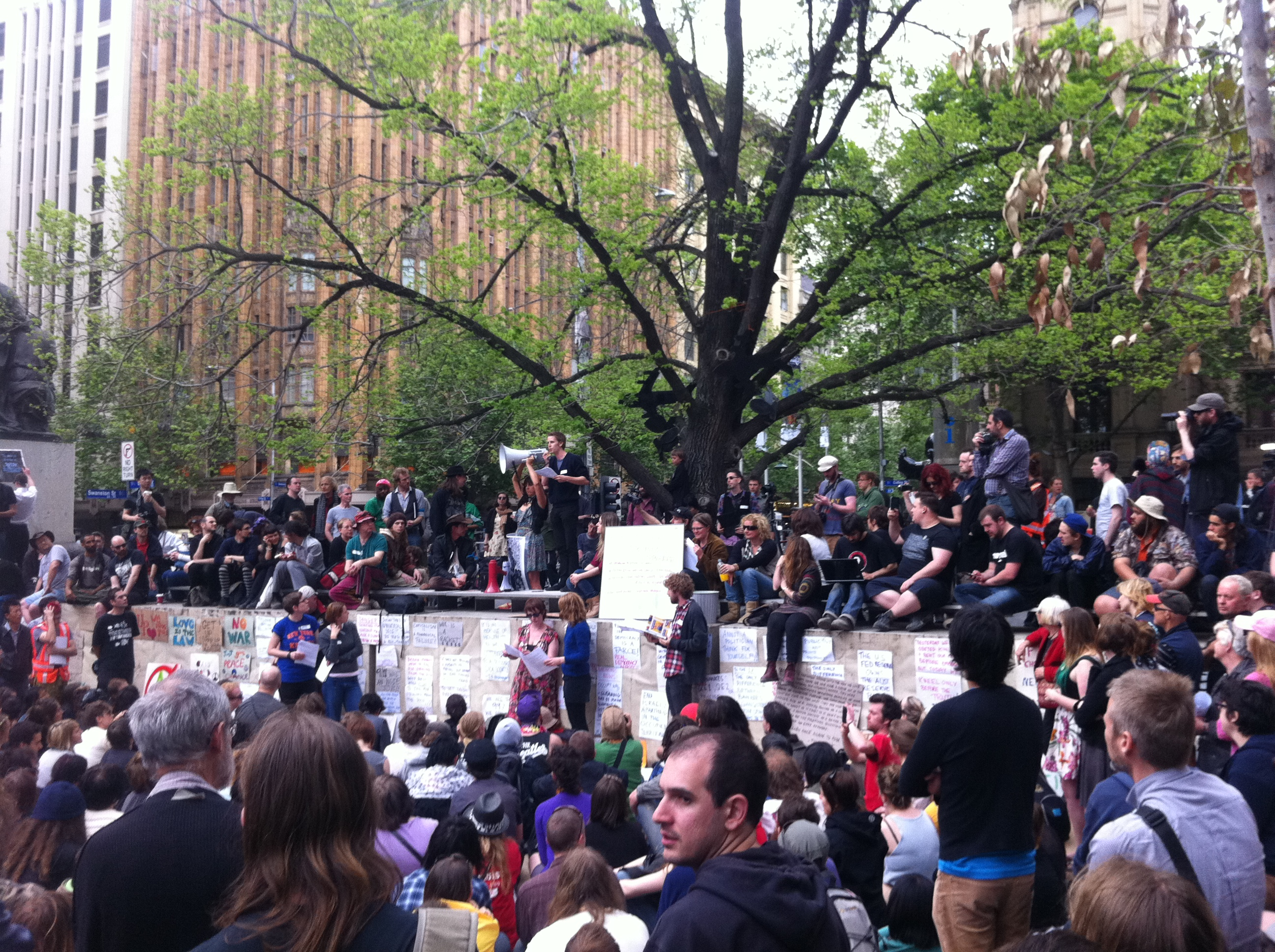
- Occupy Melbourne's First General Assembly, City Square
- Date: 15 October 2011 – 2012
- Location: Melbourne, Victoria, Australia; 37.814158°S 144.976194°E
- Caused by: Economic inequality, corporate influence over government, inter alia.
- Methods: Demonstration, occupation, protest, street protesters
- Result: Nil, several arrests and injuries

Number
- 2,500 at peak (150 sleeping at peak)

Arrests and injuries
- Injuries: 2 police, 43 protesters
- Arrested: 112 (no charges)

Occupy Melbourne was a social movement which took place from late 2011 to mid 2012 in Melbourne, Australia as part of the global Occupy movement Participants expressed grievances concerning economic inequality, social injustice, corruption in the financial sector, corporate greed and the influence of companies and lobbyists on government. Protests began on 15 October 2011 in City Square with a 6-day-long protest encampment, from which people were forcibly evicted by Victoria Police at the request of the City of Melbourne CEO on 21 October 2011. From 2 November 2011, Occupy set up camp in Treasury Gardens before being moved on from that location in December. A significantly diminished number of protesters set up camp at Father Bob's church at his invitation until his retirement in January 2012. Physical manifestations of the movement had largely dissipated by mid-2012 though it adopted a strategy of decentralisation and became influential in the creation of new community networks, affinity groups and collectives.

== History ==
=== City Square encampment ===
In response to a call out of the United States from Occupy Together for global protest encampments in solidarity with Occupy Wall Street, and a call from the Spanish los indignados for a global day of action on 15 October, an Occupy Melbourne Facebook group was started at the end of September by a young non-activist woman living in the suburbs. From this, two organising meetings were held, the first at a venue on Sydney Road in Brunswick, the second at Ross House in Melbourne city. At the second, several working groups were formed, a website launched and plans made to begin a protest encampment at City Square commencing 15 October.

The protest encampment was established at City Square on the afternoon of Saturday 15 October during and following a rally at the site attended by 3,000-5,000 people. Approximately 50 people slept the first night, numbers of people sleeping steadily increased each night. By day 3 most of the infrastructure was established, with power provided by generators donated by passers by. Infrastructure included two large communal sleeping tents, many smaller tents, a media centre, first aid and legal support/observers, indigenous tent, a large undercover gathering space used for art, banner painting, a free school, free library, a free shop, a kids space, a women's space and a large and ever-expanding kitchen in the centre of the square.

Thousands of people came through the encampment each day. General Assemblies were held every evening at 6pm, various working group meetings were held most days. A logistics working group assisted with establishing infrastructure and incoming donations of materials. Most donations were of food and the kitchen was well stocked with several weeks worth of food. Many political discussions were had at the square during the encampment and diverse interactions between people at the encampment and the media. The existence of the encampment jammed the commercial media discourse with discussions about political corruption, corporate greed, economic corruption, the failures of representative democracy, etc., and drew attention to events elsewhere in the world during the Arab Spring, European anti-austerity protests and the Occupy movement globally. Many celebrities visited the encampment and sporadic live streams were run.

=== The "eviction" ===
On the morning of 21 October 2011, one week into the occupation, the City of Melbourne issued a notice to comply with local council bylaws, requesting that protesters remove themselves and their belongings from City Square by 9 am, as council bylaws did not permit camping and "hanging or placing objects and things on or over the city square". Protesters resolved to continue to encampment stating on their website "we remain committed to peacefully occupying public space and intend to remain".

Without consulting councillors, the City of Melbourne CEO sought the assistance of Victoria Police to forcibly remove protesters from City Square. Shortly after 9 am, 300-500 protesters remained in the square. The police operation injured 43 people and 95 were detained temporarily, later released without charge. The resulting milieu drew thousands into the city centre where multiple sit-ins blocked intersections and roads in the city. After 11 hours of rolling sit-ins and defence against police attacks, a crowd of over 1,000 sought refuge in Victorian Trades Hall where an assembly was held. Tram, bus and car traffic in the city centre was significantly disrupted the entire day. In the global context, this was one of the first encampments to be attacked and forcibly removed, thus the shock of the police action was relatively new and surprising.

Adam Bandt, the Member of the Australian Parliament for Melbourne, criticised the decision to remove protesters, saying "Victorian Premier Ted Baillieu and Lord Mayor Robert Doyle have made a huge blunder by sending in the police, turning a week-long non-violent protest into a site of confrontation". Greens councilor Cathy Oke also criticised Melbourne City Council's actions stating "I certainly didn’t endorse this action or decision to bring in riot police and fences to remove peaceful protesters". 95 people were arrested. Two police officers were also injured in the scuffles with one taken to hospital. Occupy Melbourne's legal team issued a statement claiming they had "43 statements detailing shocking injuries inflicted by police on peaceful protestors. These include eye-gouging, punches to the face and back of the head and the deployment of pepper spray, including on children".

Doyle defended his decision to evict the Occupy Melbourne protesters, stating that they were "a self-righteous, narcissistic, self-indulgent rabble tried to capture the city" and that a "hard core of serial and professional protesters" were involved. Doyle later commented "We don't intend to allow people to set up tents anywhere in the city. We have adopted a zero-tolerance policy". Occupy Melbourne called for a public inquiry into the eviction, which Doyle declined. Protesters later took the matter to the Federal Court of Australia suspecting a breach of federal law by Melbourne City Council. The court ultimately found in the council's favour in a 127-page judgement handed down on 1 October 2013, although the court did find that some of the infringement notices issued to protestors were legally invalid.

=== Subsequent encampments ===
Six subsequent protest encampments were established in a pattern whereby local council bylaws were used to impede the right to free assembly and political communication through a regime of issuing notices to comply and heavy-handed police tactics to break up any emerging encampments. These encampments included:

- Victorian State Library lawn

Following the split at RMIT, around 20-30 people maintained a minimal encampment at this location for around one week before a General Assembly decided to move to Treasury Gardens on recommendation of the logistics working group who had conducted a study of viable sites in the city centre.

- Edinburgh Gardens

Some participants used this site outside the city centre in North Fitzroy following the split at RMIT. It was attended by few people and conducted little political activities. It eventually consolidated into a steady collective under the leadership of one or two charismatic individuals before submitting to a City of Yarra request to disband.

- Treasury Gardens

Occupied for the longest of all subsequent encampments, situated next to federal and state treasury and the offices of many politicians. Authorities destroyed a First Nations Embassy and first aid facilities. As numbers of participants lessened, a decision was made to begin a new encampment at Gordon Reserve Triangle in a more prominent location.

- Gordon Reserve Triangle

A highly visible and prominent location between state parliament and state treasury, between several tram lines and next to a major underground rail station. Extensive infrastructure was set up here but few people slept overnight. Those who did were threatened by police and council officers and decided early the following morning to relocate to Flagstaff Gardens. This was a controversial decision that reflected an increasing divide between people who could sleep at the encampment and those who couldn't.

- Flagstaff Gardens

The council and police regime of issuing notices to comply made it impossible to erect any structures at this location and numbers sleeping overnight reduced again. Few people attended during the day except for occasionally General Assemblies which began to lose relevance and there was little pedestrian traffic. This was the location of the famous "tent monsters" action video that spread virally on the internet.

- Saint Peter and Paul Parish

A left-leaning parish priest, Father "Bob" Maguire, offered space to Occupy Melbourne at the Saint Peter and Paul Parish in South Melbourne to provide a permanent location free of police harassment at Flagstaff Gardens. Despite initial excitement and establishing useful office space with computers and areas on site for permanent tents, this location was not used very often and became disused after a few weeks.

During the occupation of Flagstaff Gardens, on 6 December four protesters wore their tents as a practical joke on police that had arrived to evict them. The police forcibly removed the tent from one protester who resisted. The protesters then called for all "Occupy" protesters around the world to wear tents for human rights.

=== Local council elections ===
On 10 August 2012, Mayor Doyle deleted Facebook and Twitter accounts created for his election campaign amid Occupy Melbourne protesters using the pages to post demands for a public enquiry into alleged police violence at the City Square eviction.

== Internal politics ==
The majority of participants in Occupy Melbourne had not participated in such a movement and direct actions prior, however they were supported by many established community campaigners, political organisations and activists. The most dominant political tendency within Occupy Melbourne was a non-aligned, prefigurative, autonomous tendency mostly consisting of young people who had not been involved in activism prior. Other influential tendencies included various anarchist, Marxist and socialist groups. Many Greens members were involved though there was no official party involvement despite public support. Some ALP members were involved. There was a small but vocal faction of libertarian economists. Networks of hacktivists and some suspected association with Anonymous were involved. Marxist and socialist groups had the most influence in the Direct Action working group, many anarchists were involved in first aid, legal, facilitation and kitchen working groups. There were small autonomous collectives of indigenous, women and queer identifying people during the initial protest encampment.

== Involvement in industrial disputes ==
In November 2011, participants from Occupy Melbourne were involved in an industrial dispute at a Baiada chicken plant, which was exploiting the labour and endangering the safety of predominantly southeast Asian women migrants at the plant, some of which were paid as little as $8 per hour, well below the award rate. The dispute involved an ongoing picket of the plant, strikes and other actions, closing the plant for 13 days. It was won by the workers in late November.

A second industrial dispute was ongoing during November 2011, in which Qantas baggage handlers were disputing job cuts, low pay and degrading service safety. Occupy Melbourne was prepared to go to Melbourne Airport to support pickets and direct action, though the dispute never escalated to this level. However, the prospect of the Occupy movement acting in solidarity with Qantas workers shaped the discourse around the dispute.

== Results and influences ==
=== Influence on institutional politics ===
As in many other countries that experienced mass protest movements in the wake of the GFC, Australia, particularly Victoria, has experienced an increase in the number of smaller political parties and independent candidates running in elections at all levels of government. This parallels and increased interest in participation in institutional politics and a growing distrust of established political parties and institutions.

The forced removal of people from City Square triggered an internal debate within the City of Melbourne regarding the powers of the CEO and the Lord Mayor as the eviction from City Square was not endorsed by the councillors. In 2013, Occupy Melbourne participants successfully lobbied City of Melbourne councillors to conduct an investigation into the decisions that led to the eviction from which a timeline of events and documentation was released.

=== Direct democracy in Australia ===
Occupy Melbourne influenced the creation of Real Democracy Australia, which campaigned for direct democracy and considered running a candidate for Mayor in the City of Melbourne in response to events around Occupy Melbourne. As of November 2015, the Real Democracy Australia website is no longer accessible.

=== Influence on the legal system and policing ===
In response to the policing of Occupy Melbourne, the Occupy Melbourne Legal Support Team worked with various community legal centres to publish the report "Occupy Policing" which identified detailed gendered and radicalised policing heavy-handed tactics, excessive use of force and breaches of internal police standards. This publication was influential in the ongoing debate regarding the policing of protests in Victoria.

== Website controversy ==
Since 2013, the website occupymelbourne.net (not to be confused with the original OccupyMelbourne.org) has posted numerous anti-Islam articles including one claiming that there are plans for the erection of large mosques in several suburbs of Melbourne. The website has also posted a number of articles attacking various people involved in Occupy Melbourne, as well as various conspiracy theories. When quoted in the media in early 2014, several participants of Occupy Melbourne distanced themselves from the website, identifying that the .net website spread several ideas that go directly against the ideas that originally motivated the movement.

== See also ==
- Occupy movement
- Occupy Wall Street
- Occupy Sydney
- List of global Occupy movement protest locations
