= Occupy Oslo =

Protest group in Oslo, Norway

Occupy Oslo was a collaboration, peaceful protest and demonstration against social injustice, corporate greed and the influence of corporations and lobbyists on government. It occurred in Oslo, Norway, and started as a part of the global protests of October 15th, 2011. The protest began in solidarity with the Occupy Wall Street protests in New York, United States, and is a part of the global occupy movement.

The movement met every Saturday in Oslo city centre, usually at Eidsvolls plass in front of the Parliament, but sometimes at other sites, such as Spikersuppa and Youngstorget.

Occupy Oslo engaged in organized meetings, events and actions through February 2012.

== See also ==
- List of Occupy movement protest locations
