= Occupy Windsor =

Protest group against economic inequality

- Part of the "Occupy" protests
- Date: October 15, 2011 – December 12, 2011
- Location: Windsor, Ontario
- Caused by: Economic inequality, unemployment, homelessness
- Methods: Demonstration, occupation, protest
- Status: Ended

Number
- Protesters: ~25

Occupy Windsor was an Occupy movement encampment in David Croll Park, Windsor, Ontario, Canada. The protest ended and all protesters evacuated the area on December 12, 2011 with promises to return to the park to reseed areas damaged by the camp.

== Organization ==
There were 25 residents as of November 11, 2011. Meetings were held twice a day. Occupy hand signals were used so that no one's voice was drowned out. Drinking and drugs in the camp were not permitted. Sanitation for the encampment was provided by rented portable toilets and was offered by the nearby All Saints' Church.

== History ==
The Occupy Windsor movement respected the wishes of Armoured Reserve Regiment's 75th anniversary celebrations by delaying the start time of the protests to allow the regiment use of the public space, officially starting the occupation of David Croll Park on October 15. During the protests the city staff of Windsor turned on water sprinklers and soaked the encampment as part of regular maintenance. In support of the Occupy Detroit movement (located across the US-Canada border), 50 people from Occupy Windsor group marched down to the waterfront and offered support.

On December 9, the protesters announced their intention to end the occupation, with one of the protesters stating to the media, "We believe the encampment has served its purpose to make a statement that we have a right to freely assemble and conduct a dialogue [about] the concerns we have about how the political and corporate control over our lives is undemocratic."

After the protest was officially ended on December 12, 2011, four of the protesters expressed their concerns about being homeless to the rest of the group. In response, the group was able to, "with the assistance of the Windsor Police and the city social services department", obtain four apartments for the men to live in until longer term housing could be found. One of the other members involved with getting the apartments stated, "People from Occupy Windsor made a commitment to them. We're going to stay in touch."

While no longer actively occupying, the Occupy Windsor protesters, numbering around 50, protested on December 17, 2011 outside the Windsor city hall in regards to the discussion going on among the city council about "lower tuition rates, improved pension plans, poverty and the Comprehensive Economic Trade Agreement with Europe (CETA)". The protesters have stated that they are no longer going to occupy, but that they "will continue to hold assemblies and marches".

== Response ==
The city and police force both indicated that the Windsor occupiers were generally well behaved and few complaints were registered against them. Mayor Eddie Francis explained that "taking action against a small group of peaceful protestors can lead to bigger problems." Police Chief Gary Smith also stated, "I can't speak for the other agencies that check on safety and that, but nothing's been reported to us that's raised any concerns at this point."

One of the City Councillors, Drew Dilkens, threatened in early November to "lodge a formal complaint about the protesters not abiding by a bylaw requiring them to get a permit to set up tents and stay overnight in a public park." He also made a statement to CBC News, saying, "I think we've been more than tolerant. So, I personally would like to see them gone, because I don't think their message is coherent...They pride themselves on being a leaderless movement, and I've never seen change without leadership...It's an accident waiting to happen. I'd hate for someone to die to get to the point to say, 'We really should have removed them earlier.'"

== See also ==
- List of Occupy movement protest locations
