= Occupy Berlin =

Protest group against economic inequality

- Part of the Occupy movement
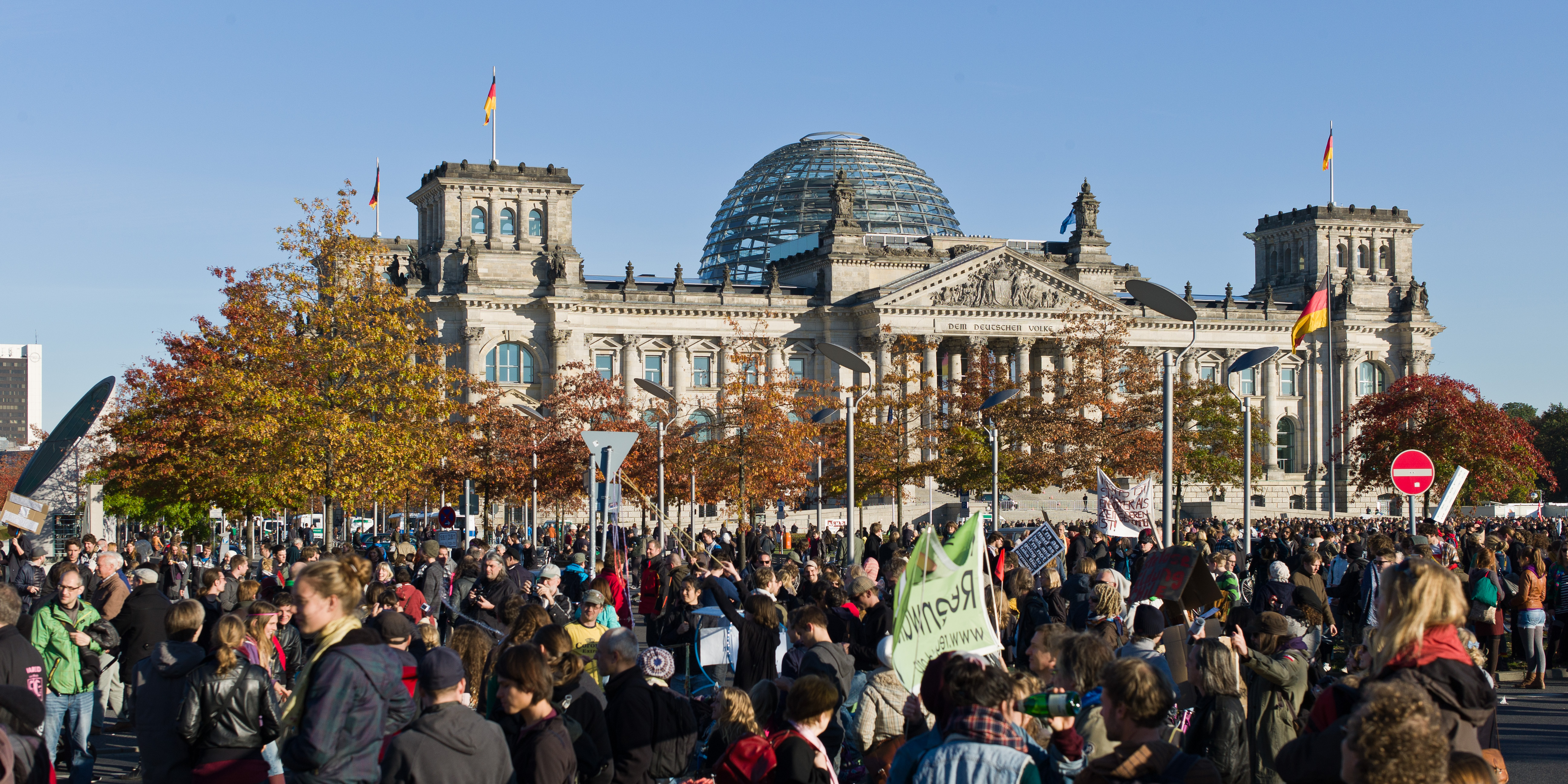
- Stock photo of a typical Berlin Reichstag demonstration
- Date: 15 October 2011 – 2012
- Location: Berlin, Germany
- Caused by: Economic inequality, corporate influence over government
- Methods: Demonstration, occupation, protest, street protesters

Occupy Berlin was a collaboration in Berlin, Germany that has included peaceful protests and demonstrations against unregulated financial markets and other alleged social injustices. It began as a part of the 15 October 2011 global protests. The protest began in solidarity with the Occupy Wall Street protests in New York, United States. It has established three encampments: outside the church Parochialkirche, in Boxhagener Platz and the biggest one on the Bundespressestrand.

Occupy Berlin cooperates with similar movements throughout Germany, most notably from Frankfurt and Hamburg.

As of June 2012, Occupy Berlin had continued to engage in organized meetings, events and actions.

== See also ==
- List of Occupy movement protest locations
