= Occupy Reykjavík =

Socio-political movement in Iceland

Coordinates: 64.14°N 21.90°W

- Part of the Occupy movement
- Date: From 15 October 2011
- Location: Reykjavík, Iceland
- Caused by: Economic inequality, corporate influence over government, inter alia.
- Methods: Demonstration, occupation, protest, street protesters

Occupy Reykjavík (OR) was a collaboration that included peaceful protests and demonstrations against economic inequality, social injustice and corporate greed in Reykjavík, Iceland.

== Protests ==
The general protest on 1 October 2011 was linked to the Occupy Wall Street protests in New York, United States. However, this protest coincided with opening of the autumn session of the parliament and concerned the slow pace of recovery from the Icelandic financial crisis.

An actual occupation of a public square began on 15 October 2011, linked to the worldwide Occupy movement. On 30 October 2011, the police removed the main tent of the protesters in the Austurvöllur square in front of the Icelandic parliament, Althingi.

== Influence ==
The Occupy Reykjavík protests were noticeable but small. Prior to the OR protests, the intense Iceland Kitchenware Revolution took place in late 2008 and early 2009, followed by the National Assembly of 2009 and the Icelandic Constitutional Assembly of 2010 and 2011.

== See also ==
- List of Occupy movement protest locations
