= Anti-austerity movement in Portugal =

Political movement

- Part of the European sovereign debt crisis
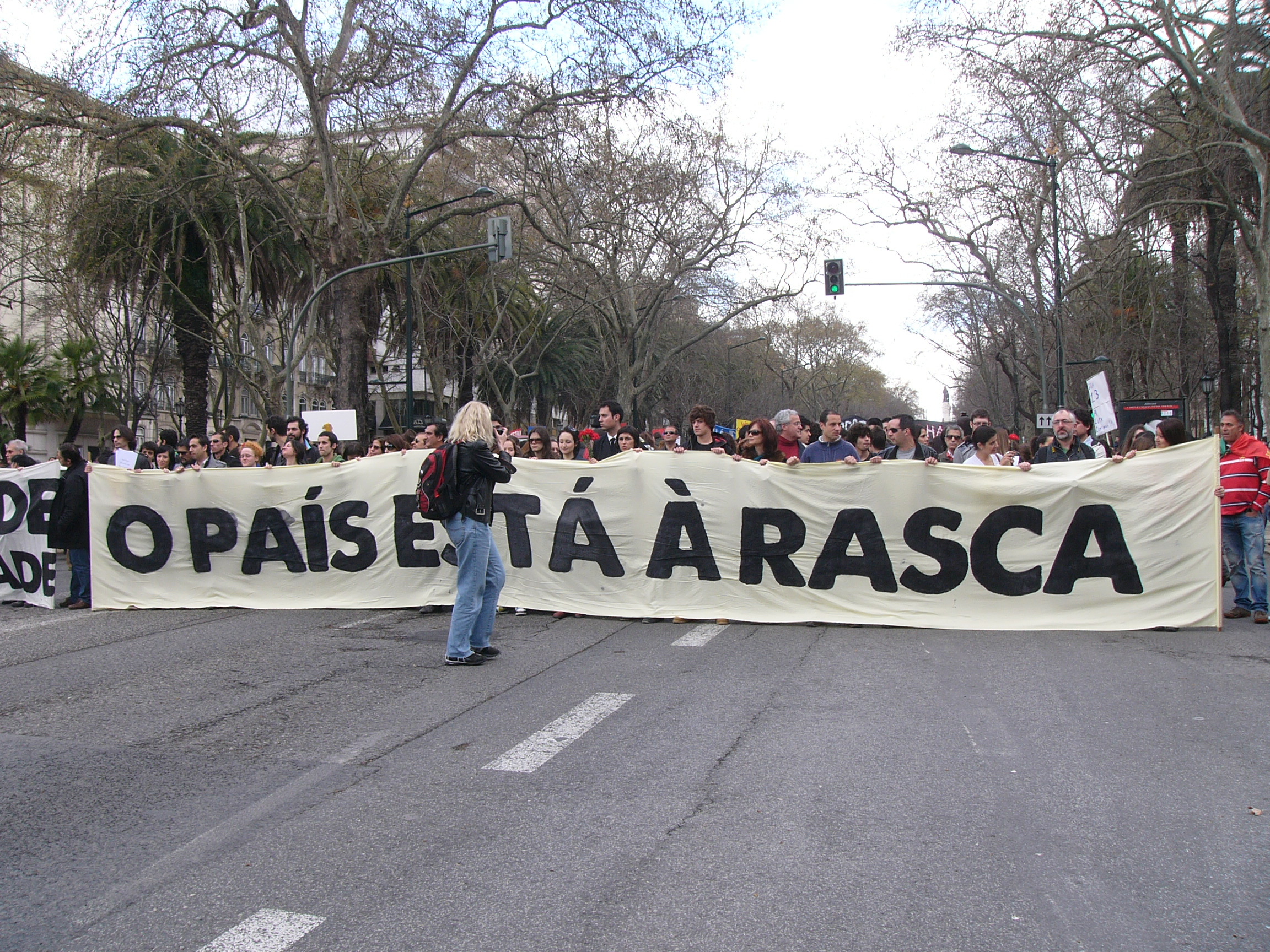
- Top of the demonstration in Lisbon
- Date: 12 March 2011 – 15 October 2011 (7 months and 3 days)
- Location: Portugal
- Caused by: Austerity
- Methods: Demonstrations, occupations, rioting

The 12 March Movement (Portuguese: Movimento 12 de Março) or the Geração à Rasca (Portuguese: [ʒɛɾɐˈsɐ̃w a ˈʁaʃkɐ], "struggling generation") protest took place in more than 10 cities of Portugal against the economic crisis and labour rights. They were the biggest events since the 1974 Carnation Revolution and organized without support from political parties or trades unions.

A Facebook event and a blog, created by a group of friends—Alexandre de Sousa Carvalho, João Labrincha and Paula Gil—were the starting point.

== Background ==
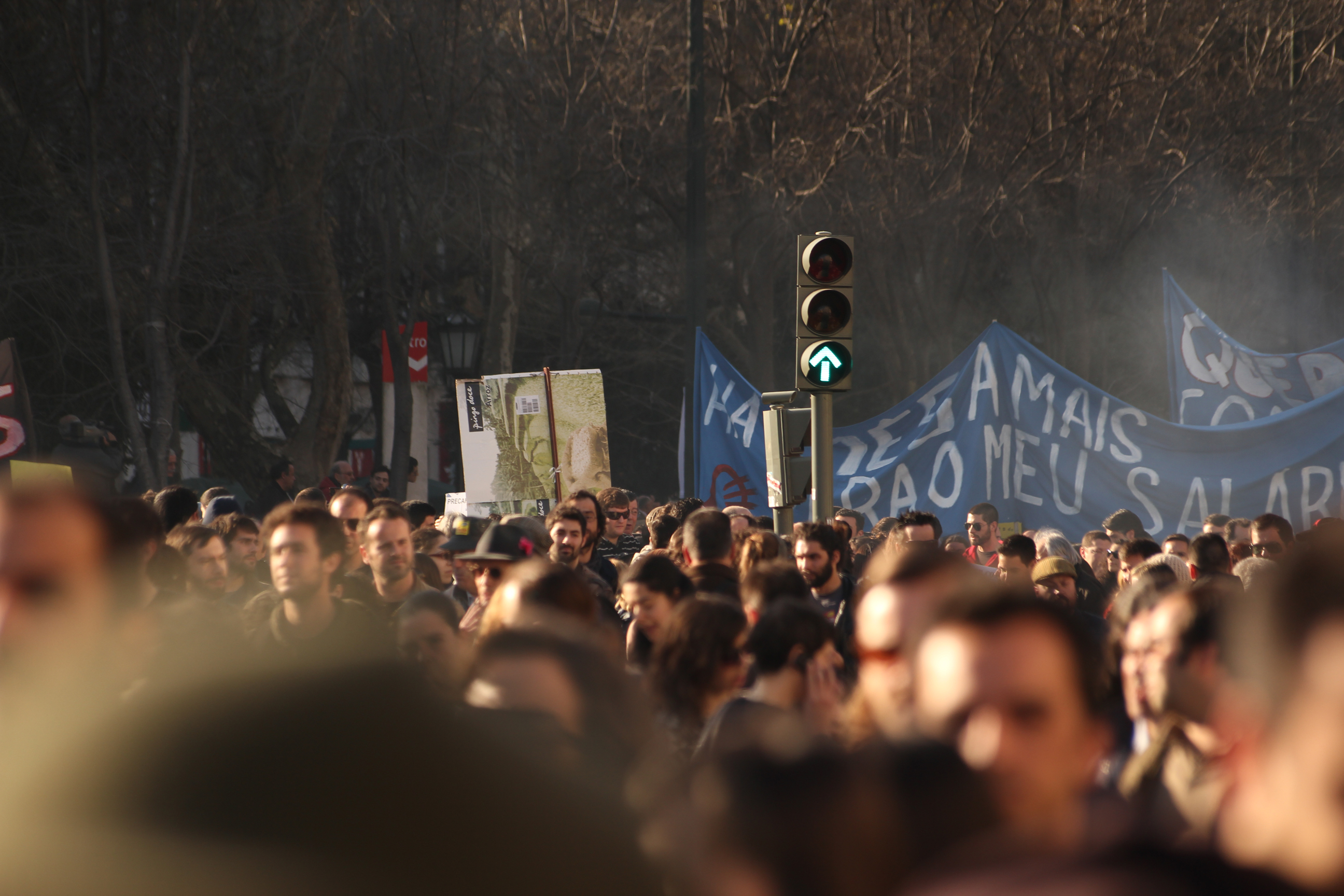
Protests in Lisbon

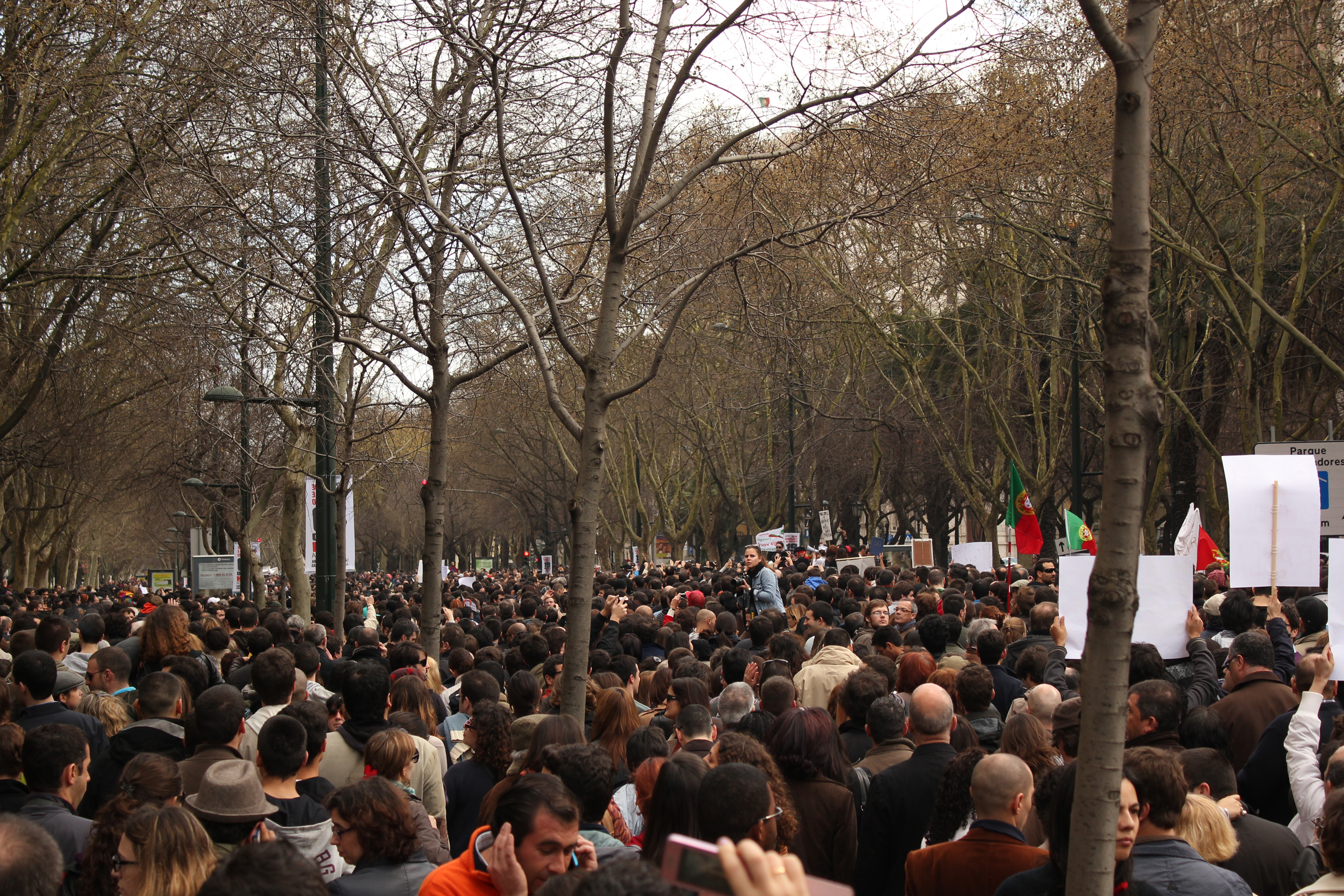
Protests in Lisbon

A number of musical acts in Portugal had been involved in protest actions against the austerity measures at the beginning of the crisis. Music addressing Portugal's political situation became a part of local and national political protest narratives, which found music playing an important role in protests in Portugal—as they have since the Portuguese Revolution culminating in the 25 April coup in 1974.

Among this music was traditional Portuguese music and instruments including gaitas, flutes, rhythm sections, and brass music. The organizers of Geração a Rasca put out a general call for musicians to appear in the procession, and also included personal invitations to some of the musical acts to perform.

Various protest songs addressing the precarious situation in Portugal during the crisis were performed in Portugal. Deolinda's song "Parva Que Sou", which talks about precarious working conditions for Portuguese youth, in particular qualified university graduates, became an inspiration for some of the protesters.

Other inspiration for the protests came from Homens da Luta, a comedian duo who won the Festival da Canção with a song about the "joy of the struggle", emulating social protests of the 1960s.

== Gatherings ==
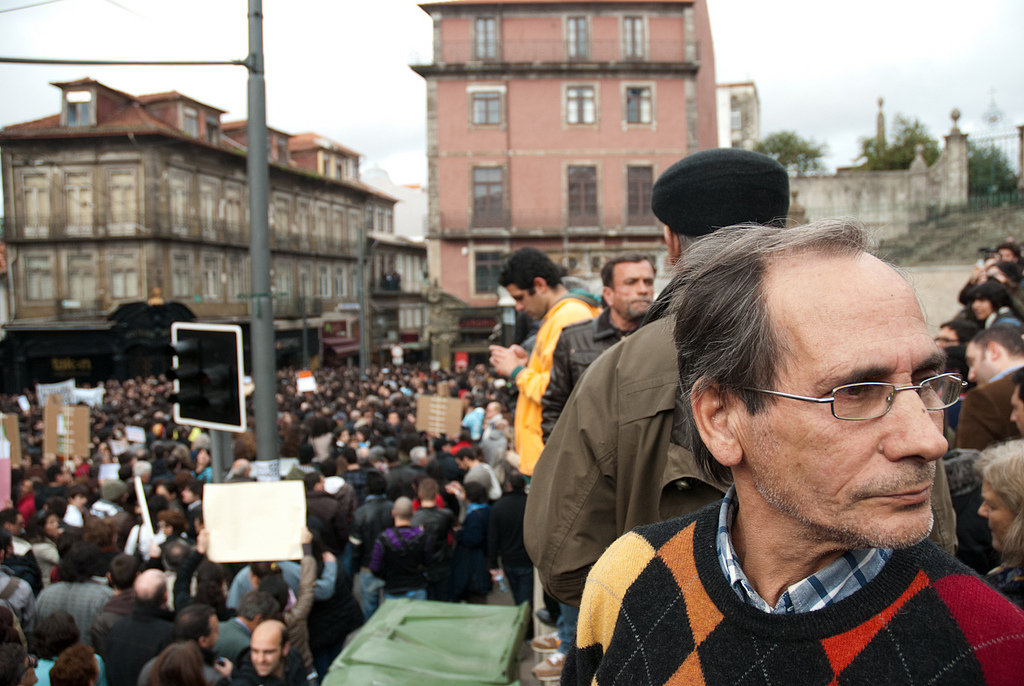
A gathering in Porto

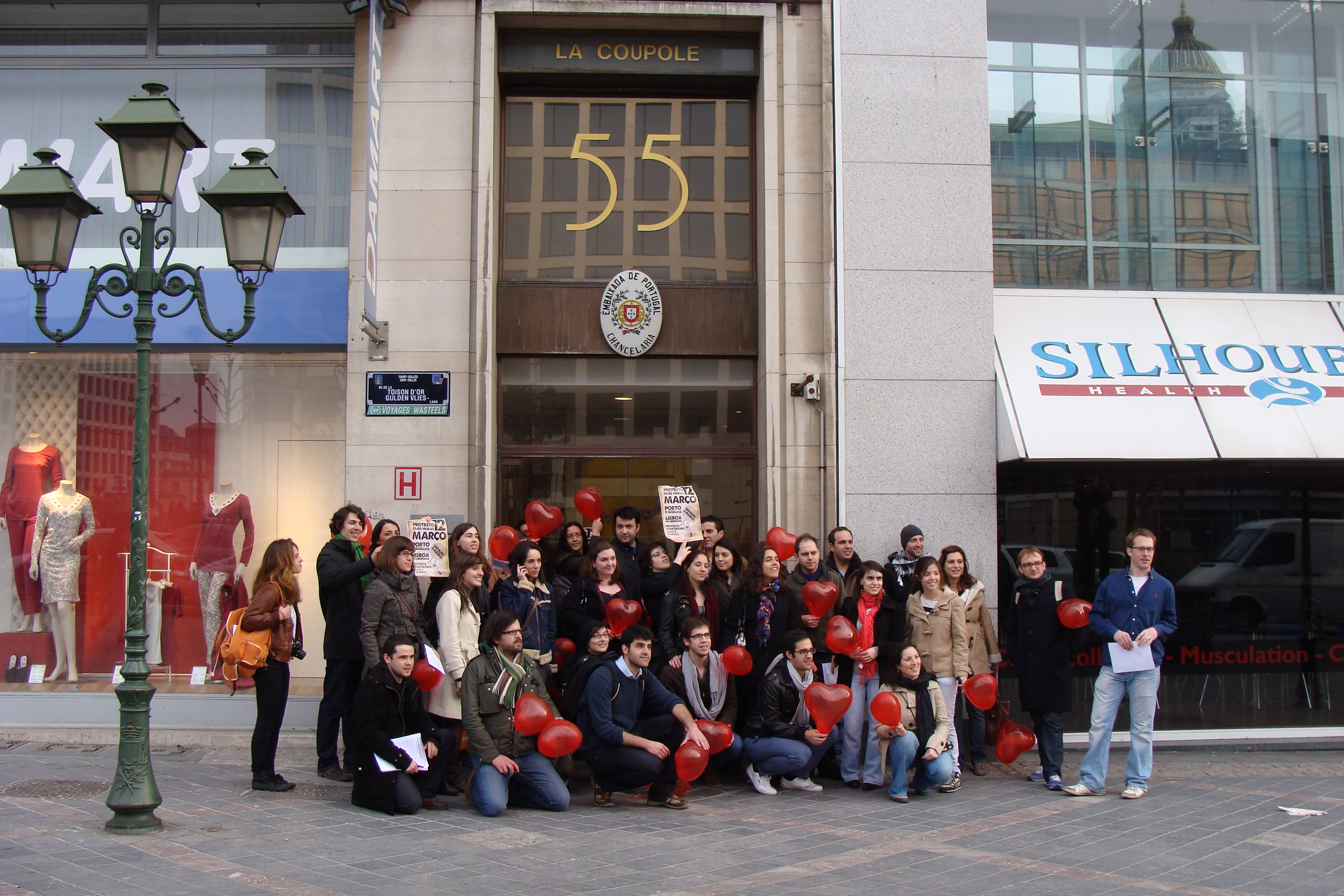
A gathering in Brussels, Belgium

Around 300,000 people gathered on 12 March 2011 in Porto and Lisbon alone. Events also occurred in several other Portuguese cities, including Funchal, Ponta Delgada, Viseu, Braga, Castelo Branco, Coimbra, Faro, Guimarães and Leiria. Several Portuguese emigrants also gathered in front of the embassies of their countries of residence to protest in Barcelona, London, Berlin, The Hague, Madrid, Lubliana, Luxemburg, Brussels, Maputo, New York, Copenhagen and Stuttgart.

== Impact ==
Spain's May demonstrations were influenced by the Portuguese events, which in turn incited new activity in Portugal.

On 23 March 2011, the prime minister José Sócrates resigned when new austerity measures failed to pass in the Parliament.

On 15 April 2011, the initial organizers of the Geração à Rasca protest created the 12 March Movement. This small group of young people gathered with other activists to create a movement with the objective to "Make every citizen a politician", a sentence from the Portuguese Nobel Prize winner José Saramago. They promised to be an active voice promoting democracy in all areas" of their lives".

Over 80,000 people marched in Lisbon as part of a 15 October global day of protest against the usual suspects. Hundreds broke through a police cordon around the parliament in Lisbon to occupy its broad marble staircase, where a popular assembly took place. About 20,000 people also rallied in Porto, Portugal's second biggest city.

The 12 March Movement, as others created after the Geração à Rasca protest, is still very active in several political and civic actions. After the demonstration "people discovered that they have 'a voice', they are more conscientious and more aware to political issues". Civil "society [is] more alive and awakened".

== See also ==
- List of protests in the 21st century
