= The Occupied Times of London =

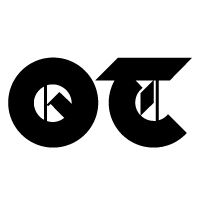
- Type: Quarterly newspaper
- Format: Broadsheet
- Editor: The OT Collective
- Founded: 26 October 2011
- Ceased publication: 2017
- Political alignment: Autonomist
- Language: English
- Website: www.theoccupiedtimes.org

The Occupied Times of London was a political newspaper which originated from Occupy LSX in 2011. Originally produced from the occupations at St. Paul’s and Finsbury Square, the paper included news, features and interviews. It was a free, non-profit publication without any advertising and was first published on Wednesday 26 October 2011.

The founding editor of the Occupied Times was Steven Maclean who started the newspaper from a tent at the St.Pauls Occupy protest.

The design of the Occupied Times of London incorporated Jonathan Barnbrook's 'Bastard' font, with a signature back-page placard design or slogan in each issue.

The last issue was Issue 29 March 2017 before it became Base Magazine.
