= Occupy Sydney =

Protest group against economic inequality

- Part of the "Occupy" protests
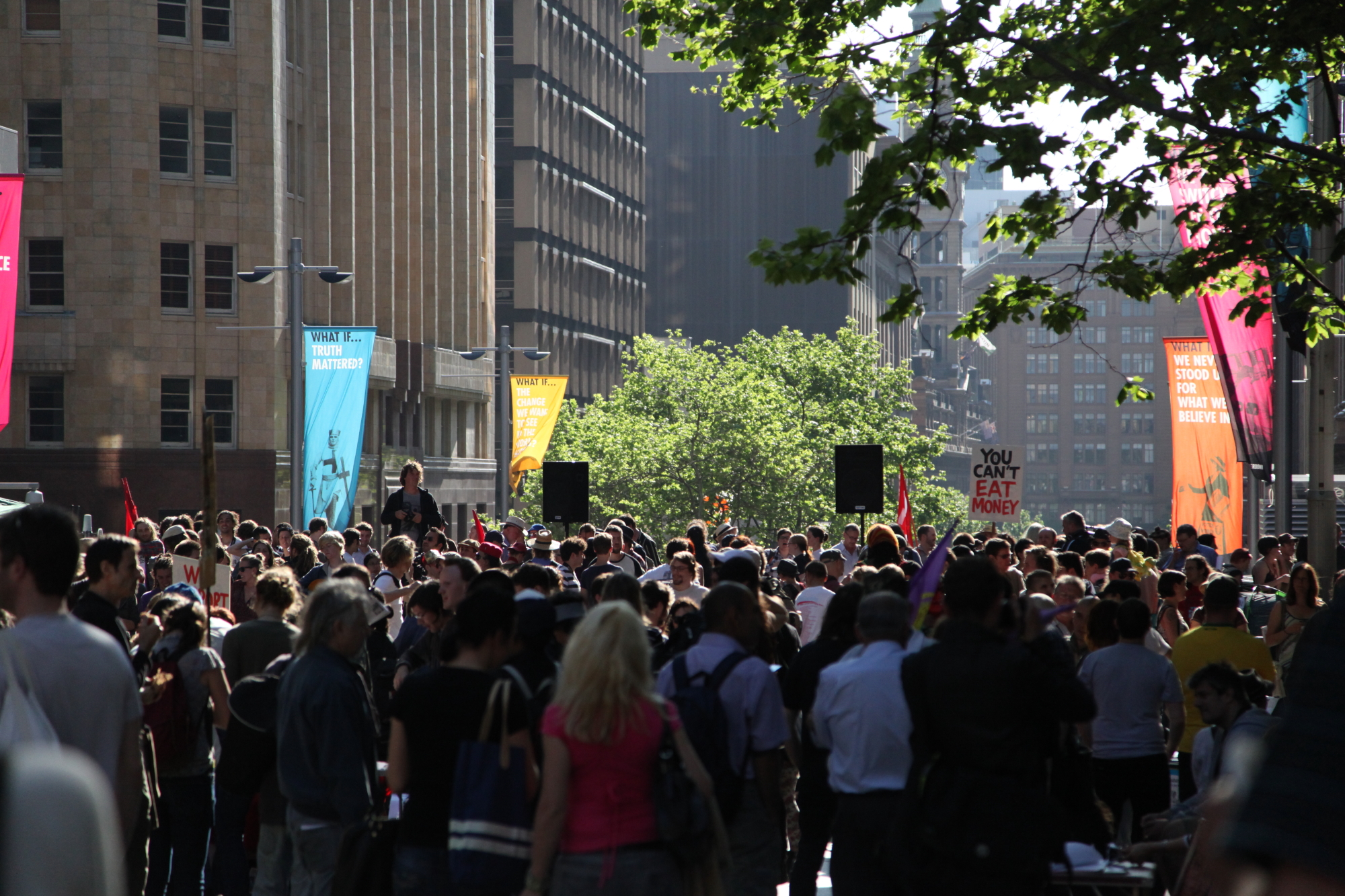
- Crowds gathered in Martin Place for Occupy Sydney, October 2011
- Date: 15 October 2011 – 2013
- Location: Sydney, New South Wales, Australia
- Caused by: Economic inequality, corporate influence over government, housing affordability inter alia
- Methods: Demonstration, occupation, protest, street protesters

Number
- Up to 3,000 at peak (100 sleeping at peak)

Judicial response
- Arrested: 91
- Charged: 45
- Fined: 45 (30 for breaching local government acts)

Occupy Sydney was a social movement and protest as part of the global Occupy movements, in Sydney, Australia. The occupation began on 15 October 2011 outside the Reserve Bank of Australia in Martin Place. The Martin Place occupation was first evicted by NSW Police on 23 October 2011. This eviction and later police action was named Operation Goulding. Another eviction attempt occurred on 2 February 2012. The protest site was removed five times in early July 2013, only to re-establish itself each time within hours.

== Overview ==
Some of the major themes common to the protests included economic inequality, the alleged assault upon civil liberties at the hands of government and law enforcement, social injustice, corruption in the financial sector, corporate greed, and the influence of companies and lobbyists on government. Other issues that past and current participants have expressed include concerns with free assembly in public spaces, housing affordability and homelessness in Sydney, the treatment of Australia's indigenous people, and policies regarding the acceptance of asylum-seekers and refugees. Some within the Occupy movement (Sydney and abroad) have also espoused conspiratorial viewpoints.

== Rallies ==
The largest rally took place on 5 November 2011 through Sydney's central business district (CBD). During the Form 1 process some protesters had agreed to cease the rally by 4:30 pm, however this decision did not represent the views of many of the other participants. Due to a number of reasons, including the large numbers of police assembled at Martin Place, the crowd made the decision to move to Hyde Park, where they remained until they were evicted by police. The movement then re-established itself at Martin Place, where it has remained for the last two years.

== Elections ==
Glenn Wall of Occupy Sydney ran as an independent candidate at the 2012 Sydney by-election. He finished fourth out of five candidates, receiving 2.2 percent of the vote. The seat was won by independent candidate Alex Greenwich.

== Evictions and Occupy Sydney responses ==
=== NSW Police-initiated eviction attempts and arrests ===
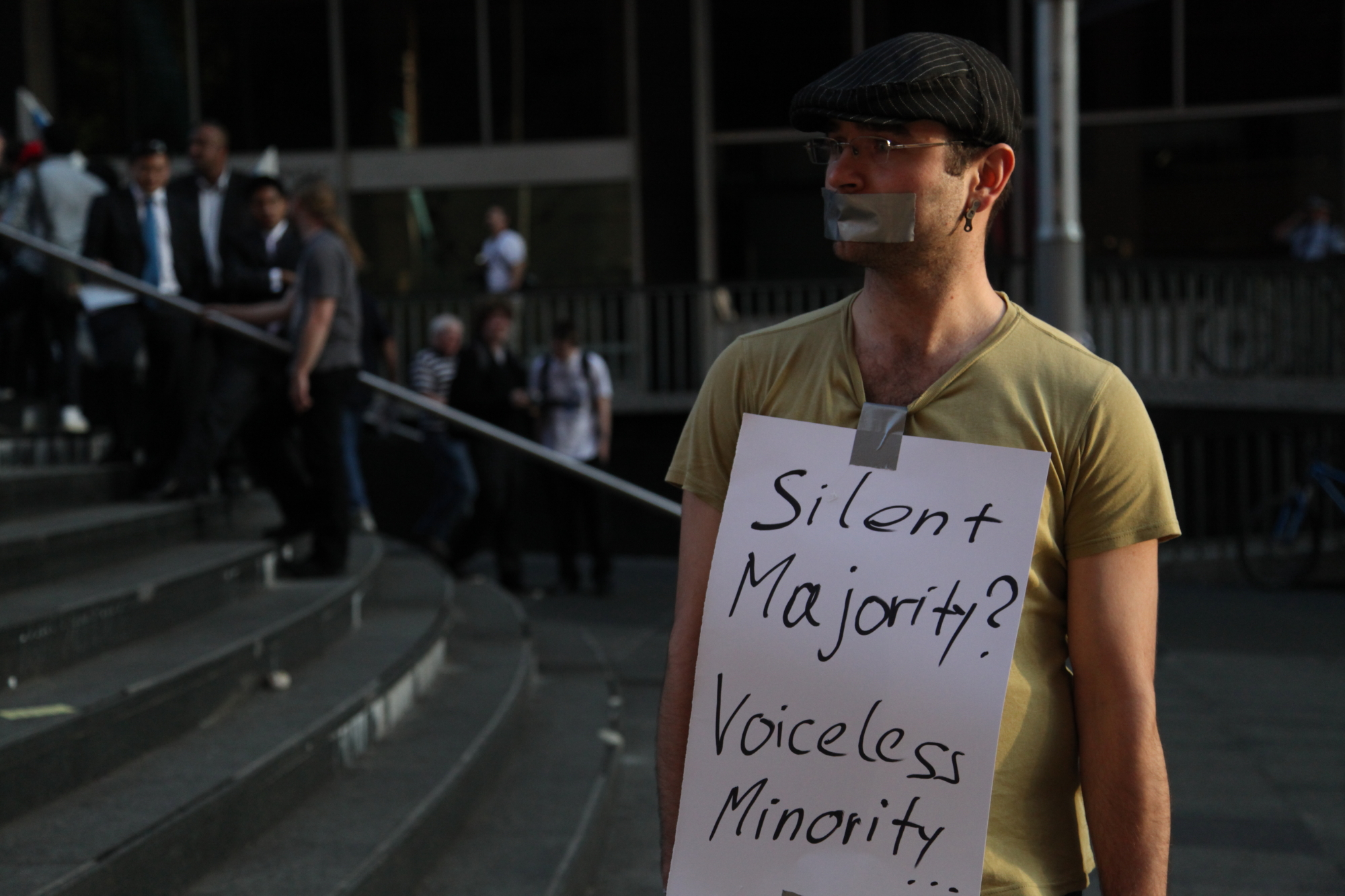
Occupy Sydney protester, October 2011

On the morning of Sunday 23 October 2011, more than 100 police led by Assistant Commissioner Mark Murdoch forcibly removed about 80 protesters, with some protesters claiming that excessive force was used. The police and the New South Wales government defended the level of force, while Clover Moore, the Lord Mayor of Sydney, expressed concern about the violence, saying: "The city respects the right of people to protest". This eviction and later police action was named Operation Goulding.

The Occupy Sydney response to this eviction was supported by Councillor Irene Doutney's motion put to the City of Sydney Council, to allocate Occupy Sydney a permanent protest space. The Occupy Sydney General Assembly agreed to not attempt a full re-occupation pending the 7 November 2011 Council meeting, where this motion would be heard. An Occupy General Assembly was called to immediately follow the Council meeting. During the interim, some Occupiers maintained a daily physical presence. Police also guarded the Occupation site 24 hours a day, seven days a week.

Following the adverse 7 November 2011 Council decision, a small group of Occupiers autonomously re-established the Occupation amidst a heavy police presence. Upon news of a re-occupation occurring, resources flowed back into Occupy Sydney. The General Assembly later endorsed this Occupation.

In another eviction attempt on 2 February 2012, seven people were arrested and a significant amount of property was seized. Despite media reports at the time that declared the end of the occupation, protesters maintained a continuous presence at the site.

On 15 February 2012, seven Occupy activists were arrested following a protest held outside the Greek consulate in Sydney City, over austerity measures. Of the seven, five were released without charge and two were charged with public mischief. Both of these individuals later escaped conviction.

=== Sydney City Council-initiated eviction attempts ===
The first council-initiated eviction attempt on the Occupy Sydney protest in Martin Place was at 7.30 p.m. on 3 July 2013. Occupiers returned on the same evening by 8.30 p.m. The site was also removed on 5 July 2013 (twice) at 9.30 a.m. and 4.00 p.m.; 7 July 2013 at 6.00 p.m.; and 9 July 2013 at 8.30 a.m.

On 3 February 2014 an Occupy Sydney participant won a stay of proceedings http://www.jdbarrister.com.au/images/menu/Priestley%20Court%20of%20Appeal.pdf against the NSW Director of Public Prosecutions who on the instructions of NSW Premier Barry O'Farrell had appealed an earlier dismissal of a charge of camping and staying overnight.

== See also ==
- List of global Occupy movement protest locations
