= 15 October 2011 global protests =

Series of protests

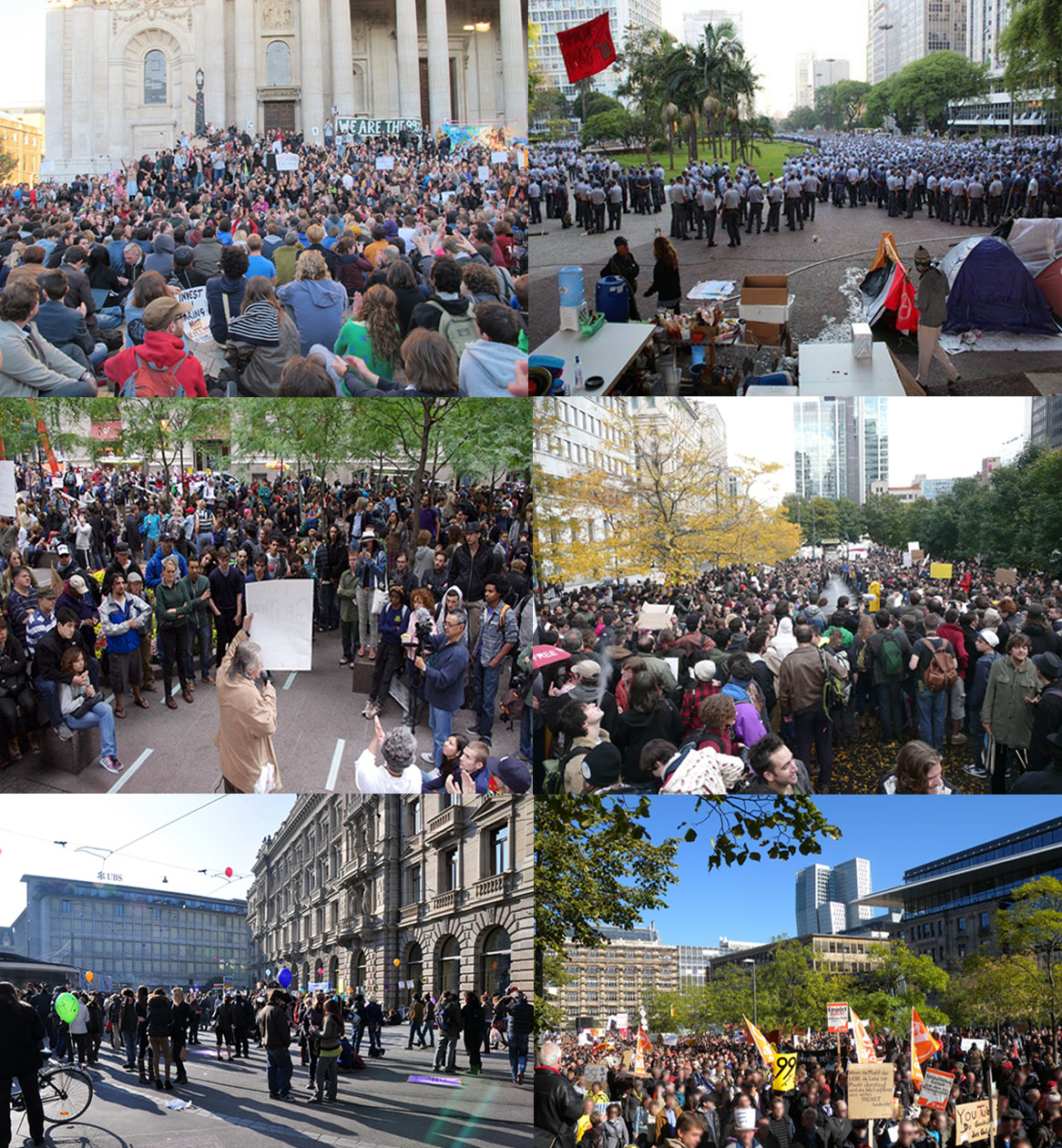
- Date: 15 October 2011; 15 years ago
- Location: Worldwide
- Caused by: Economic inequality, corporate influence over government, political corruption
- Methods: Non violent protest; Civil disobedience; Occupation; Picketing; Demonstrations; Internet activism; Rioting

Casualties and losses
- Arrests: 950+ Injuries: 135+

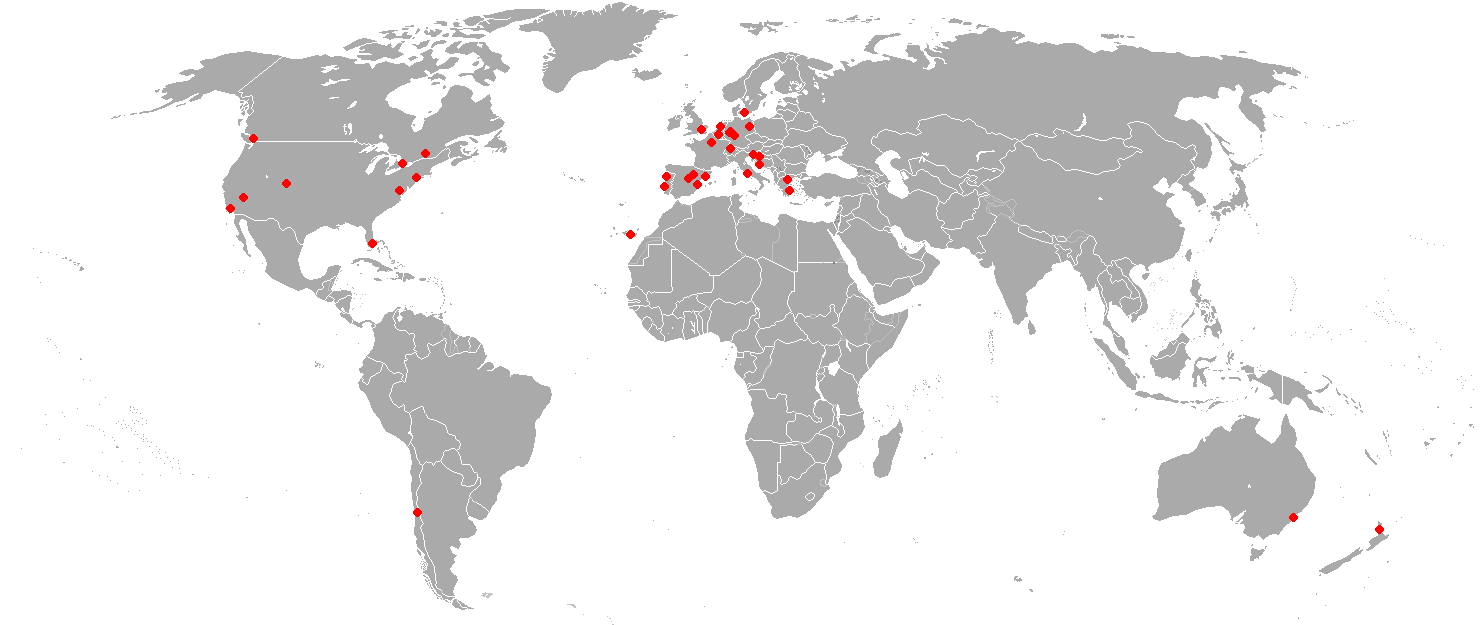
Locations with related protests of over 1000 people

The 15 October 2011 global protests were part of a series of protests inspired by the Arab Spring, the Icelandic protests, the Portuguese "Geração à Rasca", the Spanish "Indignants", the Greek protests, and the Occupy movement. The protests were launched under the slogan "United for #GlobalChange", to which the slogan "United for Global Democracy" was added by many people's assemblies. The protest was first called for by the Spanish Plataforma ¡Democracia Real YA! in May 2011 and endorsed by people's assemblies across the world. Reasons were varied but mainly targeted growing economic inequality, corporate influence over government and international institutions, and the lack of truly democratic institutions allowing direct public participation at all levels, local to global. Global demonstrations were held on 15 October in more than 950 cities in 82 countries. The date was chosen to coincide with the 5-month anniversary of the first protest in Spain. General assemblies, the social network n-1, mailing lists, Mumble voice chat, open pads such as Pirate Pad and Titan Pad, and Facebook were used to coordinate the events. Some protests were only a few hundred in number, whereas others numbered in the hundreds of thousands, with the largest in Madrid numbering half a million and the second largest city Barcelona with 400,000.

== Protests ==
=== Europe ===
==== Brussels ====
The March to Brussels travelled north for five months after leaving Madrid on Thursday May 19. It met with the Barcelona March for a series of protests, the largest being in La Place de Bastille on September 17. After which they continued to travel north, arriving in Brussels in the days prior to the Global protests and occupied an abandoned university building where International activists gathered for a week until the day of the Global Protest when more than a 15,000 people took to the streets in Brussels.

==== Spain ====
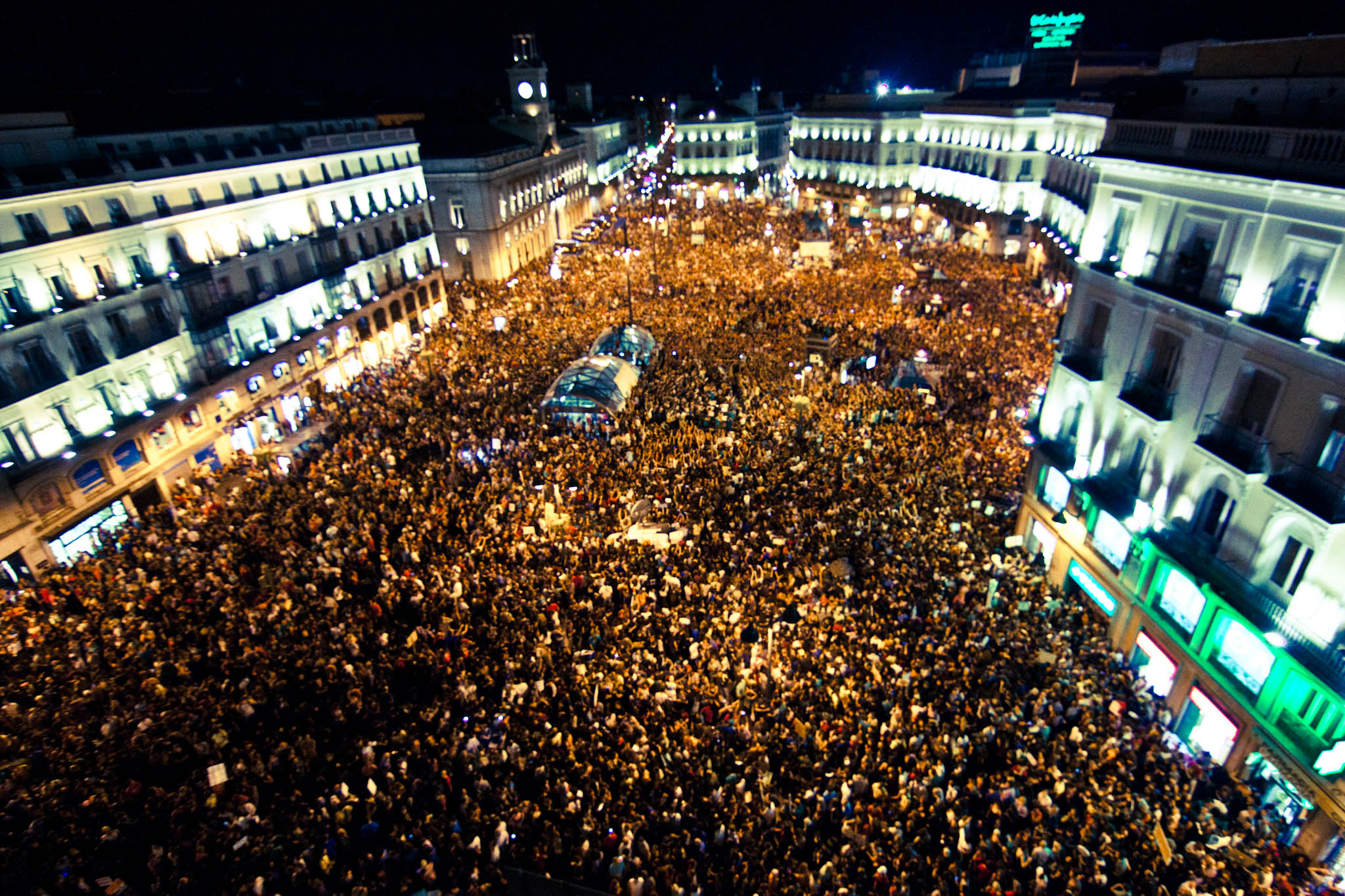
Puerta del Sol square in Madrid after the demonstration on 15 October

As a continuation of the 2011 Spanish Protests, the largest protests took place in Spain, where more than a million people took the streets on 15 October, including 500,000 in Madrid, 400,000 in Barcelona, and 150,000 in Zaragoza. In Madrid, protesters reoccupied the Puerta del Sol square where the Indignados had camped five months earlier on 15 May. As in protests elsewhere, slogans on signs included "We are the 99%", "United for Global Change" and "Human Rights for Everybody".

==== Italy ====
At least 300,000 under the banner of "People of Europe: Rise Up!" gathered in the centre of Rome, according to the organizers. During the peaceful march against corporate greed and austerity measures, a group of people broke away from the main demonstration and threw rocks, bottles and incendiary devices at banks and riot police. Riot police charged and clashed with the protesters repeatedly, firing water cannons and tear gas. At least 135 people were injured, including 105 police officers. Twelve people were arrested.

==== United Kingdom ====
In what became known as Occupy London, 5,000 people gathered outside the London Stock Exchange, ending up setting a camp that remained there for three months. In the following weeks, camps were set up in dozens of cities across the UK.

==== Germany ====
===== Berlin =====
At the Neptune Fountain in Alexanderplatz, 10,000 people gathered between 13:00 and 14:00. At 14:00 the march set off towards the Brandenburg Gate (Brandenburger Tor), arriving at a police barrier at the Pariser Platz square at about 15:00. The march thus made a detour around Brandenburger Tor and marched towards the Kanzleramt, the seat of the federal government of Germany. In front of the Kanzleramt, an open microphone was put in place where anybody could come up and give their thoughts. The sound system was not loud enough for such a big gathering and so it was proposed to use the human microphone (das menschliche Megaphone in German) technique of Occupy Wall Street. The plan had been for everyone to go to Mariannenplatz in the evening where stages, music and food had been prepared. However the people spontaneously decided to assemble in front of the Reichstag and held an assembly there. Tents were put out, and the food was brought from Mariannenplatz. The police came and told the people to disperse. The people refused to disperse and continued their assembly using the human mic. The police then proceeded to destroy the tents which had been put up. After all the tents had been destroyed or confiscated by the police, the police made rounds around the assembly and stole the blankets and mats of the people. At around midnight the police made a final call to disperse and threatened serious consequences for those who stayed. The people decided to stay. The police then proceeded to violently and forcibly remove the peaceful gathering of people in the park in front of the parliamentarian. The police then told the dislodged people on the streets around Platz der Republik to go to Brandenburgertor. More than 100 people then regrouped at Pariserplatz near Brandenburgertor to make a new assembly. In that assembly it was decided to come back the next day at 13:00 at Pariserplatz to continue the movement. As soon as this decision was made, the police made renewed threats to the people. The people then decided to leave for the moment and come back the next day. People from the protest reported that the police blocked sms and Twitter communication containing certain key words such as "occupyreichtag" or "occupywallst" during periods of the day. The protest became ongoing and continues as Occupy Berlin.

===== Frankfurt =====
In Frankfurt, Germany, where 8000 people gathered in front of the European Central Bank Frankfurt headquarters on the first day of a worldwide protest against income disparity and corporate greed. Organizers declared they would occupy and blockade the square in front of the ECB "for an undefined period of time." Demonstrators set up a protest camp like those in Madrid and New York with 109 tents and nine pavilions, soup kitchen and bread line, facilities, generators, W-Lan and live stream and a media team with its own podcast called Klargestellt (German for clarified).

===== Stuttgart =====
Around 5000 people supported the global protest at the "schlossplatz"

===== Hamburg =====
Between 2000 and 5000 people joined the rally on 15 October. A protest camp with currently around 15 tents (as of 22 October 2011) was located in front of the HSH Nordbank headquarters.

==== Cyprus ====
A small number of Greek and Turkish Cypriot activists gathered in Eleftheria Square in Nicosia as a response to the global call for a protest. Through discussion, they decided to move their protest to the buffer zone located in the Ledra/Lokmacı street. This started the Occupy Buffer Zone movement in Cyprus. The movement had a strong focus on the Cyprus Dispute and its relation to the economic status quo.

==== United Kingdom ====
A group of protesters organized an occupation of the London Stock Exchange to bring attention to what they see as unethical behavior on the part of banks. By 2:30 pm, police had contained the crowd near St. Paul's Cathedral, where Wikileaks founder Julian Assange held a speech, stating that Wikileaks would support the protests through a campaign against financial institutions. A similar protest group inspired by Occupy Wall Street has formed in the UK under the name OccupyLSX. Protestors also marched through Edinburgh and formed a tented encampment on St Andrew's Square to kick off Occupy Edinburgh.

==== Ireland ====
In Ireland protests were held throughout the country, including in Dublin and Cork. Now the demonstrations are spreading to Galway as described by The Irish Times. In the same article this newspaper describes the movement in the following terms: The group has no hierarchical structure, has set up a Facebook page and Twitter account – with the social media links attracting a very mixed, and sometimes critical, reaction. The protest in Dublin was organized by the Real Democracy Now! Ireland, Causes United (Ireland) & Occupy Dame Street protest, set up outside the Central Bank of Ireland in solidarity with the Occupy Wall Street movement in New York, also continued throughout the day.

==== Slovenia ====
In Slovenia protesters gathered in Koper, Maribor and the capital, Ljubljana, with the latter being the most prominent one. In Koper around 300 people gathered to protest against corruption, capitalism and also against Port of Koper, which is accused of violation of workers' rights. In the capital, people gathered on Congress Square to protest against greed, corruption and capitalism in general. They later moved to Ljubljana Stock Exchange where an assembly was called. The participants decided to continue the protest by means of symbolic occupation. In the following days, the camp size had risen to some 30 tents with continuing assemblies averaging between 150 and 200 participants, before ceasing in early 2012.

==== Finland ====
In Finland there were gatherings at 13 locations. The largest meeting was held at the Narinkkatori square in Helsinki where about 1000 people attended during the day, according to the organizers. Several hundred people gathered also in Turku, Tampere and Jyväskylä.

==== Hungary ====
In Hungary there were demonstrations at two cities. A gathering with an assembly and marching was held in the capitol Budapest where about 1500 people attended during the day, according to the police and organizers. Several dozen people gathered also in Pécs.

=== North America ===
==== United States ====
On 15 October many local offshoots of Occupy Wall Street started, mainly in smaller cities. Most of the big cities already had Occupy movements that people from the smaller cities and towns came to.

In New York City, after police prepared to evict protesters from Zuccotti Park near Wall Street, the protesters marched into the heart of the city where they gathered 10,000 supporters. 76 were arrested, 45 in Times Square and 24 at a branch of Citibank. Protests also took place in hundreds of major cities across the US such as Washington, Boston, Philadelphia, San Francisco, Los Angeles, Chicago, Miami, and Dallas and smaller communities like Champaign–Urbana, Memphis Oklahoma City, Buffalo, and Fort Lauderdale.

=== Latin America ===
Protests were organized in dozens of cities, including in Chile, Brazil, Peru and Mexico.

=== Middle East and North Africa ===
Protests were organized in dozens of cities and countries, including in Egypt, Tunisia and Israel.

== Arrests ==
=== United States ===
In Boston 100 were arrested, 76 in New York, 175 in Chicago, 50 in Phoenix, 19 in Sacramento, 20 in Raleigh, and 24 in Denver.

=== Italy ===
There were 12 arrests in Rome after a part of the protest turned violent.

== List of gatherings by city ==
Country	City	Estimated attendance		Reference
Country	City	(lower)	(upper)	Reference
Spain	Madrid	500,000		
Italy	Rome	200,000	400,000	
Spain	Valencia	100,000		
Spain	Barcelona	60,000	350,000	
Spain	Zaragoza	40,000		
United States	New York City	35,000	50,000	
Portugal	Lisbon	20,000	100,000	
Chile	Santiago	10,000	100,000	
Portugal	Porto	10,000	20,000	
Spain	Granada	10,000	15,000	
Germany	Berlin	10,000		
Belgium	Brussels	6,000	7,000	
Croatia	Zagreb	5,000	10,000	
United States	Chicago	5,000	+	
Germany	Frankfurt	5,000	+	
United States	Los Angeles	5,000		
Spain	Las Palmas de Gran Canaria	4,000	6,000	
United States	San Francisco	4,000	6,000	
Canada	Toronto	4,000	5,500	
Greece	Athens	4,000		
Spain	Pontevedra	4,000		
United Kingdom	London	3,000	5,000	
Slovenia	Ljubljana	3,000	4,000	
New Zealand	Auckland	3,000		
Canada	Montreal	3,000		
Germany	Düsseldorf	2,400		
Germany	Hamburg	2,000	5,000	
United States	Denver	2,000	3,000	
Canada	Vancouver	2,000	3,000	
Netherlands	Amsterdam	2,000		
Brazil	Porto Alegre	2,000		
Greece	Thessaloniki	2,000		
Austria	Vienna	1,500	2,500	
Germany	Cologne	1,500		
Israel	Tel Aviv	1,500		
Denmark	Copenhagen	1,000	3,000	
Hungary	Budapest	1,000	2,000	
France	Paris	1,000	2,000	
United States	Washington, D.C.	1,000	2,000	
United States	Las Vegas	1,000	+	
United States	Miami	1,000	+	
Croatia	Split	1,000	+	
Canada	Victoria	1,000	+	
Ireland	Dublin	1,000		
Germany	Munich	1,000		
United States	New Haven, CT	1,000		
South Korea	Seoul	1,000		
Argentina	Buenos Aires	800		
Netherlands	The Hague	700		
Germany	Hannover	600	+	
Canada	Ottawa	600		
France	Toulouse	500	1,000	
Chile	Concepción	500		
France	Grenoble	500		
Canada	Halifax	500		
Peru	Lima	500		
United States	Lincoln	500		
Canada	Nanaimo	500		
France	Strasbourg	500		
Finland	Turku	500		
Switzerland	Zurich	500		
Slovenia	Maribor	400		
Finland	Tampere	400		
Canada	Winnipeg	400		
Slovenia	Koper	300	+	
Canada	Calgary	300		
Germany	Freiburg	300		
Switzerland	Geneva	300		
Canada	Quebec City	300		
Croatia	Rijeka	300		
Mexico	Mexico City	250		
Germany	Karlsruhe	220	+	
Sweden	Stockholm	200	500	
Estonia	Tallinn	200	400	
United States	Riverside	200	300	
Japan	Tokyo	200	300	
Hong Kong	Hong Kong	200		
Finland	Jyväskylä	200		
Malaysia	Kuala Lumpur	200		
France	Marseille	200		
France	Montpellier	200		
Czech Republic	Prague	200		
Puerto Rico	San Juan	200		
Brazil	São Paulo	200		
Australia	Sydney	200		
Australia	Melbourne	3000		
Sweden	Umeå	200		
Chile	Valparaíso	200		
Finland	Helsinki	150	1,000	
Brazil	Goiânia	150		
Croatia	Pula	150		
Brazil	Rio de Janeiro	150		
Finland	Joensuu	130		
Serbia	Belgrade	100	200	
Poland	Warsaw	100	200	
Bosnia	Sarajevo	100	150	
Canada	Chicoutimi	100	+	
Brazil	Curitiba	100		
France	Dijon	100		
Philippines	Manila	100		
France	Nantes	100		
Ecuador	Quito	100		
Taiwan	Taipei	100		
Uruguay	Montevideo	80		
Colombia	Bogotá	70		
United Kingdom	Brighton	60	+	
France	Aix-en-Provence	60		
United Kingdom	Belfast	60		
Nicaragua	Managua	60		
Montenegro	Podgorica	50	100	
France	Auch	50		
Brazil	Campinas	50		
South Africa	Johannesburg	50		
Cyprus	Nicosia/Buffer Zone	40	85	
Croatia	Buje	40		
France	Pau	40		
France	La Réunion	30		
Hungary	Pécs	25	50	
Egypt	Cairo	20		
France	Rochefort	20		
Germany	Rostock	10	30	

== See also ==
Note. Cities with 'Occupy' articles are in the show-hide table below.

- Occupy movement
- Timeline of Occupy Wall Street
- We are the 99%

Other U.S. protests

- 2011 United States public employee protests
- 2011 Wisconsin protests

Other international protests

- 2009 Iranian presidential election protests
- Anti-austerity movement in Greece
- Anti-austerity movement in Portugal
- Anti-austerity movement in the United Kingdom and 2010 United Kingdom student protests
- 2011–2012 Chilean student protests
- 2011 Israeli social justice protests
- Iceland Kitchenware Revolution
- Spanish 15M Indignants movement
- Time for Outrage!

Related articles

- Bank Transfer Day
- Corruption Perceptions Index
- Economic inequality
- Grassroots movement
- Impact of the Arab Spring
- Income inequality in the United States
- List of countries by distribution of wealth
- List of countries by income equality
- Plutocracy
- Wealth inequality in the United States
