= Manual communication =

Communication using hand gestures

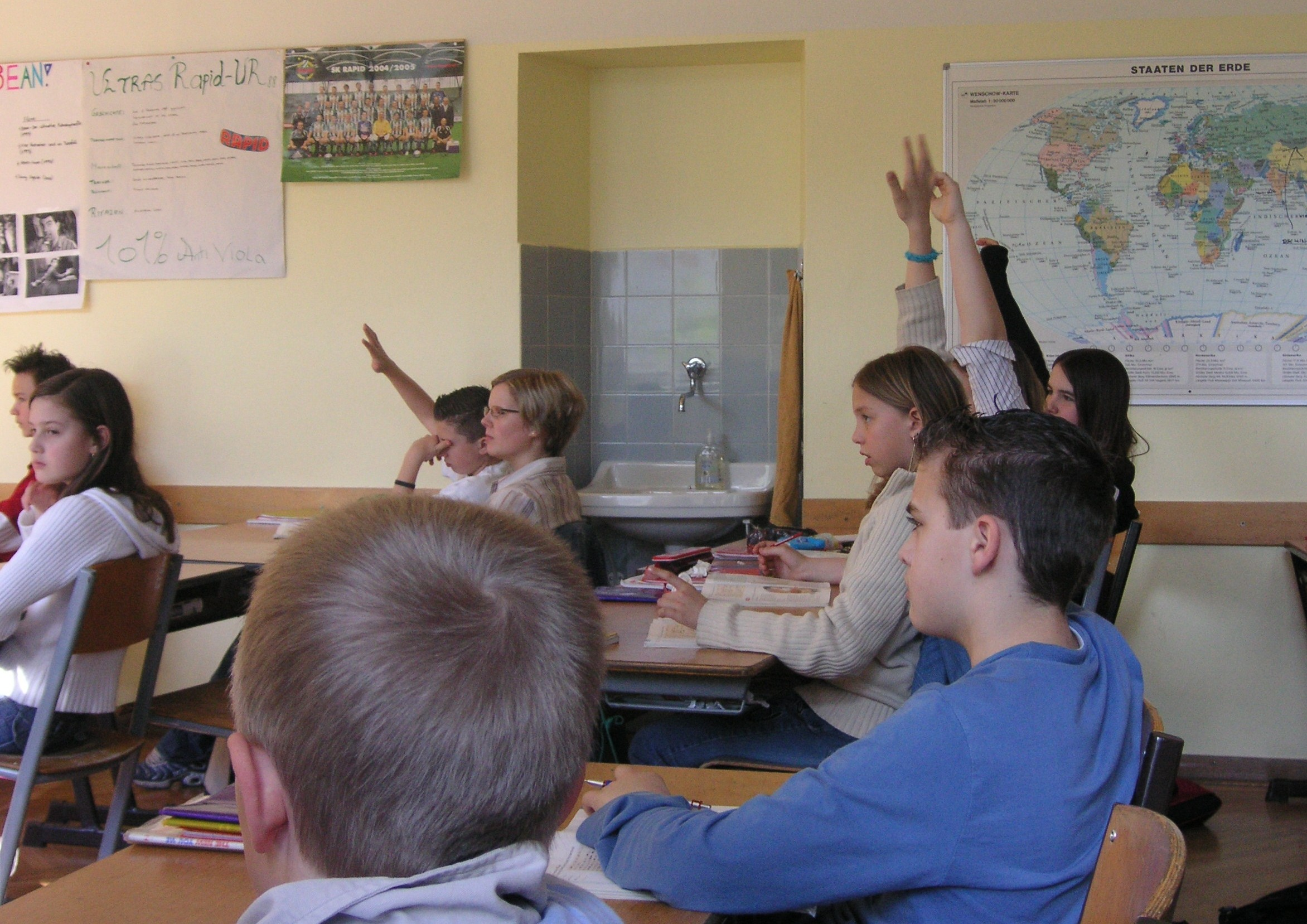
Pupils in a traditional classroom situation signal to their teacher that they want to be heard

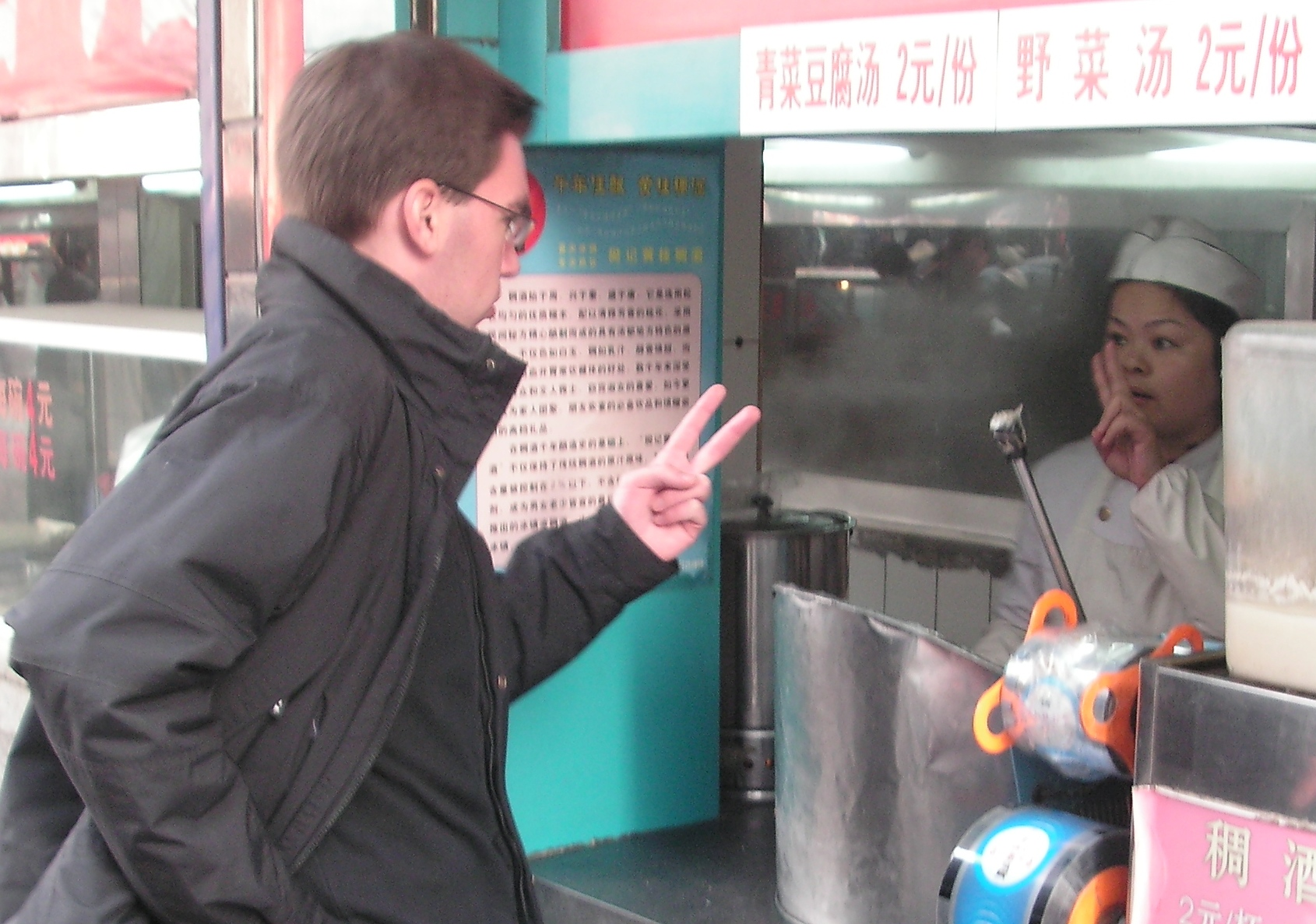
Successful communication between people of different cultures

Manual communication systems use articulation of the hands (hand signs, gestures, etc.) to mediate a message between people. Being expressed manually, they are received visually and sometimes tactually. When it is the primary form of communication, it may be enhanced by body language and facial expressions.

Manual communication is employed in sign languages and manually coded languages, though sign languages also possess non-manual elements. Other systems of manual communication have been developed for specific purposes, typically in situations where speech is not practical (such as loud environments) or permitted, or where secrecy is desired.

== Examples ==
- Charades
- Diving signals — hand communication methods while scuba diving
- Flag semaphores — telegraphy systems using hand-held flags, other objects, or the hands themselves
- Finger counting
  - Chinese number gestures
  - Open outcry hand signaling
- Fingerspelling or manual alphabets
- Gang signals — signs used to signify allegiance to a gang or local gang branches
- Hand signals in traffic
- Monastic sign languages — symbolic gestural communication used by monastic communities
- Rueda de Casino — a dance that uses hand motions to "call" other dancers
- Tic-tac — a traditional method of hand signs used by bookmakers in horse racing
- U.S. Army hand and arm signals
