= Hand signals (disambiguation) =

Hand signals or hand signaling may refer to:

- Hand signals used by cyclists and motorists to indicate intended actions
- Hand signals (pickleball) used by line judges and players
- Hand signaling (open outcry) used on financial trading floors
- U.S. Army hand and arm signals used during radio silence
