= Wietse van der Werf =

Social entrepreneur, conservationist

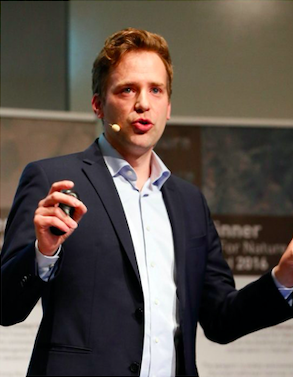
- Van der Werf in 2016
- Born: 22 March 1983 (age 43); Utrecht, Netherlands
- Occupations: Conservationist, entrepreneur, author
- Years active: 1992–present
- Known for: Sea Ranger Service

Wietse van der Werf (born March 22, 1983) is a Dutch social entrepreneur, conservationist and author, most recognised for his work combining ocean conservation and social entrepreneurship. He is the founder of the Sea Ranger Service and was named European Young Leader in 2020.

== Early life ==
Van der Werf grew up in Utrecht, The Netherlands, and was a nature enthusiast from a young age. Being installed by the local mayor of Nieuwegein as a youth ranger in 1992, he started his conservation career at the age of 9. Initial work activities included bird counting and forestry work.

== Environmental activism ==
From the age of 15, Van der Werf became involved in environmental activism and later moved to the UK where he worked with groups such as the Climate Camp and The Mischief Makers, the art-activist collective which he co-founded in 2004. He served with the Sea Shepherd Conservation Society on multiple Antarctica expeditions before founding the marine conservation NGO The Black Fish, as part of which he led numerous investigations into illegal fishing around the Mediterranean Sea. Van der Werf has since distanced himself from direct activism, instead pursuing a social entrepreneurial approach to ocean conservation.

== Sea Ranger Service ==
Van der Werf founded the Sea Ranger Service in 2016 as a social enterprise which trains young people as Sea Rangers and deploys special sailing work ships to carry out marine management tasks in direct cooperation with governments. Sea Ranger tasks include maritime surveillance, wildlife monitoring, underwater photography and surveys, sea water sampling, restoration of underwater seagrass meadows and general offshore inspections tasks but excludes any enforcement activities. The current operational area for the Sea Rangers is the North Sea yet the Sea Ranger Service has announced plans to scale its approach internationally, through a social franchising model which it has developed in collaboration with PwC and IKEA. In May 2019 the Sea Ranger Service was awarded the Medal of Honour by the Enkhuizen Maritime College and the Dutch Commercial Sailing Board for operating the first commercial sailing vessel in the offshore industry .

== Conservation philosophy ==
Van der Werf has stated the inspiration for the Sea Ranger Service has originated from the Civilian Conservation Corps, a programme launched by US president Franklin D. Roosevelt in 1933 to alleviate poverty and unemployment during the Great Depression whilst simultaneously carrying out large scale landscape restoration and conservation work. The Sea Ranger Service follows a similar approach for ocean conservation. It trains young people (partly long-term unemployed youth) with the help of veterans as Sea Rangers. After their one-year deployment as Sea Rangers, in which they carry out conservation tasks at sea, the Sea Rangers transition into maritime employment. Van der Werf advocates extensively on the benefits of social approaches to conservation and has gathered growing political support for his work. In December 2018 four Dutch government ministers signed the Green Deal Sea Ranger Service to improve environmental conservation of the North Sea through social pilots run by the Sea Ranger Service.

== Personal life ==
Van der Werf lives in London, The Netherlands. He is vegan.

== Books ==
- The Next Eco-Warriors (2011), co-author, Conari Press
- Bluefin Bonanza (2012), Big Green Factory
- No More Endlings (2015), Motivational Press
- We Are Here (2020), in production

== Awards ==
- Future for Nature Award (2016)
- Ashoka Fellowship (2018)
- Summit Fellowship (2019)
- European Young Leader (2020)

== See also ==
- Sea Ranger Service
- https://www.wietse.org
