= Occupy movement hand signals =

Group of hand signals used by Occupy protesters

The Occupy movement hand signals are a group of hand signals used by Occupy movement protesters to negotiate a consensus. Hand signals are used instead of conventional audible signals, like applause, shouts, or booing, because they do not interrupt the speaker using the human microphone, a system where the front of the crowd repeats the speaker so that the content can be heard at the back of the crowd. The signals have been compared to other hand languages used by soldiers, cliques and Wall Street traders.

Between sharing of information on Facebook, Twitter, and other news reports, the hand signals have become common at other Occupy movement protest locations. Some protesters go to neighboring groups to assist in teaching the hand signals along with other general cooperation. There are YouTube videos showing the hand signals, though the signals are not universal at all locations.

== Example signals ==
=== Feeling ===
Meaning	Gesture	Description	Notes
Agreement		"Up twinkles"; both hands raised with fingers pointing up and being wiggled.	This handsignal was borrowed from the Green Party, who borrowed it from the ASL word for applause. It may be referred to as simply "twinkles".
Agreement		Thumbs up	Some locations use thumb gestures to show approval, neutrality, or disapproval.
Disagreement		"Down twinkles"; arms raised but showing the back of both hands with fingers pointing down and wiggling	One will be asked by the facilitator to clarify one's objection. In Occupy Boston (possibly other sites), down twinkles go by the alternate name of "squid fingers".
Disagreement		Thumbs down	One will be asked by the facilitator to clarify one's objection. In Occupy Boston (possibly other sites), down twinkles go by the alternate name of "squid fingers".
Neutral / unsure		Flat hands	One may be asked to clarify one's position.
Neutral / unsure		Thumb to side	One may be asked to clarify one's position.
Oppose		Fist raised	Opposition to the proposal
Hard block		Arms up and crossed	Firm opposition to the proposal, a break from the consensus that cannot be supported by this individual.

Twinkles and down twinkles are referred to as a "temperature check". They indicate if a group is getting close to consensus. Twinkles are also known as "sparkle" or "jazz hands" or spirit fingers.

=== Speaking ===
Meaning	Gesture	Description	Notes
Want to talk		Raised, open hand	A person wishes to speak
Direct response		Both hands moving alternately front to back on each side of the head, directed at an individual	Indicates that critical information was missing from something that was just said.
Clarifying question		Single hand formed in the shape of a C	Means that a person has a question that needs to be answered before they can vote on an issue.
Point of process		Triangle formed by two hands with the tips of index fingers and of thumbs touching	Conversation has strayed from the original topic.
Wrap it up		Both hands moved in a circular motion about each other	Suggests that the speaker should make their points and finish speaking.
Raise the roof		Both hands with palms facing up being moved up and down above shoulder level	Suggests that the speaker should speak up.

== Origins ==
In addition to commonalities with various sign languages, and cultural gestures, these or similar hand signals have been used by other groups and events prior to the Occupy Wall Street protests. These include:

- Camp for Climate Action
- The Woodcraft Folk
- Direct Action Network
- The 15-M Movement beginning in Spain 2011
- UK Uncut
- Civil rights movement
- Global Justice Movement

== Influence ==
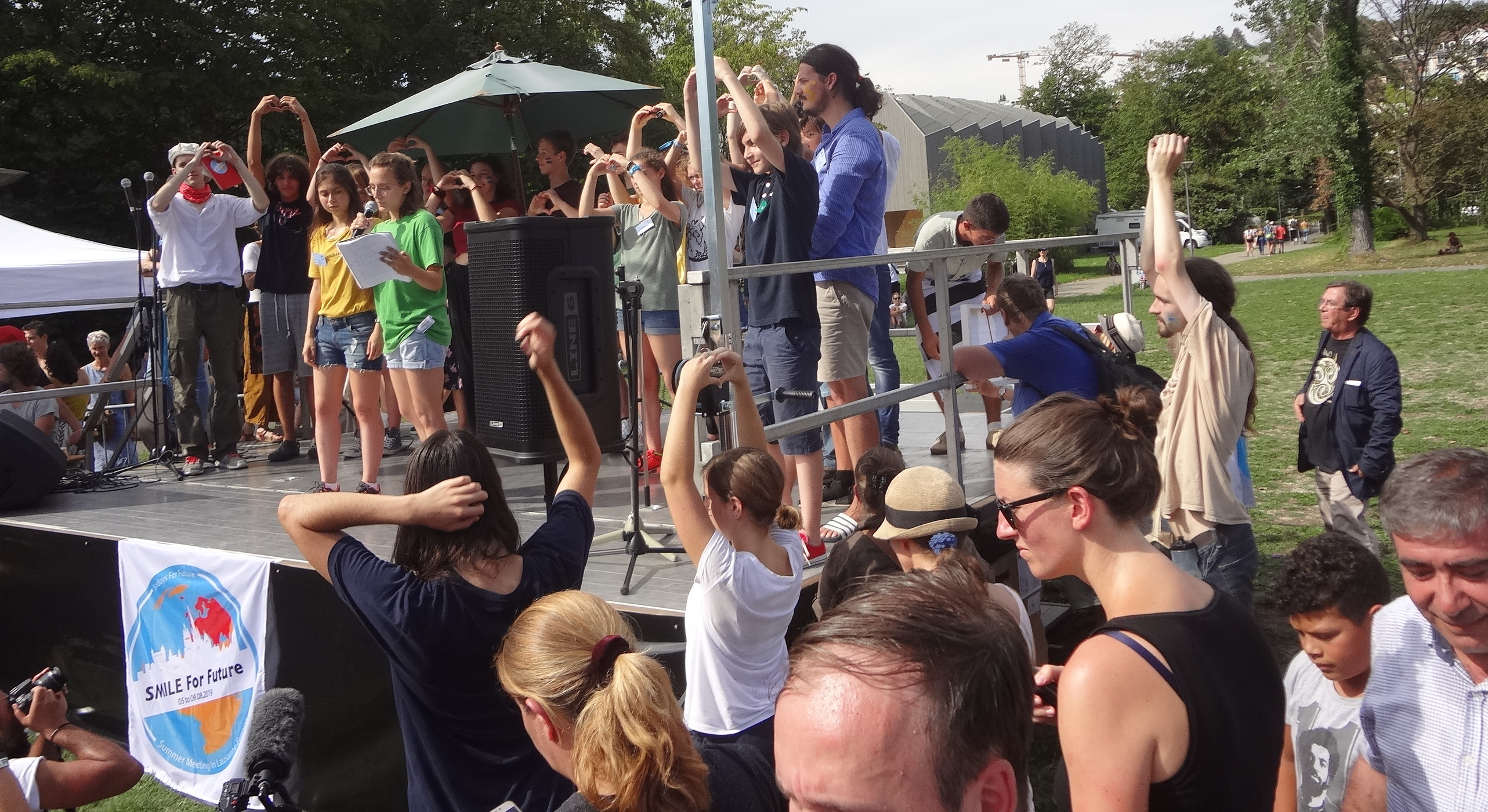
Heart signs at a school strike for the climate (Lausanne, Switzerland, 2019).

Some followers of agile software development processes have drawn on the Occupy movement's hand signs in an attempt to improve communication during meetings, notably the UK's Government Digital Service.

After the Occupy movements, these hand signals were used by other social movements such as the School strike for the climate, Ende Gelände and Extinction Rebellion.

== See also ==
- Consensus decision-making – hand signals
- Hand signaling (open outcry)
- Human microphone
- Jazz hands
- Thames Valley Climate Action
