= Human microphone =

Method for delivering a speech without electronic amplification

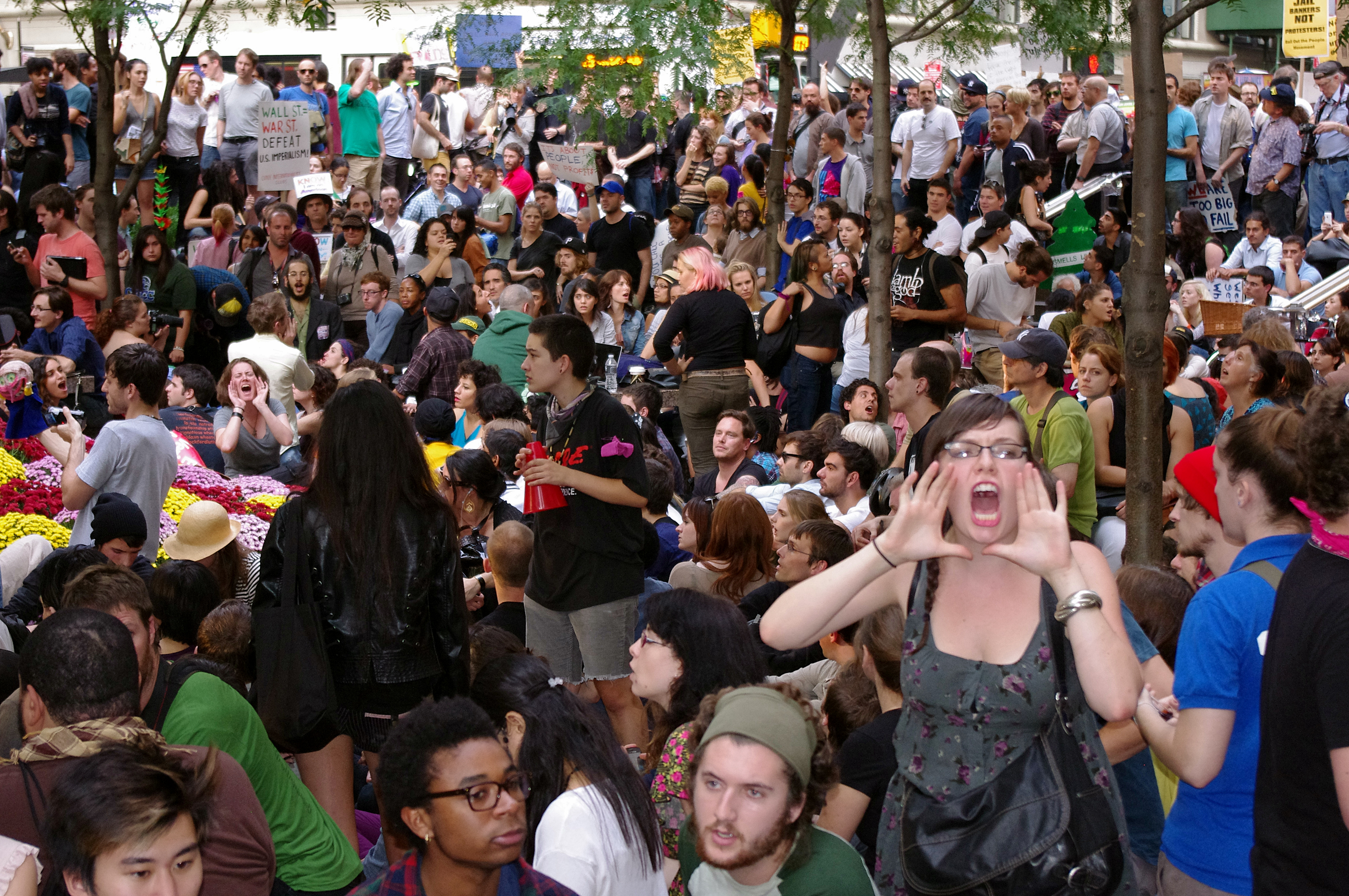
A crowd of protesters engaging in the "human microphone" on 30 September 2011, at Occupy Wall Street

A human microphone, also known as the people's microphone, is a means for delivering a speech to a large group of people, wherein persons gathered around the speaker repeat the speaker's words, thus "amplifying" the voice of the speaker without the need for amplification equipment.

The speaker begins by saying "mic check". When the people near the speaker respond "mic check", the speaker knows they have the group's attention. The speaker says a short phrase, part of a speech, and then pauses. Those who can hear what the speaker has said repeat the phrase in unison, and when finished, the speaker says another phrase, then pauses again waiting for a response, etc., until the speaker's speech is complete.

If the entire gathering still cannot hear the speaker, organizers ask for additional repetitions by those at the limit of earshot. For large gatherings, this may require two or three waves of repetition.

== History ==
Protesters repeat what is said to replicate the function of prohibited public address systems.

The use of electronic amplification devices, such as loudspeakers or bullhorns, may require permits for "amplified sound". The use of human microphones provides a way for people to address large gatherings without running afoul of such requirements. The human microphone was first used in the anti-nuclear protests in the United States and later in the 1999 Seattle WTO protests.

This method of communication attracted attention due to its use by Occupy Wall Street. It was deployed at large general assemblies to help ensure everyone could hear announcements, because New York had regulations prohibiting the use of conventional megaphones.

== As a form of protest ==
The technique has also been used by protestors to interrupt and talk over a speaker. Politicians such as Scott Walker, Michele Bachmann, Joseph Lieberman, Christine Lagarde and Barack Obama have been targets for this style of heckling. Using the human microphone to interrupt an electrically amplified speech has become known as "mic checking" the speaker, as in "Karl Rove ... got mic-checked during his speaking event".

Critics of the way Occupy protestors use mic-checking, including Karl Rove, have suggested it does not respect the principle of free speech and others have criticised it for producing the illusion of group consensus amongst those acting as the "amplifiers".

Sympathisers have argued the practice highlights the existence of considerable inequality in power of expression that exists between the one percent and much of the rest of the population.

== See also ==
- Call and response
- Occupy hand signals
