= Mischief Makers (disambiguation) =

Mischief Makers is a 1997 platform video game. It may also refer to:

- Les Mistons (The Mischief Makers), 1957 French short film by Francois Truffaut
- The Mischief Maker, a 1916 American silent comedy-drama film
- The Mischief Makers, British artist collective
- Mischief Makers (podcast). 2020s podcast by British theater company Mischief Theatre
- Mischief Makers (TV series), 1960 children's television series from the Our Gang silents shorts
- Shovavim, Hebrew for "mischief makers"

== Other ==
- The original title for the 1906 musical revue Mam'zelle Champagne
