= WingLights =

Bicycle turn signals

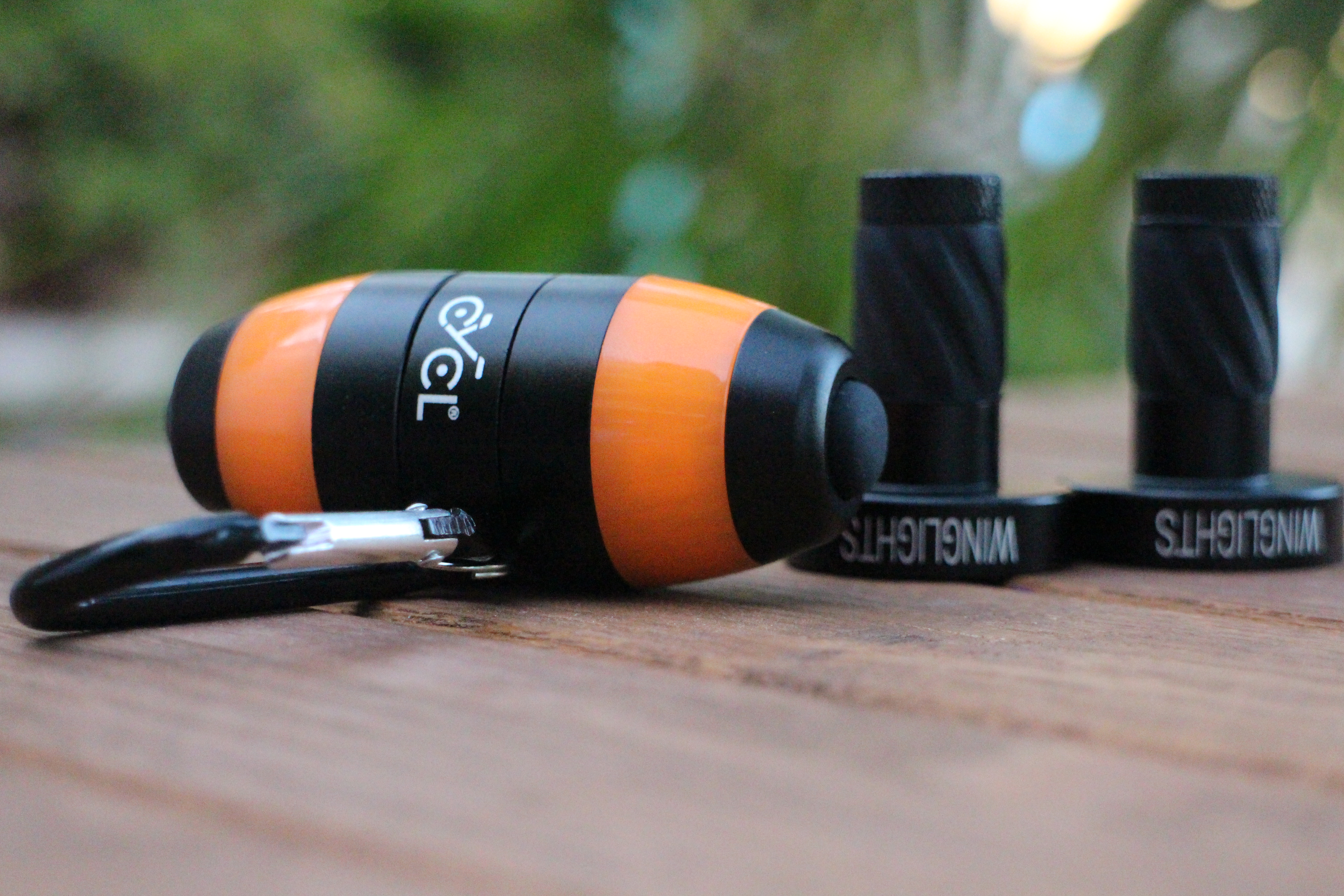
WingLights Mag

WingLights are LED-based turn signals that attach to the ends of bicycle handlebars. They are designed to augment traditional hand signals, thereby improving cyclist visibility and safety.

== History ==
In December 2014, London-based startup Cycl launched the product on Kickstarter. The campaign was successfully funded, raising £17,000 from over six hundred backers.

In January 2017, the product was pitched on Dragons' Den, securing an investment from Nick Jenkins.
