= Thames Valley Climate Action =

UK-based environmental organisation

The Thames Valley Climate Action is an Oxford-based environmental group.

== Protest actions ==
- On 11 August 2008 several protesters from Oxford and Thames Valley Climate Action glued their hands to the doors of BHP Billiton's headquarters in Victoria, London protest against the use of coal as a fuel. The protest was part of the Climate camp held at Kingsnorth power station in England.
- On 5 June 2009, 13 protesters from the Thames Valley Climate Action entered the headquarters of the engineering firm BAM Nuttall in Camberly, England to protest against the firm's plans to build a coal-fired power plant in Hoo, Kent.

== Meeting process ==
Meetings are run on a consensually. Hand signals are used to help the meeting run smoothly. These signals include the use of a finger wiggling signal called Twinkles to indicate agreement.

== See also ==
- Occupy hand signals
