= Sea Ranger Service =

Social enterprise

- Founded: 2016
- Founder: Wietse van der Werf
- Type: Social enterprise
- Purpose: Ocean Conservation
- Location: The Netherlands
- Method: Offshore management services, maritime employability programmes, sustainable ship building
- Website: http://www.searangers.org

The Sea Ranger Service is a social enterprise based in The Netherlands, which works in direct cooperation with government agencies to manage ocean areas. The organisation trains young people as Sea Rangers and deploys special sailing work ships to carry out marine management tasks, as well as research and eco-system regeneration work. The current operational area for the Sea Rangers is the North Sea.

== History ==
The Sea Ranger Service was founded by conservationist Wietse van der Werf in 2016. After having been awarded the Future for Nature Award for his innovative approach to marine conservation, he used the prize money to start the Sea Ranger initiative, which was officially launched by Mayor of Rotterdam, Ahmed Aboutaleb, in August 2016. Initially founded as a non-profit organisation in The Netherlands, the Sea Ranger Service developed a business model for its conservation work and transitioned into operating as a social enterprise from 2017. In March 2018 the organisation organised a Sea Ranger Bootcamp, in which the first Sea Rangers were selected and trained. Since October 2018 the Sea Ranger Service operates its first sailing work vessel on the North Sea, with Den Helder as its home port. A second vessel has been under construction in Hardinxveld-Giessendam since 2016.

== Approach ==
Van der Werf has stated the original inspiration for the Sea Ranger Service has come from the Civilian Conservation Corps, a programme launched by US president Franklin D. Roosevelt to alleviate poverty and unemployment in the inner cities during the Great Depression in 1933, whilst simultaneously carrying out large-scale landscape restoration and conservation work. The Sea Ranger Service follows a similar approach for ocean conservation. It trains young people (partly long-term unemployed youth) with the help of veterans as Sea Rangers. After their one-year deployment as Sea Rangers, in which they carry out conservation tasks at sea, the Sea Rangers transition into maritime employment. The Sea Ranger Service exclusively operates commercially certified sailing work vessels. In May 2019 the Sea Ranger Service was awarded the Medal of Honour by the Enkhuizen Maritime College and the Dutch Commercial Sailing Board, for operating the first commercial sailing vessel in the offshore industry. The Sea Ranger Service has announced plans to scale its approach internationally, through a social franchising model.

== Mandate ==
The Green Deal Sea Ranger Service was signed in December 2018 between the Dutch Ministry of Agriculture, Fisheries and Food Quality (LNV), Ministry of Infrastructure and Water Management (IenW), Ministry of Economic Affairs and Climate Policy (EZK), Ministry of Social Affairs and Employability (SZW) and the Sea Ranger Service. It sets out an initial two-year period in which the Dutch government works together with the Sea Ranger Service to explore which tasks it can be appointed. The initial pilots as part of the Green Deal were started in the North Sea in the spring of 2019. According to Sea Ranger Service its tasks include maritime surveillance, wildlife monitoring, underwater photography and surveys, sea water sampling, restoration of underwater seagrass meadows and general offshore inspections tasks but excludes any enforcement tasks.
