= General assembly (Occupy movement) =

Direct democratic meetings organized by the Occupy movement

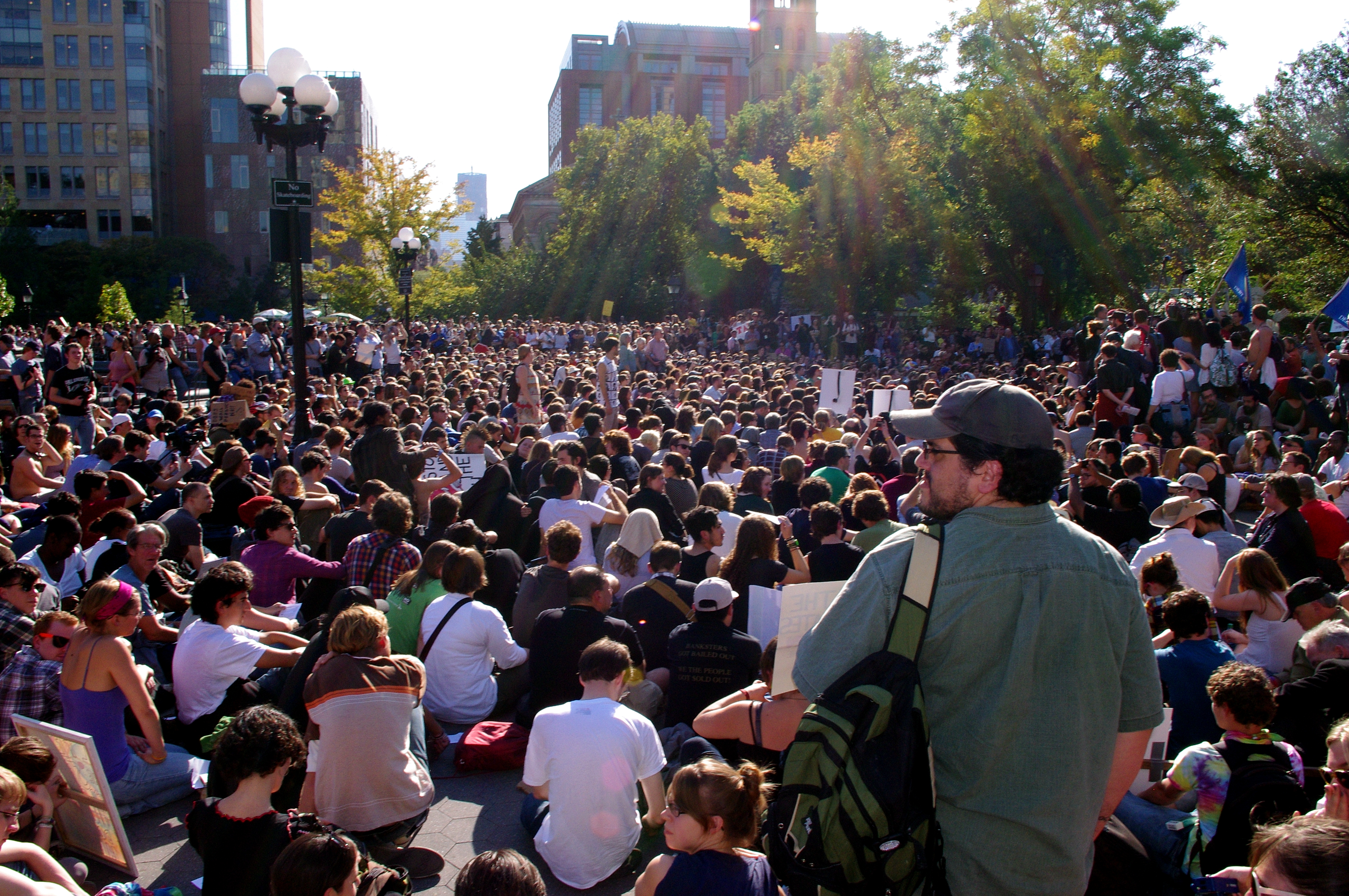
The New York General Assembly meeting in Washington Square Park on October 8, 2011

General assemblies (GA) were the primary decision making bodies of the global Occupy movement which arose in 2011. Open to all who wished to take part, general assemblies allowed for an inclusive form of direct democracy. Such assemblies aimed to establish a consensus among all participants.

Assemblies were primarily voice-based, with different speakers addressing the crowd in turn. The specific forms adopted by the Occupy assemblies varied across the world. Most assemblies had facilitators to keep order and ensure that, if possible, everyone had their say. The larger assemblies often restricted the speakers only to spokespeople who represented smaller working groups, however each individual was still able to provide feedback, if only by means of hand signals.

General assemblies had been used by the Occupy Wall Street movement since its planning stages in August 2011, and were held in Zuccotti Park during the occupation itself. The name "New York City General Assembly" was given to the general assemblies taking place in Zuccotti Park. The "NYCGA" website, as it was known, was maintained by the Internet Working group as a resource for all assemblies and its working group meetings.

== Methods ==
Hand signals used at Occupy general assemblies which allowed continuous feedback and audience participation without the need to interrupt speakers

General assemblies were the de facto decision making body of the Occupy movement from its inception. Designed to facilitate the formation of consensus, they typically reflected egalitarian principles. They were often organized to ensure everyone had the chance to have their say, to counteract the natural tendency for the most forceful to dominate disorganized discussion. In larger assemblies such as some of the ones in New York, this was done by formal mechanisms such as the progressive stack.

Another organizational feature from many larger general assemblies was to limit speaking mainly just to representatives of smaller working groups. This meant that each individual had a chance to speak and ask questions at work group level, while at assembly level the discussions were kept at a manageable length. In the smaller assemblies, anyone was able to make proposals for discussion. In larger assemblies, the audience got to make brief spoken responses to proposals from working groups. A queuing based system called a stack was sometimes used to manage this, with the facilitators indicating when it was a particular occupier's turn to speak. Even at the largest assemblies, individuals could always feed back to speakers and the crowd by means of hand signals.

Occasionally the hierarchical relationship between general assembly and the working group was reversed – a working group would make decisions for the assembly rather than merely feeding into it. For example, with confidential decisions that the assembly wished to hide from possible government agents or other informants, the assembly sometimes delegated executive function to a direct action committee, which was "empowered" by the assembly to plan actions such as publicity grabbing stunts that were best kept secret from the authorities until they have been executed.

== History ==
The use of General assemblies for consensus based decision making can be traced to the Athenian democracy that arose around the sixth century BC in Ancient Greece. Athens' version of direct democracy was ended in 322 BC after defeat by the Macedonians. Since then formal decision making assemblies of Common people have occurred only sporadically and have been of little prominence in world affairs, with exceptions occurring as part of the direct democracy taking place in the Swiss Cantons of the late Middle Ages, and the Quaker movement which arose in the mid 17th century. In the 20th century, consensus based assemblies enjoyed a modest resurgence with the US civil rights movement of the 1960s. They grew in prevalence at around the turn of the millennium, manifesting as the spokescouncils of the 1999 anti-globalization movement and as the horizontalist assemblies that began to appear in South America as a response to the Argentine economic crisis (1999–2002).

Assemblies were used from the start of the Spanish Indignados movement in May 2011 – this is sometimes seen as the start of the wider Occupy movement, though more often it is considered an immediate precursor, with the global Occupy movement itself starting with Occupy Wall Street.

Assemblies were used during the planning stage of Occupy Wall Street, with the first one taking place by the Wall Street Bull on 2 August 2011. The first general assembly of Occupy Wall Street itself took place in New York on the day of the movement's launch, September 17, 2011. Protesters had originally planned to hold the meeting at the Chase Manhattan Plaza, but were prevented by police action. According to journalist Nathan Schneider, protesters used Wikipedia to help identify Zuccotti Park as the location for their first assembly. There have since been thousands of general assemblies taking place across the world.

== Assessment ==
General assemblies are typically experienced positively by those who choose to participate, so much so that occupiers have often been described as "fetishizing" them. Newcomers have sometimes indulged in soapboxing on their first speech, but folk typically soon chose to respect the process. The Marxist activist Larry Holmes said that the Occupy movement needed to have general assemblies so they could create "real democracy", to oppose the existing state sanctioned institutions which he believes are controlled by financial interests. Anthropologist David Graeber has suggested the use of assemblies was a key reason why the Occupy movement gained momentum, in contrast to many other attempts to start a post crisis movement, which used more standard methods of organization but which all failed to get off the ground. The author and academic Luke Bretherton has written that general assemblies provide an "experience of a completely different space and time" so people can perceive the oppressive nature of regular reality.

There has been some criticism of the model, especially concerning the time it takes to form consensus about specific demands. Nathan Schneider has suggested that an issue with assemblies is that to some extent they are incompatible with traditional political groups such as parties, unions and civil society NGOs – which is problematic as they need to liaise with these groups to get their message actualized. The specific forms used at the London GA have been criticized for the fact that they allow even a single participant to block consensus, in contrast to GAs in the United States where some require a minimum of 10% of participants to block a motion in order to prevent it being passed. Malcolm Gladwell suggested that relying solely on consensus-based assemblies to make decisions, while remaining leaderless, was hampering the ability of Occupy to create meaningful change. He contrasted Occupy with the civil rights movement, which he says was carefully controlled and "incredibly hierarchical", under the leadership of Martin Luther King Jr. – whom Gladwell describes as "one of the foremost tacticians of the 20th century."

By January 2012 general assemblies were still popular around the world even though many of the Occupy camps had been dispersed either voluntarily or by police action. However some journalists had begun to report incidents of infighting among different groups and a general tendency for discussions to become more insular and trivial.

A trend developed in the global movement for some occupiers to take significant actions autonomously without waiting for approval from an assembly. Professor Grace Davie reports that at an Occupy Wall Street meeting to discuss general assemblies, held in late December 2011, several participants expressed dissatisfaction with them. Yet other occupiers were advocating for even greater use. One of the more enthusiastic occupiers predicts a "coming age of General Assemblies" which he thinks may be "Humankind's best hope". On 4 January 2012, The Future of Occupy Collective, an organization set up by occupiers, published their first newsletter on the future of assemblies, where they said: "Continuing to hold General Assemblies, in one way or another, seems more important than ever".

== See also ==
- Deliberative democracy
- Participatory democracy
