= Bicycology =

UK-based non-profit organization

Bicycology is a UK-based collective that was formed after the 2005 London to Scotland G8 Bike Ride. It is a non-hierarchical non-profit organisation which aims to promote cycling as part of a wider focus on social and environmental sustainability. Bicycology has received funding from Artists Project Earth and is a member organisation of the World Carfree Network.

== Philosophy ==
Bicycology involves itself in what is referred to as "bicycle politics" and Aurora Trujillo (a member of Bicycology) co-organised a two-day Bicycle Politics Symposium and Workshop in September 2010 at the Centre for Mobilities Research, Lancaster University. Aurora presented a paper titled "Cycling as an oppressed practice: towards a transformative 'promotion' of Cycling" whilst Matt Wilson (another member of Bicycology) presented a paper on "Cycling and the Law" which addressed the issue from an anarchist perspective.

== 2006 Tour ==
The first major event organised by Bicycology was a tour from London to Lancaster in the summer of 2006. On arrival in Lancaster the group put on various events including a film night and a free bike repair session. The group was then joined by a number of Lancastrians for a ride to the first Camp for Climate Action in Megawatt Valley near Leeds.

== 2007 Tour ==
In the summer of 2007 Bicycology organised another tour, this time from Aylesbury to Exeter (two of the original Cycling towns chosen by Cycling England). About twenty people completed the tour, travelling solely by bike and carrying or towing all their equipment, which included a renewable energy trailer.

== Routes to Solutions ==
Rather than another long distance tour, in the summer of 2008 Bicycology organised a week-long festival of cycling and sustainability in Lancaster and Morecambe which they called "Routes to Solutions". Events included workshops, film nights, rides and a Lancaster Critical Mass on the last Friday of August.

== 2012 Tour ==
In May 2012 Bicycology toured the Midlands with events around the slogan "Parking the Car ... For Good!" On 12 May they bought up spaces at the car park in Coventry city centre and used them to set up a display promoting their message.

== See also ==
- Cycling advocacy
- Effects of the automobile on societies
