= Chinese number gestures =

Hand gestures for numbers 1–10 used by Chinese speakers

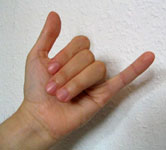
A common sign for the number six

Chinese number gestures are a method to signify the natural numbers one through ten using one hand. This method may have been developed to bridge the many varieties of Chinese—for example, the numbers 4 (Chinese: 四; pinyin: sì) and 10 (Chinese: 十; pinyin: shí) are hard to distinguish in some dialects. Some suggest that it was also used by business people during bargaining (i.e., to convey a bid by feeling the hand gesture in a sleeve) when they wish for more privacy in a public place. These gestures are fully integrated into Chinese Sign Language.

== Methods ==
While the five digits on one hand can easily express the numbers one through five, six through ten have special signs that can be used in commerce or day-to-day communication. The gestures are rough representations of the Chinese numeral characters they represent. The system varies in practice, especially for the representation of "7" to "10". Two of the systems are listed below:

- Six (六)
  - The little finger and thumb are extended (the extended thumb indicating one set of 5); the other fingers are closed, sometimes with the palm facing the signer.
- Seven (七)
  - Northern China: The fingertips are all touching, pointed upwards, or just the fingertips of the thumb and first two fingers (the most common method); another method is similar to the eight (described below) except that the little finger is also extended.
  - Northern China: The index finger and middle finger point outward, with the thumb extended upwards (the extended thumb indicating one set of 5), sometimes with the palm facing the observer.
  - Coastal southern China: The index finger points down with the thumb extended, mimicking the shape of a "7".
- Eight (八)
  - Northern China: The thumb and index finger make an "L" and the other fingers are closed, with the palm facing the observer.
  - Northern China: The index finger and middle finger point down and with the fingertips optionally touching a horizontal surface, making the Chinese number 8 ("八").
  - Coastal southern China: The thumb, index finger, and middle finger are extended.
- Nine (九)
  - Mainland China: The index finger makes a hook and the other fingers are closed, sometimes with the palm facing the signer.
  - Taiwan: Four of the five digits of the hand are extended, the exception being the little finger.
  - Hong Kong: Both methods are used.
- Ten (十)
  - The fist is closed with the palm facing the signer, or the middle finger crosses an extended index finger, facing the observer. Some Chinese distinguish between zero and ten by having the thumb closed or open, respectively.
  - The arms are raised and the index fingers of both hands are crossed in a "十" (making the Chinese number ten) with the palms facing in opposite directions, optionally with the hands placed in front of the signer's face.

Use of the signs corresponds to the use of numbers in the Chinese language. For instance, the sign for five just as easily means fifty. A two followed by a six, using a single hand only, could mean 260 or 2600 etc. besides twenty-six. These signs also commonly refer to days of the week, starting from Monday, as well as months of the year, whose names in Chinese are enumerations.

In different regions signs for numbers vary significantly. One may interpret the "8" sign as a "7". The "index finger-hook" symbol for 9, also means "death" in other contexts.

The numbers zero through five are simpler:

- Zero (〇)
  - Northern China: The fist is closed. This may be interpreted as 10 depending on the situation, though some Chinese distinguish between zero and ten by having the thumb closed or open, respectively.
  - Coastal southern China: The thumb and index finger make a circle, with the other three fingers closed.
- One (一)
  - The index finger is extended.
- Two (二)
  - The index and middle fingers are extended.
- Three (三)
  - The thumb and index finger are closed and the other three fingers are extended.
  - The thumb holds the little finger down in the palm and the middle three fingers are extended.
- Four (四)
  - The thumb is held in the palm and the four fingers are extended.
- Five (五)
  - All five digits are extended.
  - Only the thumb is extended (either upwards or outwards) with the palm facing the signer.

Counting with fingers is often different from expressing a specific number with a finger gesture. When counting, the palm can be either facing its owner or the audience, depending on the purpose. Before counting, all fingers are closed; counting starts by extending the thumb as the first, then the index finger as the second, until all fingers are extended as the fifth; then counting can be continued by folding fingers with the same sequence, from thumb through the little finger, for counting from the sixth through the tenth. Repeating the same method for counting larger numbers. One can also starts counting with all fingers extended. Some believe that for formal scenario such as giving speech or presentation, counting with the palm facing the audience and starting with all fingers extended is more polite, since the gesture of folding of fingers representing bowing.

When playing drinking finger games (划拳, 猜拳), slightly different sets of finger gestures of numbers is used. One of them is:

- Zero (〇)
  - The fist is closed.
- One (一)
  - The thumb is extended with all other fingers folded toward the palm.
- Two (二)
  - The thumb and index finger make an "L", other fingers closed.
- Three (三)
  - With the last two fingers closed and the rest fingers (the thumb and the first two fingers) extended, or
  - With the index finger and thumb closed, the last three fingers are extended.
- Four (四)
  - The thumb is held in palm with the four fingers extended.
- Five (五)
  - All five digits are extended.

== Gallery ==
=== From 1 to 5 ===
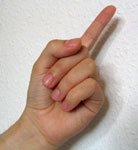
1

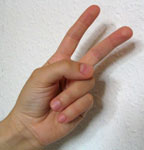
2

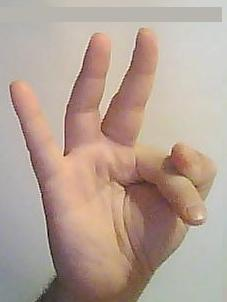
3

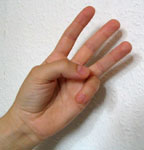
3 (alternative)

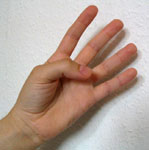
4

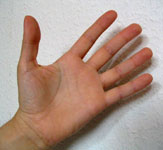
5

=== From 6 to 10 in North China ===
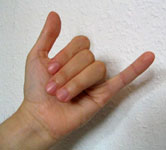
6

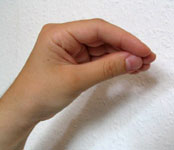
7

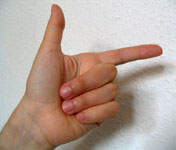
8

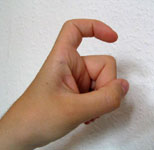
9

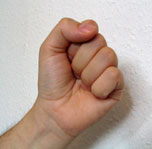
10 (or 0)

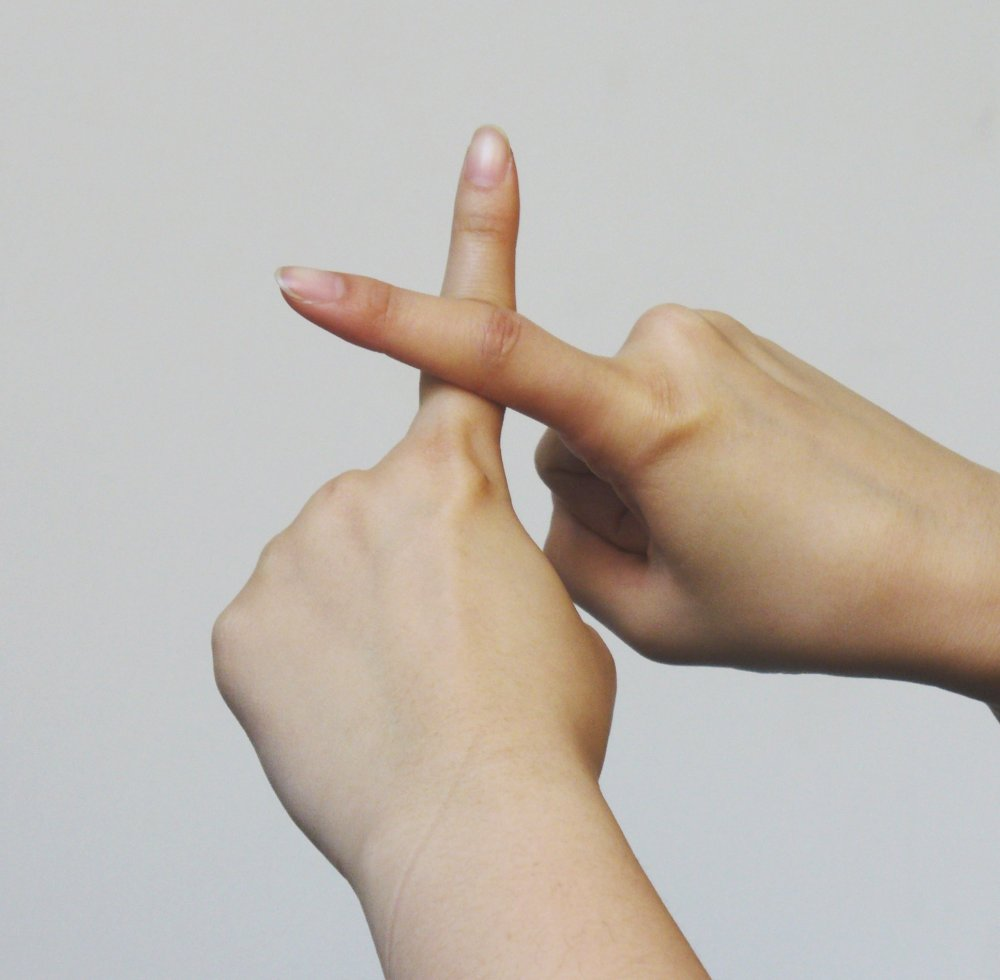
10 (alternative)

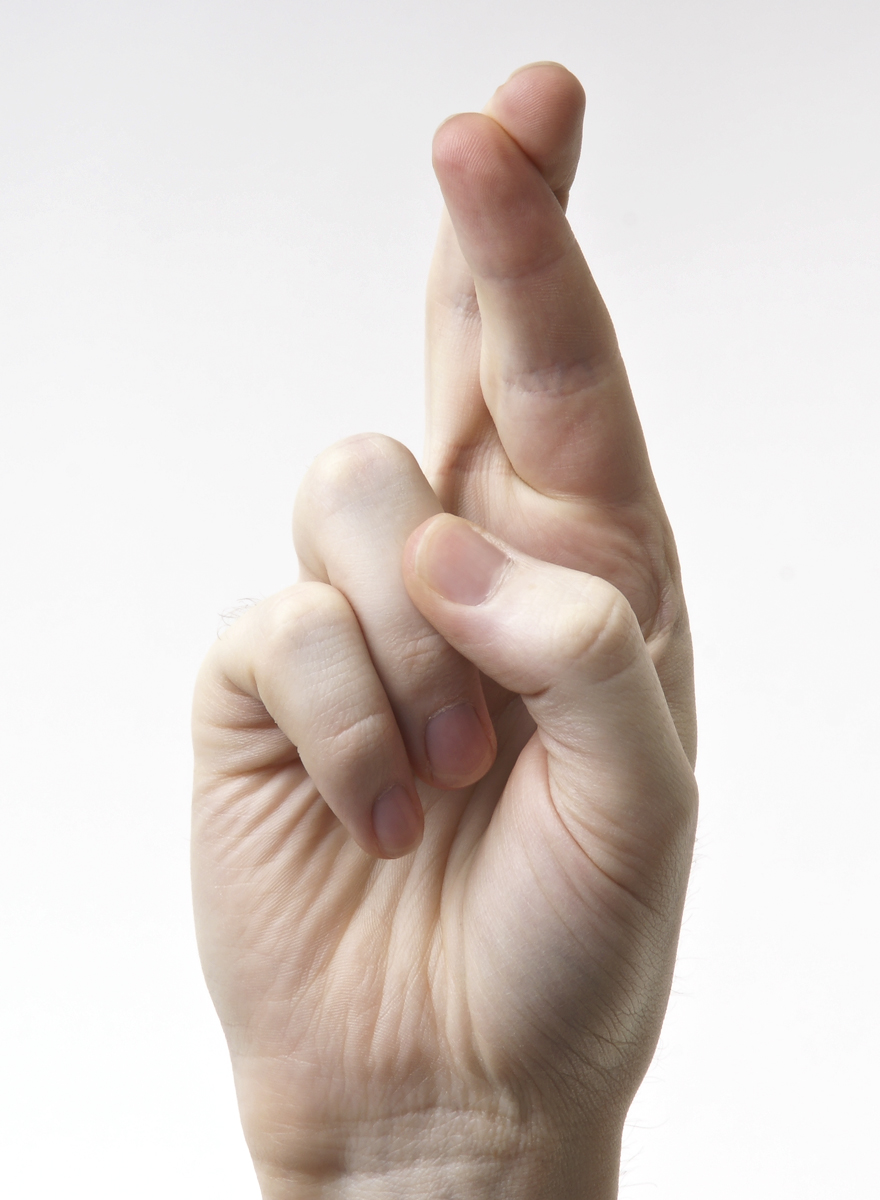
10 (alternative)

=== From 6 to 10 in coastal South China ===
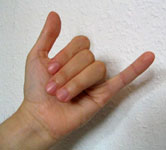
6

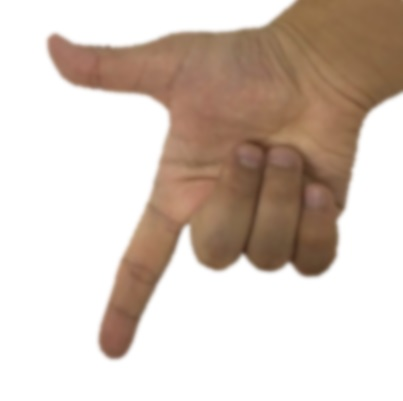
7

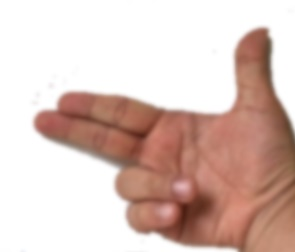
8

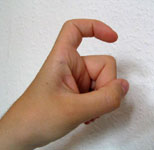
9

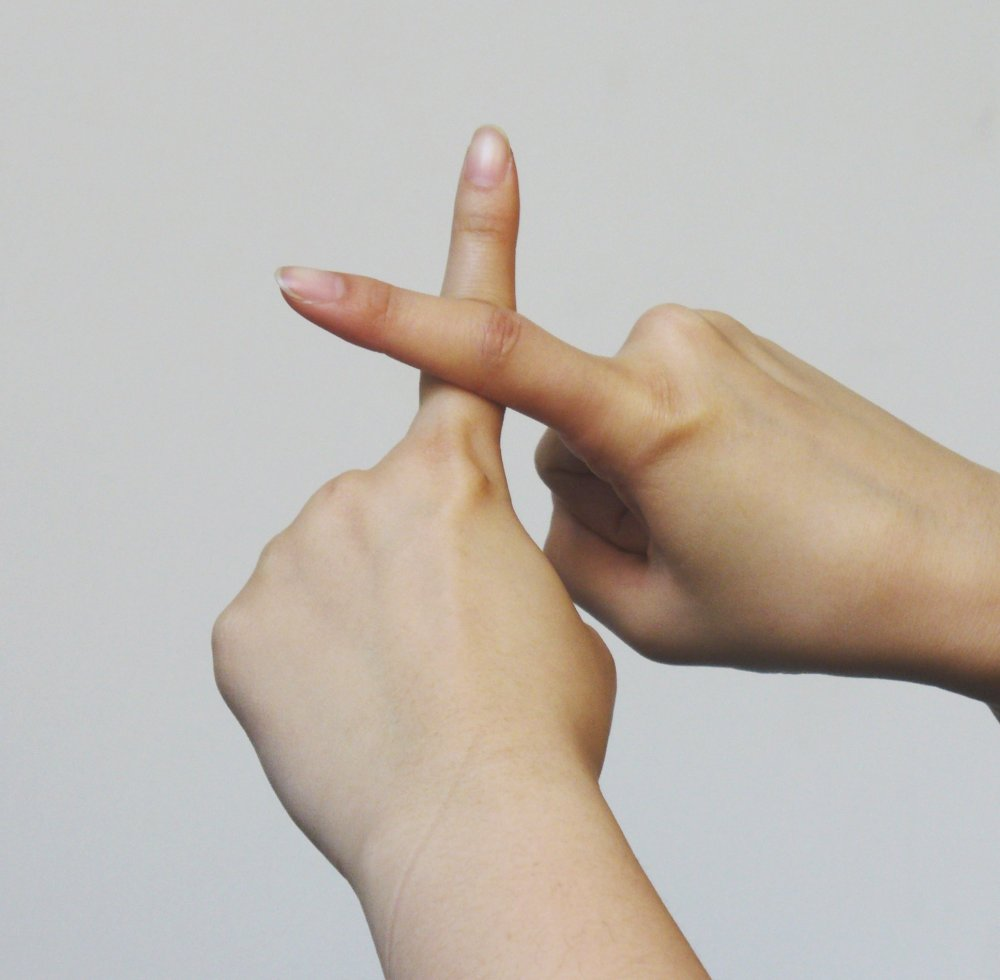
10

=== From 6 to 10 in Taiwan ===
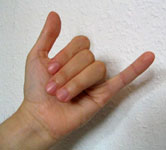
6

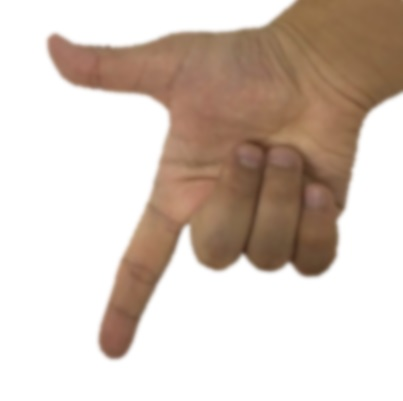
7

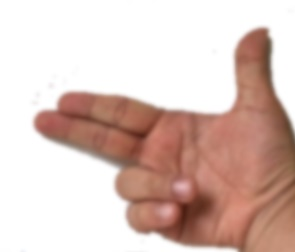
8

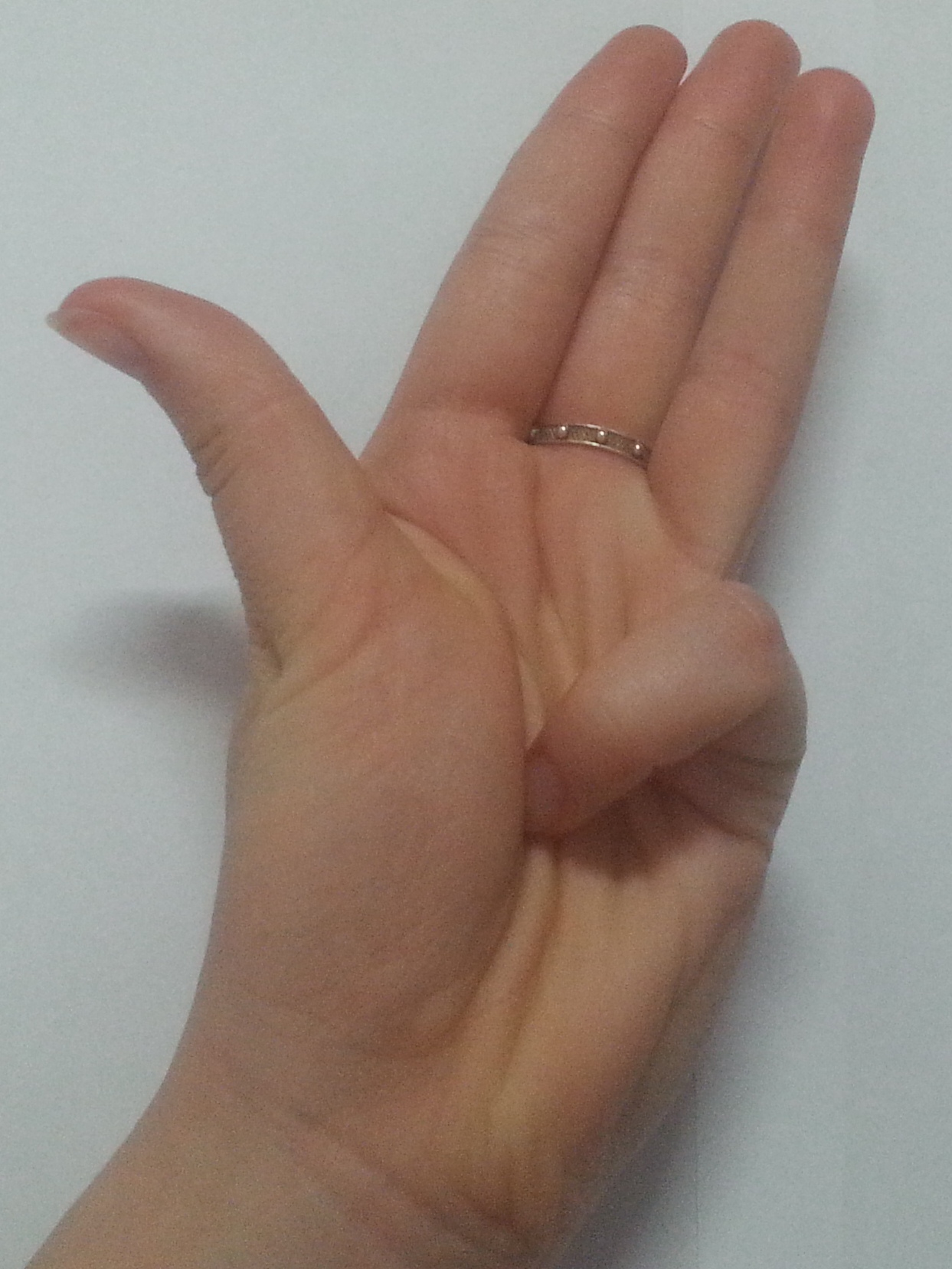
9

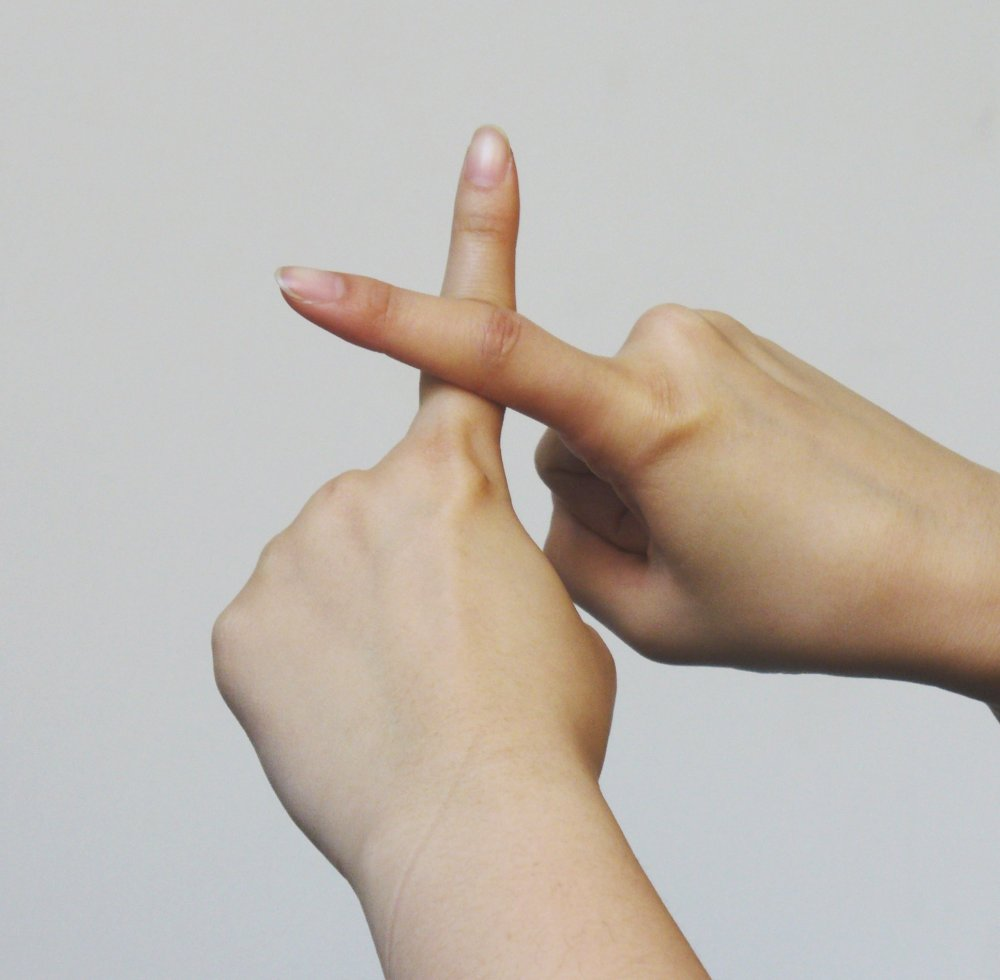
10

=== The digit 0 ===
The gesture of the digit 0 is used for showing numbers like 20, 30, 40, etc., where the left hand shows the tens digit and the right hand shows the digit 0.

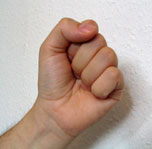
0 (or 10), used in North China

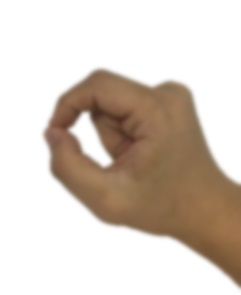
0, used in coastal South China

== See also ==
- Chinese numerals
- Finger-counting
- Finger binary
- Hand signaling (open outcry)
- Nonverbal communication
- Numbers in Chinese culture
- Sign language
