= The Mischief Makers =

- Type: Collective
- Industry: Community, environmental, social justice
- Founded: 2005
- Headquarters: Nottingham, United Kingdom
- Website: mischiefmakers.org.uk

The Mischief Makers are a group of activists and artists based in Nottingham, UK, who formed early 2005 as a creative response to the G8 Summit, held at Gleneagles Hotel, Scotland, in July that year. The collective uses creativity to support community, environmental and social justice campaigns, and activist groups. The group's aim is "to inspire people and empower them to identify challenges and take action in their local environment".

== Background ==
Geishas at the MPH march in Edinburgh, July 2005

Early 2005, a benefit event in aid of the tsunami disaster was organised in various venues around Nottingham. Two local artists made Geisha-like costumes and performed an interactive theatre piece on the streets, trying to get the public to interact with the costumes and the "wish fishes" to engage with the issues related to the disaster. Afterwards, the costumes were altered and used as an interactive way of engaging with people on the issues of debt, poverty and climate change as the Summit of the G8 was approaching.

During the spring of 2005, various kimono-making workshops asked people to "join the geisha of gaiety on a passionate mission of peace and progression, when 8 men think to meet undisturbed, unruffled and untroubled to decide upon the worlds future". A "Geisha Bloc" took part in the Make Poverty History march in Edinburgh on 2 July, and others took their costumes to the camp in Stirling for direct action planned to disturb the summit.

List of earlier actions

- One Drop in the Ocean, 20 January 2005
- Shakedown*05, 12 March 2005
- G8 ministerial meeting, Derby, 17 March 2005
- Protest for migrant and asylum rights, 2 April 2005
- Performance at Demo clubnight, 25 June 2005
- G8 Summit, Scotland, 2 July 2005 / 9 July 2005
- Hiroshima and Nagasaki 60th anniversary commemoration, 9 September 2005

== Projects ==
Bannerdrop in Sneinton, Nottingham, March 2006

=== Supporting the NAIL Campaign ===
Nottingham Against Incineration and Landfill stepped up its campaign mid-2005 after the proposed expansion of Eastcroft Incinerator was announced. The expansion has been controversial as Sneinton, the most affected area, has been dealing with various health problems as a consequence of the nearby incinerator. The Mischief Makers have supported the NAIL Campaign on numerous occasions with bannerdrops, awareness raising, fundraising and during demonstrations and protests with costumes, puppets and performance.

About the campaign: "NAIL (Nottingham Against Incineration and Landfill) was originally set up in 2002 by a group of local environmental campaigners. We decided to form a pressure group, when a woman who developed breast cancer approached members of Nottingham Greenpeace. She claimed that there was two other ladies, who shared her office for many years overlooking the incinerator plant, had also developed cancer, one of whom had died. They were believed that their condition was caused by their prolonged exposure to pollution from Eastcroft incinerator. The group developed and was joined by local residents of the Eastcroft Incinerator. We have since gained growing support, since the expansion announcement."

List of actions

- Market Square protest, 8 October 2005
- 1st Bannerdrop in Sneinton, 12 November 2005
- Rubbish Day Out 1, 3 December 2005
- Handing in petition, 6 March 2006
- 2nd Bannerdrop in Sneinton, 8 March 2006
- 3rd Bannerdrop in Sneinton, 8 March 2006
- Rubbish Day Out 2, 3 June 2006

=== Supporting the No Border Network ===
Solidarity Sister costumes, Sheffield, October 2005

In October 2005, a new piece called 'The Solidarity Sisters' was developed to support the work of the No Borders Network, whose aim is to spread the message of solidarity with refugees and those seeking asylum in the UK.

One Solidarity Sister explains: "We have appeared in these costumes a couple of times in Nottingham and in Sheffield. We dress in little white dresses, with one of us in lederhosen and hats and bags. It's about showing solidarity. It's more a sort of universal image. On the bands and the skirts there's lots of images of people holding hands. It's about spreading equality, friendship and acceptance. We look a little bit like aid nurses. Like it's about having a helping hand. Being there to support people. The dresses were made from reclaimed fabrics. They were used for car seat padding. It's good to be reusing stuff."

About the No Border Network: "The no border network is a tool for all groups and grass root organizations who work on the questions of migrants and asylum seekers in order to struggle along with them for freedom of movement, for the freedom for all to stay in the place which they have chosen, against repression and the many controls which multiply the borders everywhere in all countries".

List of actions

- Nottingham 'Noisy' Demo: Rights for migrants and asylum seekers, 2 April 2005
- Sheffield No Borders Tour, 15 October 2005
- Destitute Asylum Seeker vigil, 5 March 2006

=== The Art and Activism Caravan ===
Interview for National Albanian TV, Tirana, July 2006

Working with Roma children in Bitola, Macedonia, July 2006

The Art and Activism Caravan was a project initiated by the Amsterdam-based youth organisation European Youth For Action in which The Mischief Makers took part. Its idea was to "support and connect youth, campaign, community and activist groups, their actions and campaigns with creative forms of activism.". Also known as the 'AA Caravan' a group of around 10 people traveled from Greece via Macedonia, Albania, Montenegro, Serbia and Hungary to the environmental youth Ecotopia gathering in Slovakia. The Caravan worked intensively with numerous groups over a 3-month period.

List of groups involved

- Bitola Youth Forum (Bitola, Macedonia)
- Ecotopia (Zajezova, Slovakia)
- European Youth For Action (Amsterdam, Netherlands)
- In Stage (Belgrade, Serbia)
- Indymedia (UK)
- Kulturanova (Novi Sad, Serbia)
- Karahaber (Turkey)
- Medsos (Athens, Greece)
- The Mischief Makers, (Nottingham, UK)
- Mjaft (Tirana, Albania)
- Peti Parkic campaign (Belgrade, Serbia)
- Plagus M (Plav, Montenegro)
- Rebel Clown Army (Berlin, (Germany) and Antwerp, Belgium)
- Rhythms of Resistance (Berlin, (Germany))
- Stanipanikolektiv (Belgrade, Serbia)
- Undercurrents (Swansea and Oxford, UK)
- Valley of Arts (Kapolcs, Hungary)
- VideA (Turkey)

List of actions

- Action in support of Roma settlement in Novi Sad, Serbia, 23 July 2006
- Action for the opening up of Serbian borders in Novi Sad, Serbia, 22 July 2006
- Demanding better seating in local stadium in Plav, Montenegro, 12 July 2006
- An action for clean and reliable drinking water at the Ministry for Internal Affairs in Tirana, Albania, 5 July 2006

Ostrich in climate change protest, Selby, Aug 2006

=== The Climate Camp ===
The Camp for Climate Action, also known as the 'Climate Camp', was held in Barlow, Selby, North West Yorkshire, to push for action on the issue of climate change. Over 600 people came together for 10 days to follow workshops, share skills and take action. The camp was set up near Drax power station, the largest coal fired power station in Europe and the biggest single contributor to CO_{2} emissions in the UK. The Mischief Makers made a giant ostrich puppet which was taken on the 'kids march' to Drax Power Station on Thursday, 31 August 2006, and seized by the police. Chief Inspector Barry Smith told the BBC "a giant home-made ostrich had been seized by police, and found to be containing tools which could have been used by demonstrators to chain themselves to fences". More coverage from the Climate Camp can be found on UK Indymedia.

- Day of Action Against Drax Power Station, 31.08.06

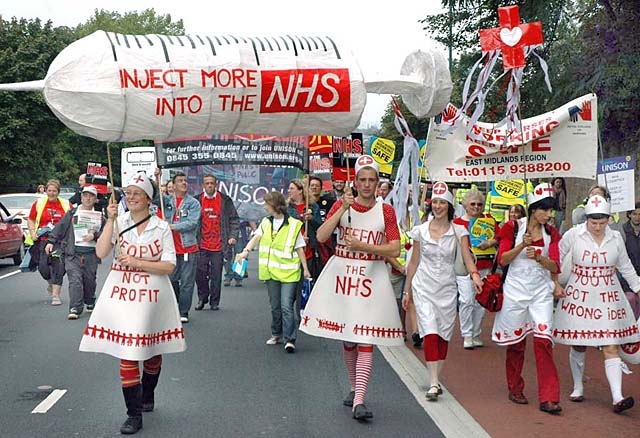
Giant syringe in demonstration against NHS privatisation, Nottingham, September 2006

=== Defend the NHS! ===
In September 2006, the Mischief Makers started to support the work of unions and other group opposing the cuts and privatisation of the UK's National Health Service (NHS). To add a creative element to the trade unions' work, a giant syringe was built and included in a "2000 people strong demonstration" through the City of Nottingham on 23 September.

- Mischief Makers build giant syringe in support of NHS march, 17.09.06
- 'Protect the Patients' NHS Nursing / Unison March Pics 1, 23.09.06
- 'Protect the Patients' NHS Nursing / Unison March Pics 2, 23.09.06
