= Hand signals =

Motion used to indicate intention in traffic

A trolley driver at Liverpool Street Station signalling a left turn on a platform during World War I

Hand signals are agreed gestures that people make with their hands or body to communicate in a non-verbal way. When used in traffic, hand signals are often used to convey driver's intention of their next movement. In some countries, hand signals can apply to any vehicle whose signal lights are missing or damaged. Hand signals are commonly used and applies to cyclists and motorists. Hand signals are commonly used to signal a left turn, right turn, overtaking, slowing or stopping.

== Left turn ==
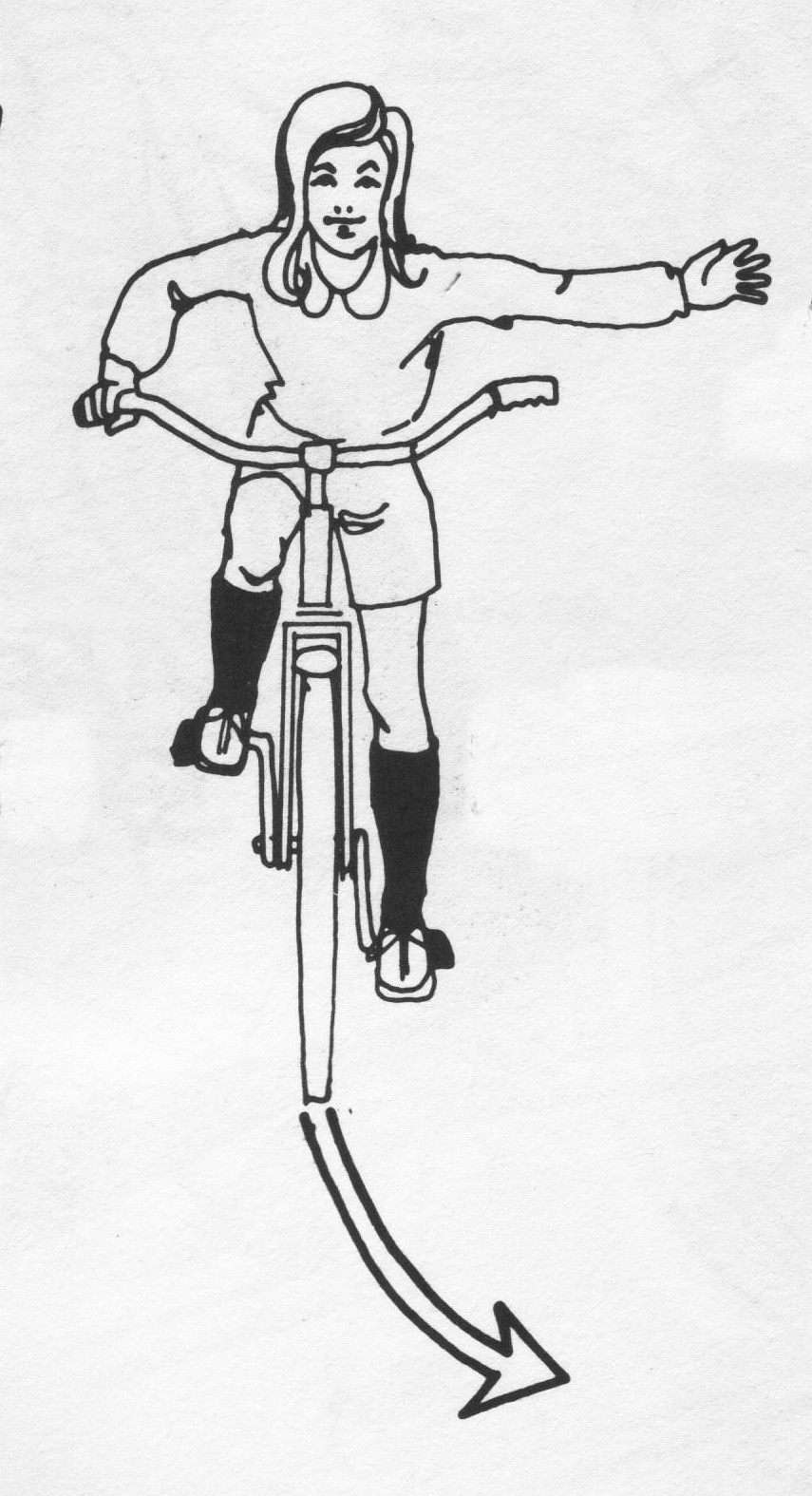
Left turn signal

=== All countries ===
To signal a left turn, the driver horizontally extends their left arm outward.

=== South Africa ===
The driver extends their right arm with the forearm pointing vertically downwards and moving in a circular anti-clockwise motion. Drivers of tractors, animal-drawn vehicles and two-wheeled vehicles may also extend their left arm horizontally with the palm facing forwards. Signal lights or turn indicators may be used in place of hand signals if installed.

== Right turn ==
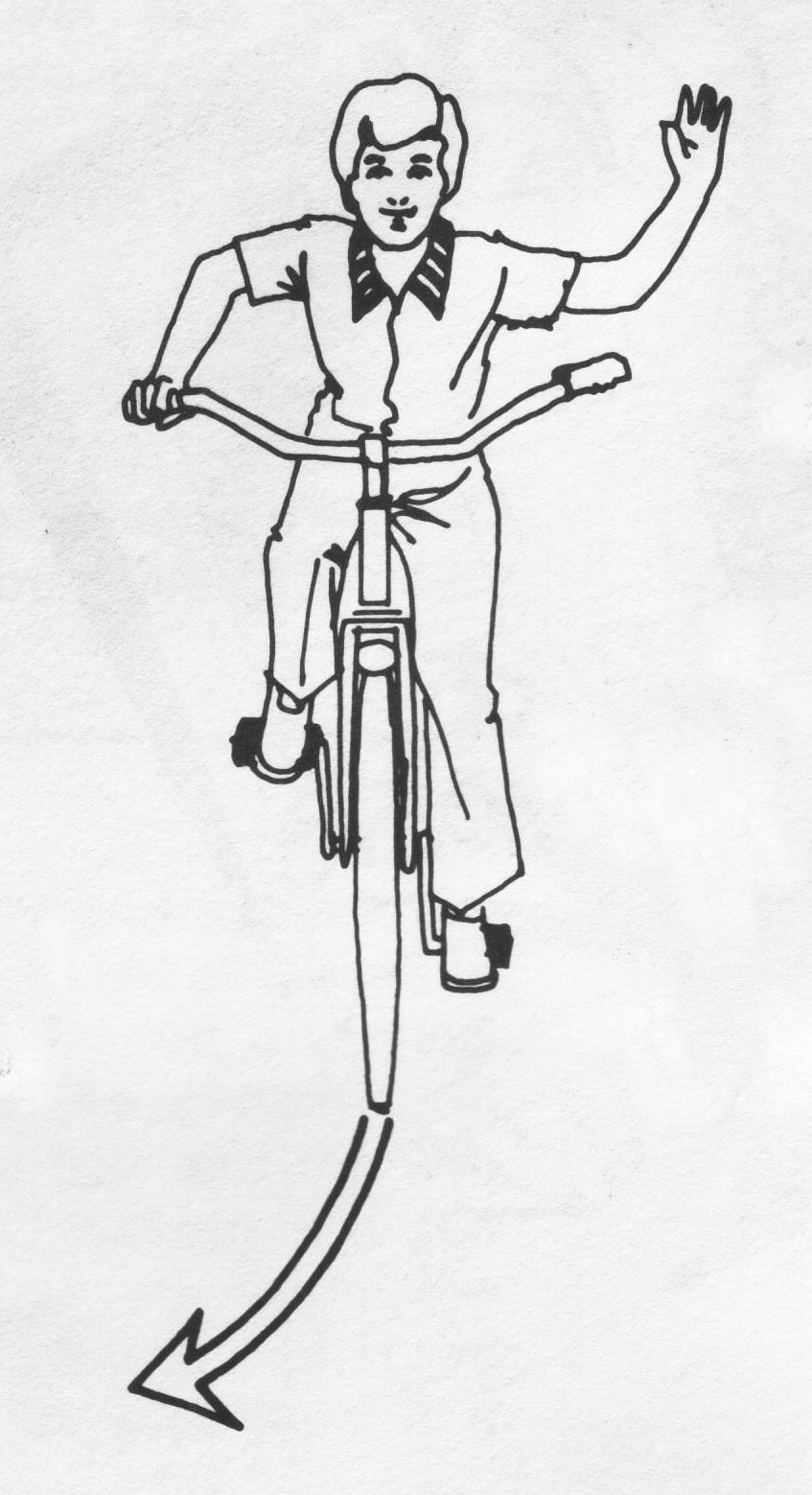
Right turn hand signal

=== US and Canada ===
There are two methods for signaling a right turn. The first, more commonly known signal is to extend the left upper arm out to the left, horizontally, and angle one's forearm vertically upward. The second method is to extend the right arm perpendicular to the body, pointing in the same direction as the intended turn. Some states do not recognize the right arm because drivers are taught to only look at the bicyclist's left arm for all signals, but most states allow the use of either arm.

The Uniform Vehicle Code in the US recognizes both signals. State traffic laws generally conform to the Uniform Vehicle Code, but exceptions may exist. Both signals are recognized in British Columbia, Canada.

=== South Africa and Denmark ===
The driver extends their right arm horizontally with the palm to the front. If a vehicle is fitted with turn indicators, they may be used instead.

This signal has the advantage of being more visible to affected traffic, specifically vehicles in the next lane to the right. It is also more easily understood by children.

== Overtaking ==
In right-hand traffic countries, the left turn-hand signal is used before normal overtaking to the left. Correspondingly, in left-hand traffic countries, a right-hand signal is used before normal overtaking on the right.

=== South Africa ===
A vehicle may signal a vehicle behind them to overtake them by extending the right arm below shoulder level, with the palm facing forwards, and moving the arm backwards and forwards.

== Slowing down ==
=== South Africa and Denmark ===
Sudden reduction in speed requires the same signal as stopping, (i.e. the extending the right arm is horizontally with the palm facing downwards and the hand rotating up and down at the wrist, see Stopping section). The driver is also permitted to extend their right arm horizontally with the palm facing down and move their arm in a vertical motion.

== Stopping or braking ==
US stop signal

=== UK and Ireland ===
To signal they intend to slow down or stop, the driver, cyclist or horse rider should extend their right arm slightly below horizontally with their palm facing downwards, then move it up and down.

=== US and Canada ===
The left arm is horizontally extended with the forearm angled downward.

=== Italy ===
The right arm is vertically extended with the palm facing forward. Cyclists use a different hand signal to indicate a right turn. When a cyclist wishes to turn right, they typically extend their right arm straight out to the right side of the bicycle.

=== Australia ===
The right arm is vertically extended with the palm facing forward. Alternatively, the right upper arm is extended horizontally with the forearm extended downwards, palm facing forward.

=== Denmark ===
Either arm is extended vertically. It is also common practice to extend the upper arm horizontally with the forearm extended downwards, palm facing forward.

=== South Africa ===
The right upper arm is extended horizontally, with the forearm vertical and palm facing forward as depicted in the US right turn signal above.

== See also ==
- Hand gestures
- Occupy movement hand signals
- U.S. Army hand and arm signals
- Outline of cycling
- Vehicular cycling
- Gang sign
