= Camp for Climate Action =

Environmental protest gathering

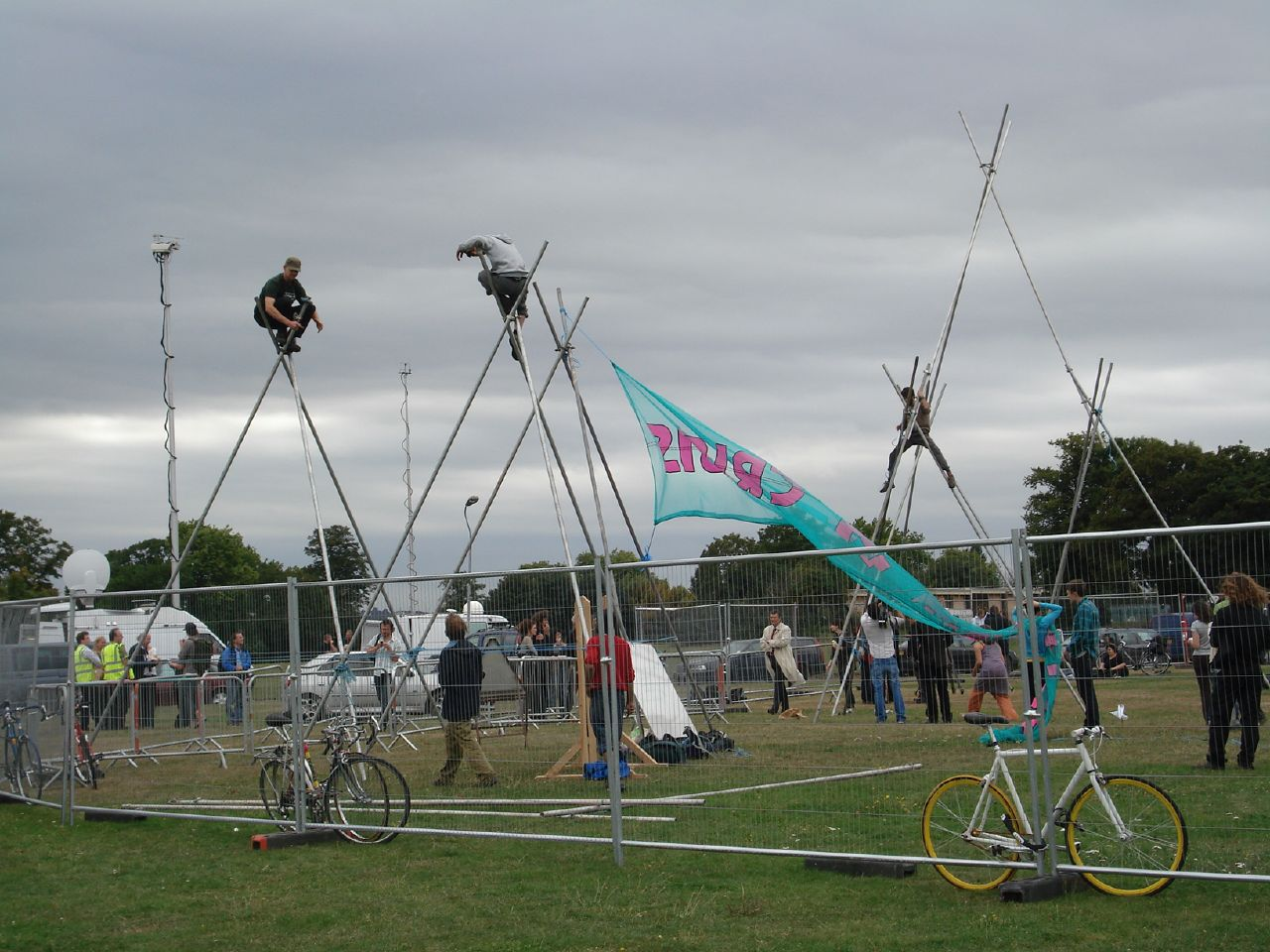
Setting up camp at Blackheath in August 2009

The Camps for Climate Action are campaign gatherings (similar to peace camps) that take place to draw attention to, and act as a base for direct action against, major carbon emitters, as well as to develop ways to create a zero-carbon society. Camps are run on broadly anarchist principles – free to attend, supported by donations and with input from everyone in the community for the day-to-day operation of the camp. Initiated in the UK, camps have taken place in England at Drax power station, Heathrow Airport, Kingsnorth power station in Kent, the City of London and The Royal Bank of Scotland Headquarters, near Edinburgh. During 2009 camps also took place in Canada, Denmark, France, Ireland, Netherlands/Belgium, Scotland, Wales and Australia.

The Camp for Climate Action, first came into being in 2006, after activists at the 2005 G8 conference in Stirling in Scotland mooted the idea.

== General ==
Electricity for the Camp is generated from solar panels

Camps are organised through the preceding year with a series of monthly meetings, previously held in Manchester, Nottingham, Oxford, Leeds, Bristol, London, and Talamh (near Glasgow).

Much of the material used to create structures for the camp is reclaimed waste from building sites which would otherwise have been sent to a landfill. Compost toilets, comprehensive recycling, grey water systems and a pedal-powered laundries. The site of the camp is divided into loosely bounded 'neighbourhoods', most corresponding to geographic region (one exception being the queer neighbourhood of the 2006 camp). Daily consensus-based meetings are held in each neighbourhood, with spokespeople sent to a central meeting.

Power for lighting, radios, mobile phones, sound equipment and laptop computers was supplied by solar panels and a wind turbine. Biodiesel from recycled cooking oil was available for vehicles. Cooking used conventional propane cylinders. In 2007 a satellite up-link was installed, together with a media tent with ten laptop computers, this was also used to send media to the press as well as Indymedia UK.

There is a strong emphasis on the use of bicycles and public transport, including a Bicycology tour from London via Lancaster.

As the United Nations has reported that "livestock is a major threat to environment" all food is vegan, mostly organic and locally sourced to minimise food miles, provided by communal neighbourhood kitchens, many associated with the Social Centres Network.

== List of Camps for Climate Action ==
Climate camps started in the UK but have now taken place in a number of countries

Action	Location	Date
Drax power station	North Yorkshire, England	August 2006
Heathrow Airport	London, England	August 2007
Kooragang#Kooragang Island	Newcastle, New South Wales, Australia	July 2008
Kingsnorth Power station	near London, England	August 2008
Climate camp in the city	London, England	April 2009
Coal Caravan	Northern England	May 2009
Mainshill wood	Scotland	August 2009
Ffos-y-Fran mine	Wales	August 2009
Antwerp Bulk Terminal (ABT) coal terminal	Antwerp, Belgium	August 2009
Aéroport du Grand Ouest	Nantes, France	August 2009
West Offaly Power station	Shannonbridge, Ireland	August 2009
Blackheath London 2009	Blackheath, London, England	August 2009
One of six 'climate action camps' across Canada	Edmonton, Canada	August 2009
Climate Camp Aotearoa (New Zealand)	Wellington, New Zealand	December 2009
Raffinerie de Normandie	Le Havre, France	July 2010
Royal Bank of Scotland Headquarters	Gogarburn, Edinburgh	August 2010

A camp happened in October 2009 at Helensburgh near Sydney, which is the site of Australia's oldest coal mine.

== Drax 2006 ==
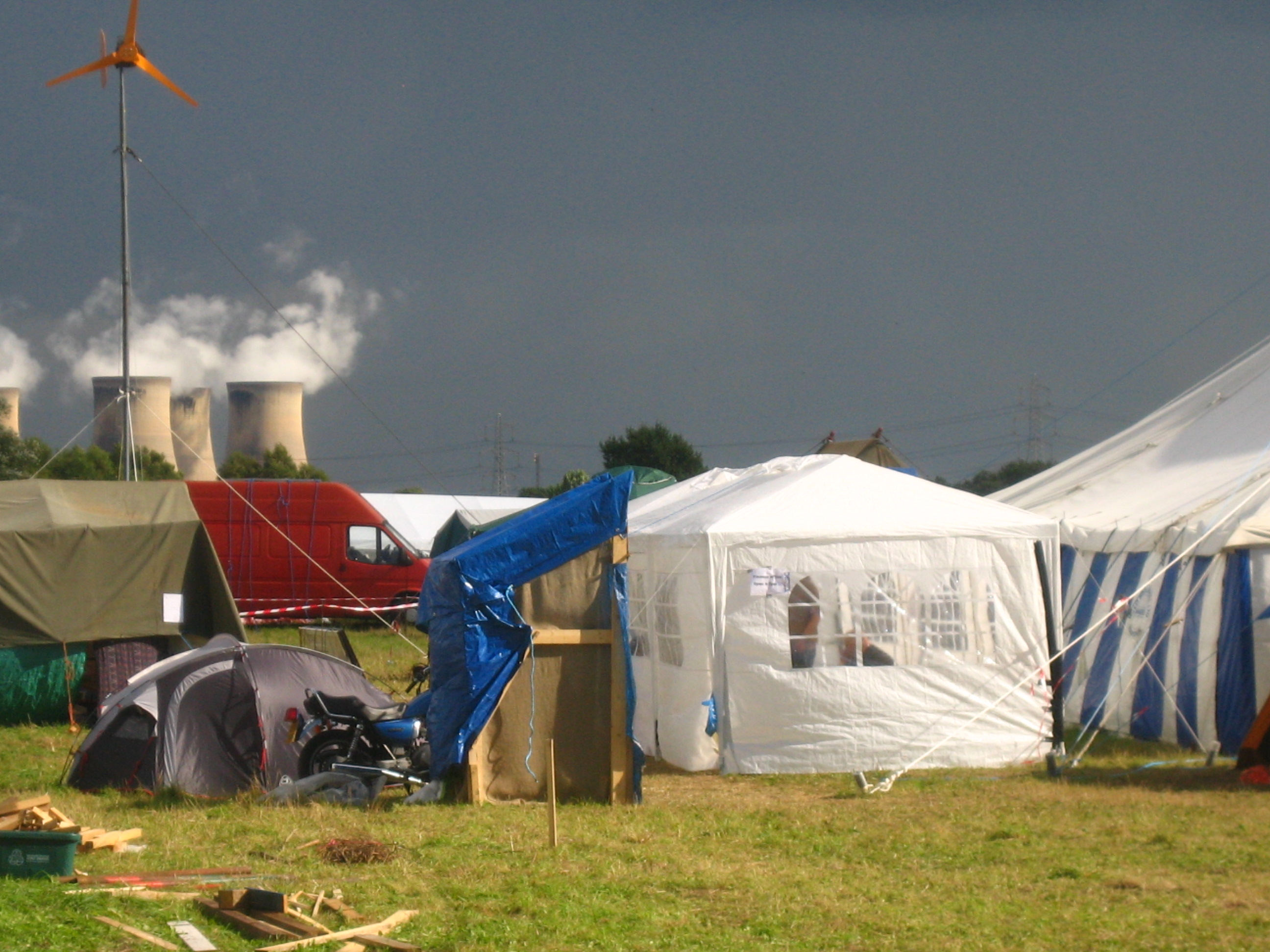
Climate camp with Drax power station in the background

The camp was on a squatted site in the Vale of York, situated close to several large power stations including Drax, a coal-fired power station which is the largest single emitter of carbon dioxide in the UK.

=== Day of action ===
On 31 August 2006, up to 600 people attended a protest called Reclaim Power converging on Drax and attempted to shut it down. There was a 'kids march' to Drax Power Station, with a giant ostrich puppet, made by The Mischief Makers. Two protesters climbed a lighting pylon at the edge of the Drax site and four others broke through the fence. Thirty-eight protesters were arrested. The police reported that work at the power plant was not disrupted.

Other protests arising from the camp included a protest against a nuclear power station in Hartlepool, Teesside.

=== Media response ===
The Guardian reported that the Camp marked a turning point in grass-roots campaigning against the causes of climate change.

=== Policing ===
It would later be revealed that police undercover office Mark Kennedy (police officer) had been involved in the planning for the protests and had been arrested twice during the camp, once at Hartlepool Nuclear Power Station where he locked onto a gate with a bicycle lock around his neck, and a second time close to Draw power station on the day of action, where he was beaten by fellow police officers and arrested for assault.

== Heathrow 2007 ==
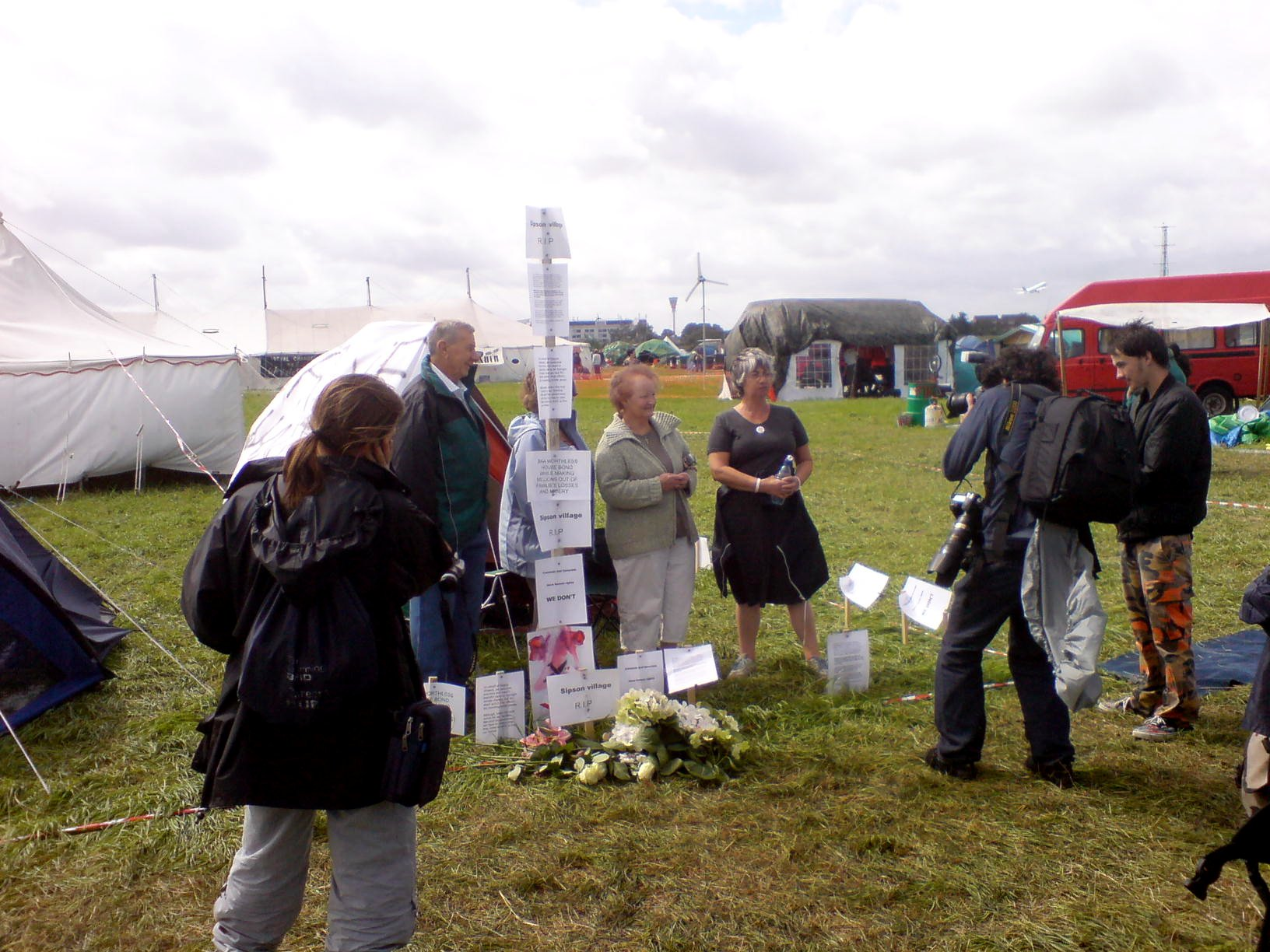
A 'memorial' to the village of Sipson which would be completely destroyed to make way for a new runway for Heathrow airport

The 2007 camp (51°29′20″N 0°26′43″W) ran from 14 to 21 August 2007 near London Heathrow Airport next to the village of Sipson on a disused sports ground owned by Imperial College London. Sipson would disappear from the map if the third runway at Heathrow was built.

During the camp there were also protests by Plane Stupid, who were injuncted from protesting at Heathrow. On 13 August Plane Stupid activists boarded a barge transporting an Airbus A380 wing and on 16 August at London Biggin Hill Airport.

Climate activists blockade British Airports Authority's headquarters for day of action.

On 19 August, the final day of the camp some 1000-1400 people took part in a 'Day of Action' and 200 people blockaded British Airports Authority HQ.

=== Injunction ===
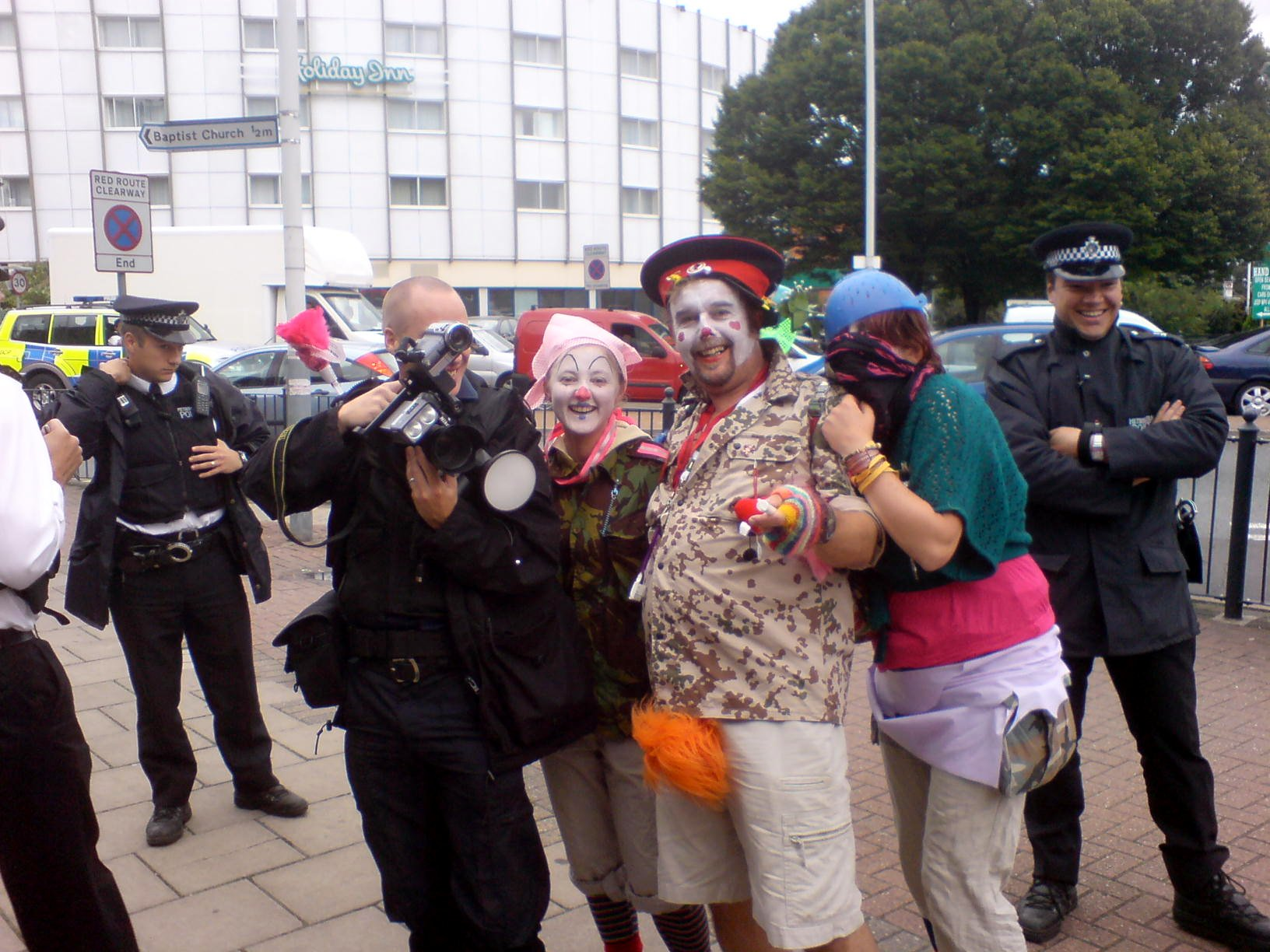
There was a relaxed atmosphere between police and protesters during parts of the camp

BAA's proposed an injunction against the camp.

The ruling was sought under the auspices of the Protection from Harassment Act 1997. In the end BAA won a more limited injunction and the camp went ahead.

=== Policing ===
Policing for the camp was estimated to have cost £7 million by Scotland Yard. The Evening Standard put the costs at £70 million.

In 2007 the police made preventive searches under Section 60 of the Criminal Justice and Public Order Act 1994. The Police carried out some searches, including some vehicles, under Section 44 of the Terrorism Act 2006, and took photos of protesters entering and leaving the camp. On Sunday 19 August there were scuffles between protesters and police officers outside the offices of BAA at Heathrow, which were being targeted in a day of direct action by some of the protesters.

=== Journalistic access ===
In relation to the 2007 the National Union of Journalists issued a public statement expressing "deep concern" over a proposed draft policy toward media access during its 2007 event. The camp media team replied to the NUJ criticism by stating: "The policy is a compromise that attempts to provide reasonable media access whilst respecting participants' right to privacy". On 9 August 2007 the proposed policy was amended to remove any possibility of blacklisting some journalists or giving sympathetic journalists longer access.

== Kingsnorth 2008 ==
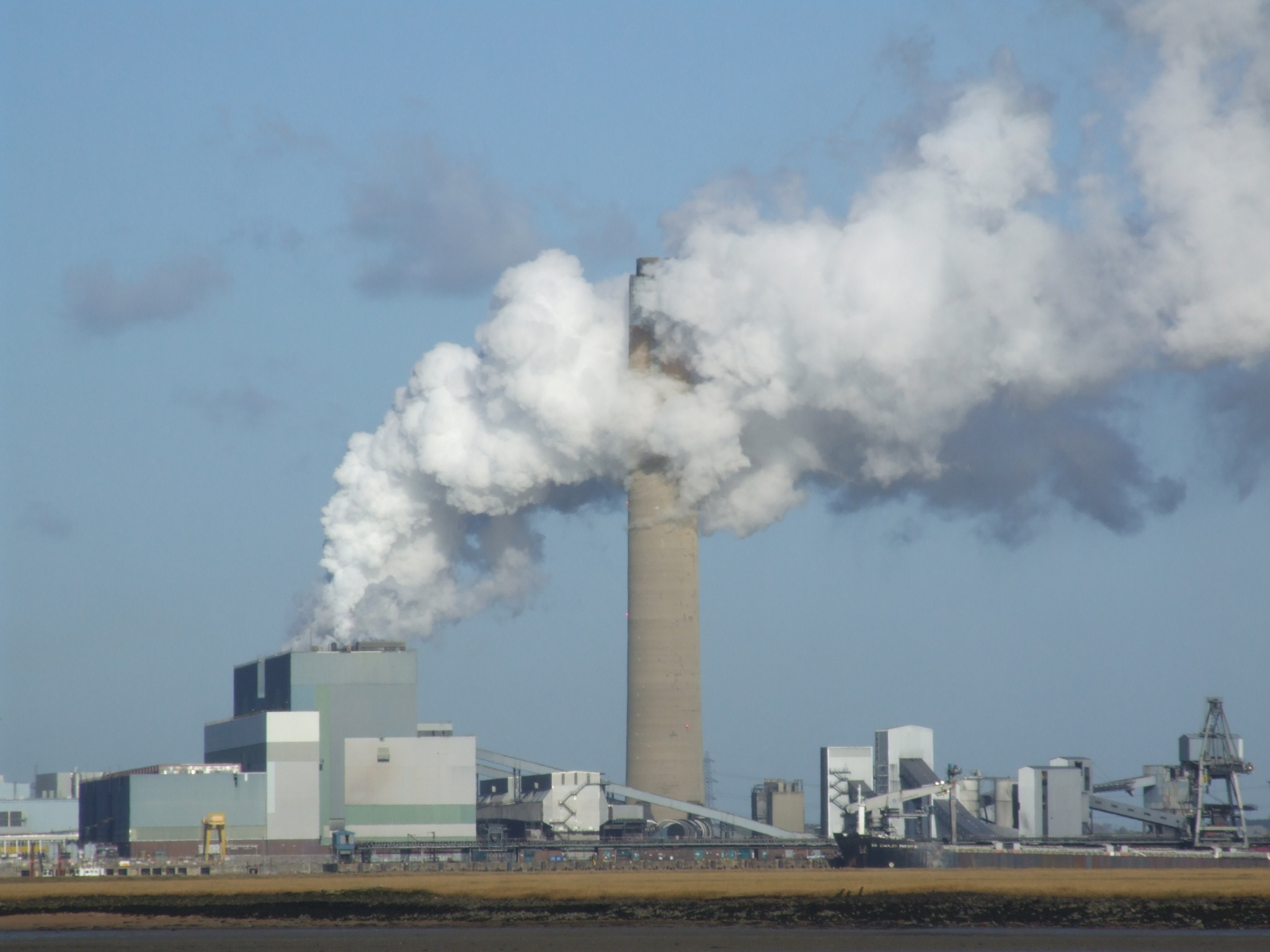
Kingsnorth power station, seen from across the River Medway estuary, Medway, Kent

The 2008 camp (51°26′23″N -0°32′54″E) took place in Kent, near E.ON UK's Kingsnorth power station, and run from 4 to 11 August to highlight E.ON's plans to build another coal-fired power station, which would be the first to be built in thirty years in the UK.

The action was also to highlight what is seen as an expansion to the fossil fuel economy, by corporations and government, and what activists claim is a demand for the opposite by scientific consensus. Furthermore, the camp attempted to challenge the businesses which will profit from the agrofuel industry, which they see as false solutions to the problems of climate change.

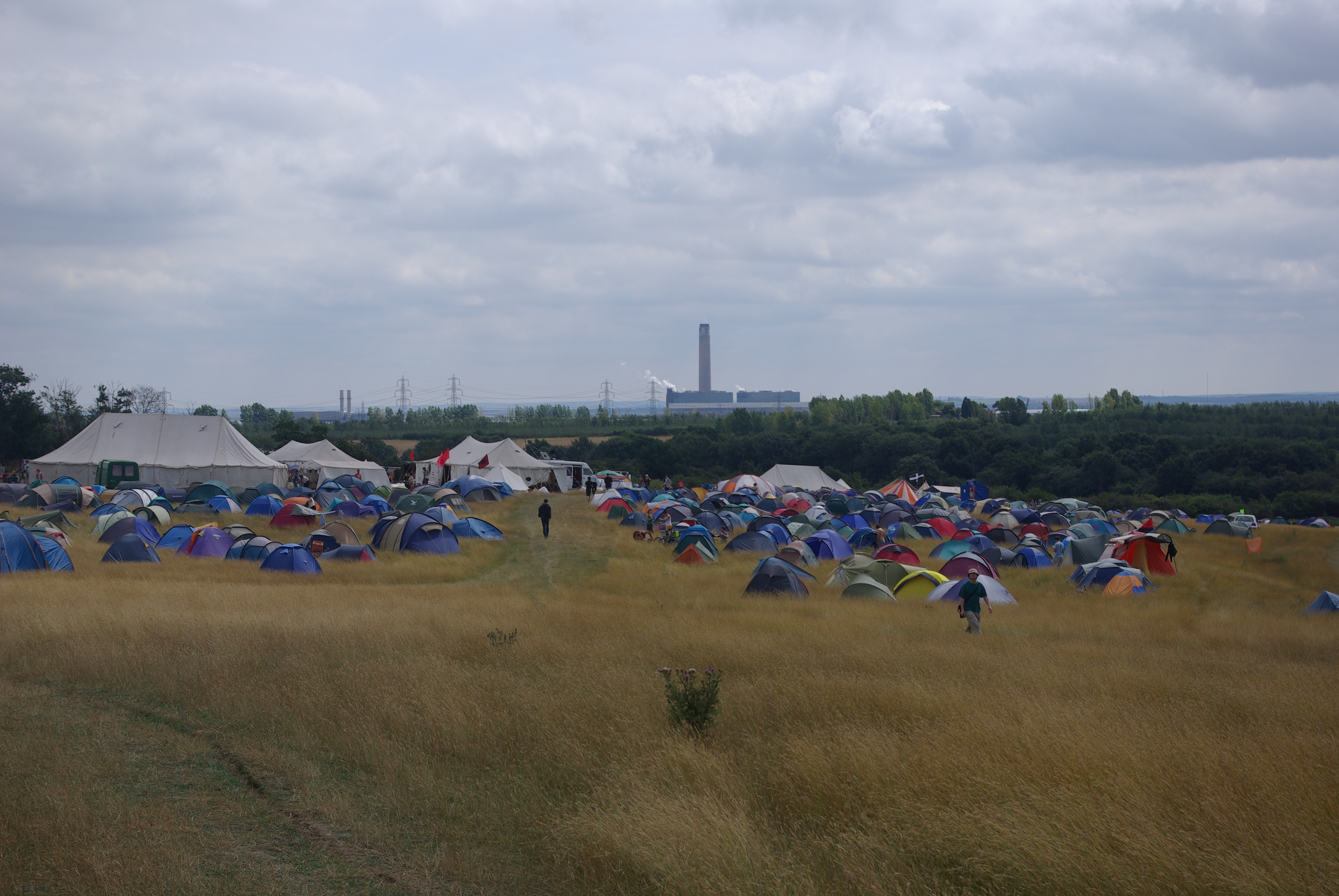
The climate camp, looking towards Kingsnorth power station

The camp began with a one-day event at Heathrow Airport, the site of the previous year's camp followed by a march across London to Kingsnorth power station, in common with seven other camps globally that were targeting coal.

Over 200 workshops and debates were held during the camp, including ones with George Monbiot, Caroline Lucas, Arthur Scargill and John McDonnell. Arthur Scargill, former General Secretary of the National Union of Mineworkers and Dave Douglass, attended the camp to represent many in the mining community who disagreed with the protesters' anti-coal position which they saw as a continuation of the state's assault against them stemming back to the UK miners' strike (1984–1985).

On Saturday 9 August the protesters attempted to shut down the power station. The day was organised to highlight the impact on climate change with activists marching to Kingsnorth power station. Violent scenes developed between the police and the protesters.

On 11 August 2008, several protesters from Oxford and Thames Valley Climate Action glued their hands to the doors of BHP Billiton's headquarters in Victoria, London to protest of the use of coal as a fuel.

=== Policing ===
1,500 officers were involved at an estimated cost of £5.9m, there were over 100 arrests and some 2000 'potentially harmful' items were confiscated At the time ministers at the time claimed that 70 officers had been injured in the course of their duties, though a Freedom of Information request later showed these included sunburn and wasp stings, and none were caused by protesters.

At the time local MP Bob Marshall-Andrews said that some policing was "provocative and heavy-handed" and Caroline Lucas MEP condemned police tactics, which included riot police, pepper spray and routine stop and search of everyone entering and leaving the camp. In March 2009 the Independent Police Complaints Commission said there was significant public concern at the policing of the camp which should be addressed. These included issues about misconduct, but also in regard to operational tactics including claims that officers used loud music at night to disrupt protesters who were trying to sleep.

Before the camp started police claimed they had found weapons hidden in nearby woods which included knives, a replica throwing star and a large chain and padlock. Assistant Chief Constable Gary Beautridge stated that while he believed the majority of the Climate Camp protesters to be peaceful, he was concerned that some had "more sinister intentions".

In June, 2009, the Guardian released video evidence of alleged brutality by police officers at the camp against two women. They belonged to the campaign group, Fitwatch, who campaign against the use of forward intelligence teams. They spotted several officers who did not have visible epaulettes and when they asked the officers to reveal their identities they were arrested.

== Camp in the City 2009 ==
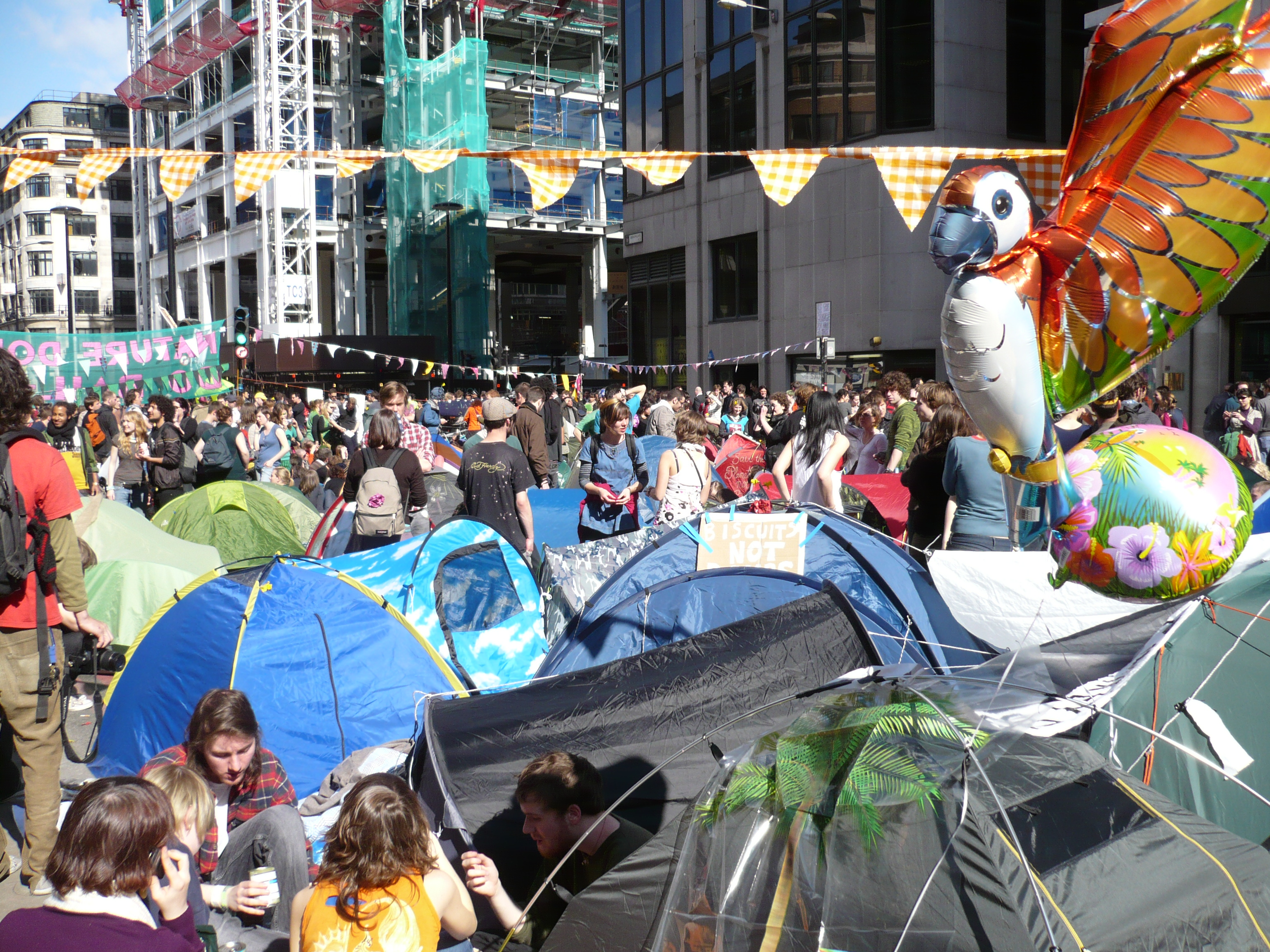
Climate Camp in the City 2009 - 1 April 4pm

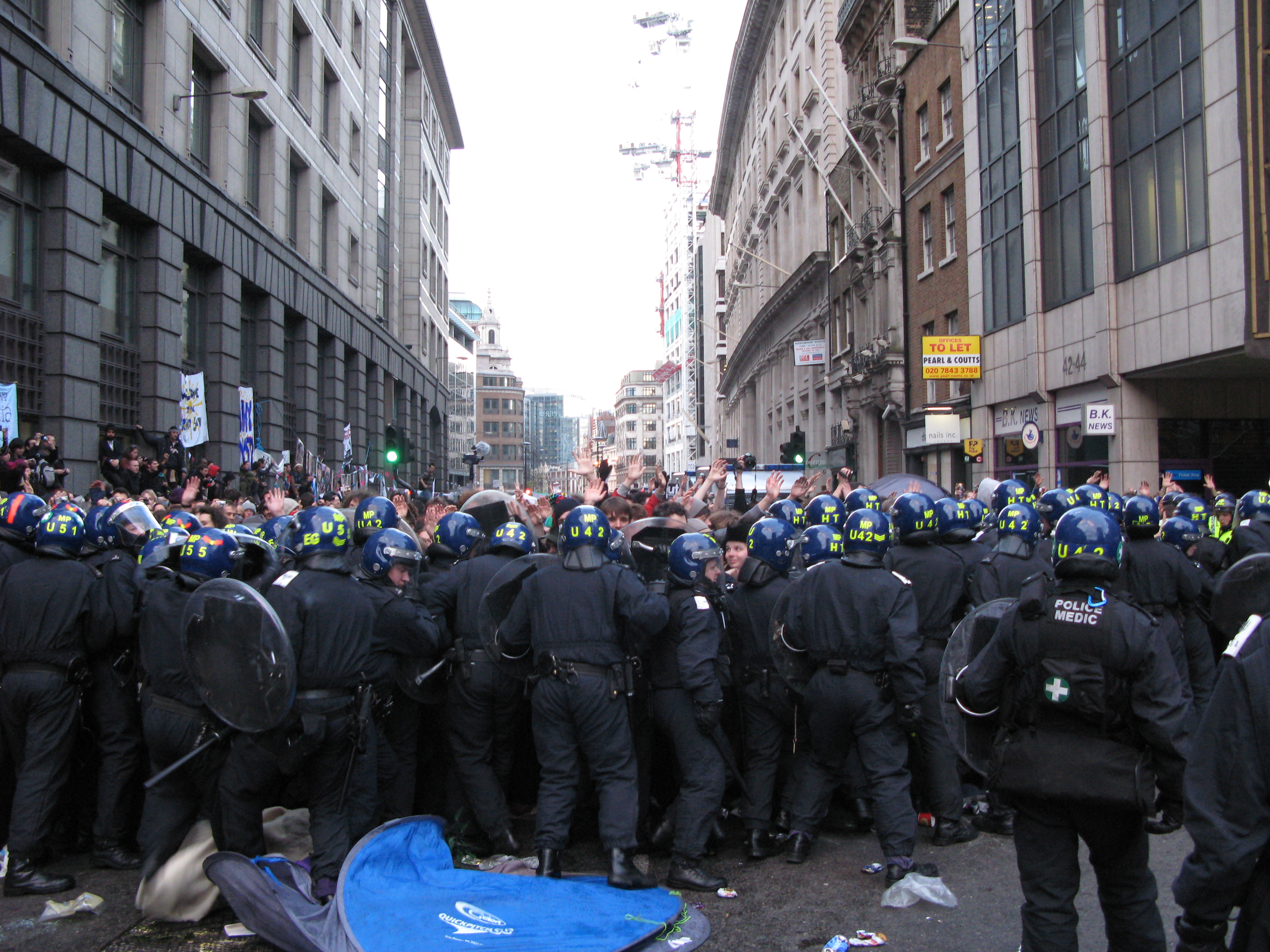
Riot police kettle protesters

The Camp in the City (51.5152°N 0.0825°W) took place on 1 April 2009 was one of a number of protests associated with the G20 London Summit. The aim was to draw attention to carbon trading. The camp took place outside the European Climate Exchange in Bishopsgate and was distinct from the G-20 Meltdown protest that took place outside the Bank of England.

Camp for Climate Action organisers agreed to meet with police and exchange contact details shortly before the protest. The meeting was arranged by Liberal Democrat MP David Howarth, who was to mediate at the meeting which was to take place at the House of Commons. Scotland Yard confirmed that a meeting was to take place with Bob Broadhurst (police commander) and Ian Thomas (chief superintendent).

The camp, which was intended to last for 24 hours, started at 12:30 pm when a camp was established in a section of Bishopsgate between Threadneedle Street and London Wall with tents set up and bunting across the road reading 'Nature doesn't do bailouts'.

At about 7 pm the police stopped allowing people to enter or leave the protest. The police advanced on protesters who put their hands in the air and resisted while chanting "This is not a riot" which is a tactic that emerged over the course of a number of Camp for Climate Action gatherings. There were scuffles with the police. Within the cordon people carried on playing music and preparing food and until the police began letting people leave at about 11:30 pm and cleared the area of the last protesters at about 2 am.

== Blackheath 2009 ==
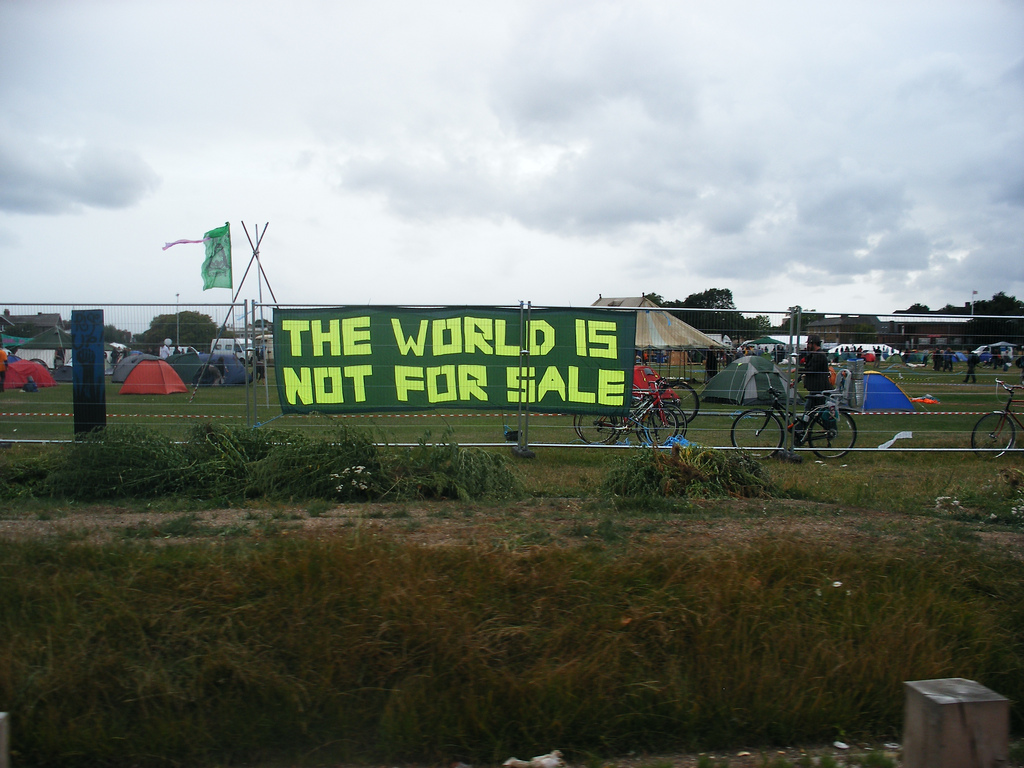
Banner on the temporary fence around the camp

The camp at Blackheath (51°28′17″N 0°0′14″E) was set up on 26 August on Blackheath Common, which was the site of the 1381 Peasants' Revolt and was due to run until 2 September. The organisers kept the location of the camp secret from the police until the first day of the camp. About 1000 people arrived on the first day with the police adopting a low-key 'community policing' approach and using Twitter for the first time to communicate with protesters and senior officers held five meetings with protesters to prepare for the event.

A number of protests at locations around London took place during the camp.

Shops and local pubs reported good business and police presence was keep very low profile and unobtrusive. The Telegraph described it as "the cheapest – and chic-est – date in the summer festival calendar". Climate Camp TV provided a view of the camp and the associated actions.

== Ratcliffe-on-Soar 2009 ==
Between 17 and 18 October 2009, protesters from Camp for Climate Action, Climate Rush and Plane Stupid, took part in 'The Great Climate Swoop' at Ratcliffe-on-Soar Power Station. The police arrested 10 people before the protest began on suspicion of conspiracy to cause criminal damage. Some 1,000 people took part, and during the first day groups of up to several hundred people pulled down security fencing at a number of points around the plant. Fifty six arrests were made during the protest and there were a number of injuries to Police and Protestors, including one policeman who was airlifted to hospital.

A spokesman for E.ON, which was granted a High Court injunction giving police the power to arrest anyone who tried to enter the site, said: "There aren't any winners or losers here. It was a less than peaceful protest. "Protesters were hurt, policemen were hurt and the power station carried on producing energy regardless. "I don't think it added anything to the debate on the UK's energy future."

After the event Julian Baggini, writing in The Times, criticised the protest arguing that climate change did not constitute a justifiable reason for civil disobedience. In response activists said that the urgency of responding to potential extreme climate change did indeed provide sufficient justification.

== Edinburgh 2010 ==
The camp was set up on 18 August in the grounds of The Royal Bank of Scotland Headquarters, Gogarburn, near Edinburgh, to protest against the banks involvement in financing environmentally damaging activities, particularly Canadian Tar Sands and ran until 25 August. The organisers took the site the day before the publicly announced date, in order to avoid the police. Actions took place across the week against RBS, and other companies involved in environmentally damaging industries, as well as various workshops on a range of environmental, social and climate change issues:

A number of protests at locations around Edinburgh took place during the camp.

Climate Camp TV provided a view of the camp and the associated actions.

== See also ==
- Environmental direct action in the United Kingdom
- Earth First!
- Plane Stupid
- The Mischief Makers
- Renewable energy commercialization
- Solar energy
- List of environmental protests
- List of large wind farms
- List of notable renewable energy organizations
- List of renewable energy topics by country
- Ende Gelände 2015
- Ende Gelände 2016
