= Hand signaling (open outcry) =

Hand signals used in financial trading

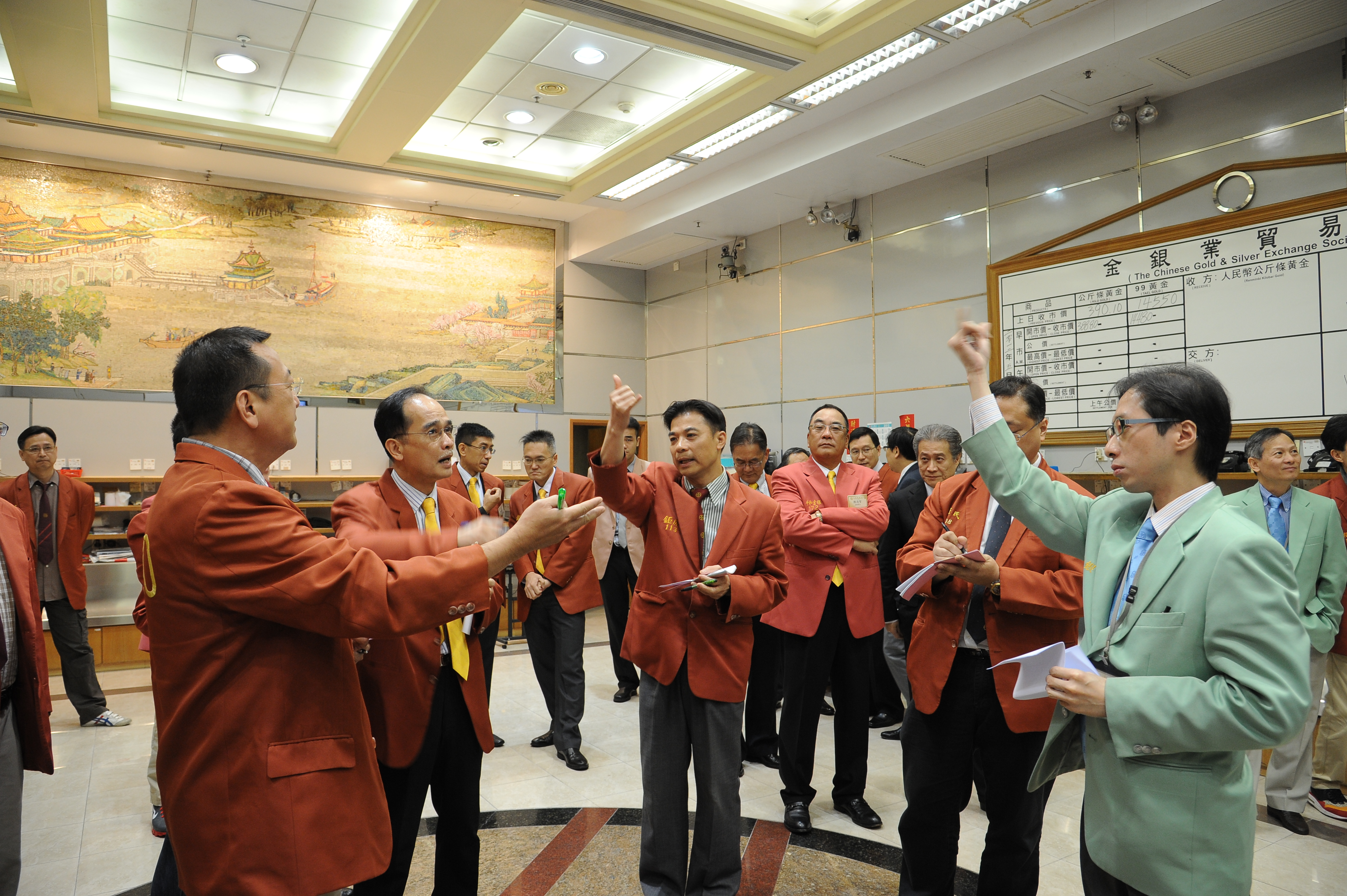
Hand signalling on the floor of the Chinese Gold and Silver Exchange Society

Hand signaling, also known as arb or arbing (short for arbitrage), is a system of hand signals used on financial trading floors to communicate buy and sell information in an open outcry trading environment. The system is used at financial exchanges such as the Chicago Mercantile Exchange (CME) and the American Stock Exchange (AMEX). The AMEX is the only US stock market to permit the transmission of buy and sell orders through hand signals as of 2003.

Traders usually flash the signals quickly across a room to make a sale or a purchase. Signals that occur with palms facing out and hands away from the body are an indication the gesturer wishes to sell. When traders face their palms in and hold their hands up, they are gesturing to buy.

Numbers one through five are gestured on one hand with the fingers pointing directly upwards. To indicate six through ten, the hand is held sideways, parallel to the ground. Counting starts from six when the hand is held in this way. Numbers gestured from the forehead are blocks of ten; blocks of hundreds and thousands can be indicated by repeatedly touching the forehead with a closed fist. The signals can otherwise be used to indicate months, specific trade option combinations or additional market information.

Rules vary significantly among exchanges; however, the purpose of the gestures remains the same.

== See also ==
- Chinese number gestures
- Finger binary
- Nonverbal communication
- Sign language
