= U.S. Army hand and arm signals =

Non-verbal communication

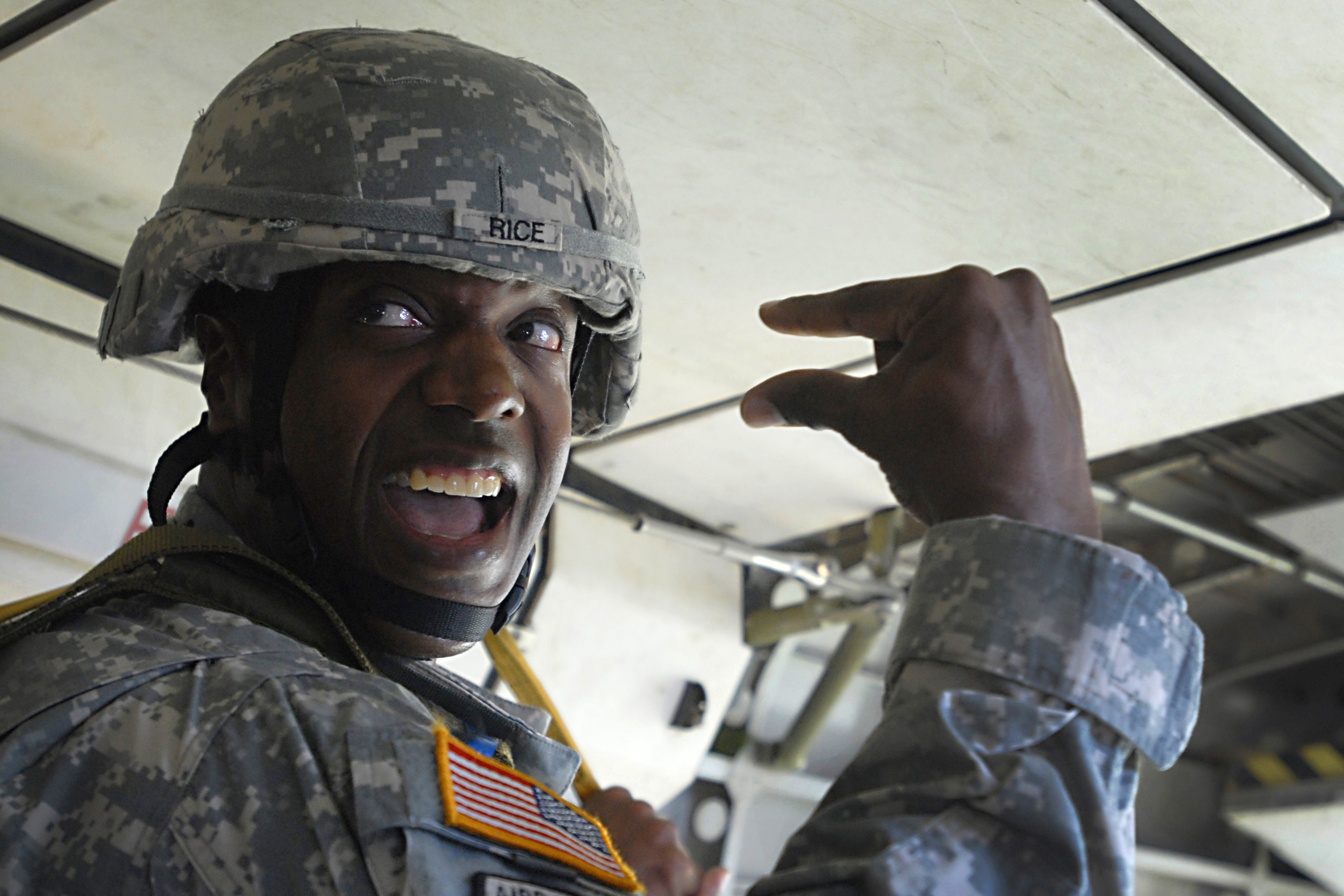
An Army Jump Master giving the hand signal for "30 seconds" over a drop zone

Hand and arm signals for United States Army use were first established in Field Manual 21-60. They were amended in Training Circular 3-21.60.

Hand and Arm signals are one of the most common forms of communication used by United States Army soldiers or group of soldiers when a radio silence is in effect or if the soldiers need to remain undetected.

Through the use of these signals military leaders, such as team leaders, squad leaders and platoon leaders, are able to keep command and control (C2) over their particular element. All new recruits are taught to use the proper hand and arm signals found in the FM. However, it is not uncommon for units to adopt and/or create their own signals. These signals ultimately become known as SOP or standard operating procedure.

Visual signals are any means of communication that require sight and can be used to transmit prearranged messages rapidly over short distances. This includes the devices and means used for recognition and identification of friendly forces.

== Types of visual signals ==
There are a number of ways that visual communication can be executed. The most common types are: hand and arm signals, flags, pyrotechnic, chemical-lights and ground-to-air signals. It must be known that soldiers and units are not limited to this select list.

== Limitations ==
Like all other types of signals, visual signals do have their downfalls and limitations. The first limitation one can see is the range and reliability. Within this limitation, visual communication can become greatly disrupted during periods of poor visibility or when the terrain restricts clear observation. The second limitation is misunderstanding. Many units do not follow specific Army doctrine (FM), but rather adopt their own SOP's. With thousands of different units, it is highly likely that individual unit SOP's will begin to overlap and cross each other. The third limitation is that visual signals are vulnerable to enemy interception; which can allow the enemy to use signals for deception purposes.

== Signals for combat formations ==
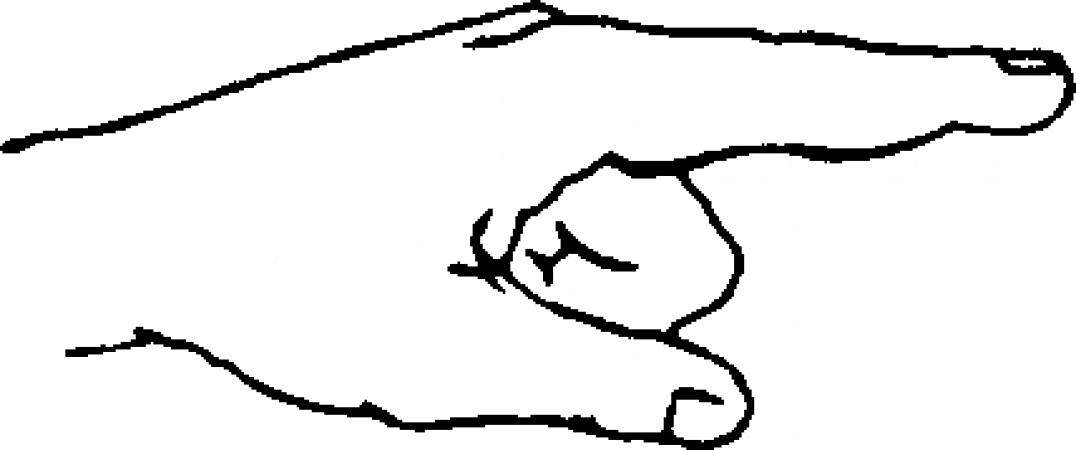
The ground hand signal: "Ready to fire: clear and ready to fire, indicated by pointing down range."

Leaders of dismounted units use arm and hand signals to control the movement of individuals, teams, and squads. These signals are used by infantry and by combat support and combat service support elements organized for infantry missions.

Leaders of mounted units use arm and hand signals to control individual vehicles and platoon movement. When distances between vehicles increase, flags (wrapped and tied) can be used as an extension of the arm to give the signals. From some vehicles (for example, Bradley, M2), the arm and hand signals will be distorted.

== See also ==
- Sign language
- Signal
