= The End of Protest =

2016 book by Micah M. White

- First edition
- Author: Micah White
- Language: English
- Published: 2016
- Publisher: Knopf Canada
- Pages: 336
- ISBN: 978-0345810045

The End of Protest is a book by Micah White, the co-creator of Occupy Wall Street and former editor of Adbusters magazine, published in 2016 by Knopf Canada. The End of Protest was a bestseller in Canada for five consecutive weeks according to BookManager.
