= Micah M. White =

American activist

- Born: 1982 (age 43–44); Milwaukee, Wisconsin, US
- Other name: Micah Bornfree
- Education: Swarthmore College (BA); European Graduate School (MA, PhD)
- Occupations: Activist, author, public speaker
- Known for: Co-creating Occupy Wall Street movement, popularizing the term "clicktivism"
- Notable work: The End of Protest: A New Playbook for Revolution
- Website: micahmwhite.com

Micah M. White is an American activist credited with being the co-creator of the original call for the Occupy Wall Street protests. His book The End Of Protest: A New Playbook For Revolution was published by Knopf Canada in 2016.

== Biography ==
White "was born to a Caucasian mother and an African-American father". He attended Grand Blanc Community High School in Grand Blanc, Michigan. There, he started a student atheists club, which the school principal objected to. As part of his experience he published an Op-Ed piece "Atheists Under Siege" in the July 21, 1999 issue of the New York Times. He was also interviewed on Politically Incorrect and received the 1999 Ruth Jokinen Memorial Student Activist Award from the Freedom From Religion Foundation. He earned a B.A. at Swarthmore College and an M.A. and Ph.D. at the European Graduate School.

At the time of the Occupy Wall Street protests, White was working as senior editor for Adbusters magazine with Occupy Wall Street co-creator Kalle Lasn. White ran the Adbusters Twitter account, and sent the first tweet to use the hashtag #OccupyWallStreet from that account. As the Occupy Wall Street movement gained momentum, White served as the group's unofficial publicist, though he was located in Berkeley, California, and not New York. After a group of Occupy Wall Street activists sought to raise funds for the movement by selling posters, White, who had already left Adbusters, took over Adbusters' Twitter account to declare support for the sale. After Adbusters regained control of the account, White referred to his actions as a "playful insurrection".

== Awards ==
In December 2011, the San Francisco Chronicle included White in a list of the "most fascinating people in the Bay Area 2011". In December 2014, Esquire Magazine named White one of the most influential people under 35 years of age. In 2018, White was awarded the Roddenberry Fellowship, Voqal Fellowship, and the National Endowment for the Humanities Fellowship at Bard College. In 2019, he was the Activist-in-Residence at UCLA. In the Fall of 2020, White co-taught a seminar at Princeton University.

== Political views ==
White is in favor of a transaction tax on international financial speculation, the reinstatement of the Glass–Steagall Act and revocation of corporate personhood. He is against advertisement and consumerism. He believes that "clicktivism", which denotes a form of internet-based activism and includes signing online petitions, is damaging to the possibility of political change.

In January 2020, White attended the annual meeting of the World Economic Forum in Davos, Switzerland. The meeting is often attended by business and political leaders, whom White protested when he was a part of Occupy Wall Street.
