= Alison Bethel-McKenzie =

American journalist and editor

Alison Bethel-McKenzie (born January 12, 1966) is an American journalist who is founding editor-in-chief of State Affairs. She was previously vice president of corps excellence at Report for America. She was the first woman and first person of African origin to head the International Press Institute.

In September 2021, Bethel-McKenzie married journalist John X. Miller Jr. in Washington, D.C., and returned to using her maiden name. She is now referred to as Alison Bethel.

== Biography ==
Bethel has over 25 years experience in journalism, as a reporter, bureau chief, senior editor and trainer, and is often cited in discussions about press freedom. She has been a guest lecturer or visiting professor at a number of colleges and universities, including the Indian Institute of Journalism and New Media in Bangalore, India; and Washington and Lee University in Lexington, Virginia. She has twice sponsored the Sadiq Press Freedom Award, conferred each World Press Freedom Day, on May 3, 2015, and May 3, 2017, by the Rural Media Network Pakistan.

Bethel served as director of the International Press Institute from 2010 to 2015 and the first American, first woman and first African American to reach this position since its foundation in 1950. Before joining the International Press Institute (IPI) in August 2009, she spent a year in Accra, Ghana, for the Washington, D.C.–based International Center for Journalists a Knight International Journalism Fellow, helping Ghanaian journalists improve their reporting skills in the run-up to the 2008 presidential election.

On April 29, 2019, Bethel resigned as the Society of Professional Journalists' executive director after 13 months.

On April 22, 2019, Bethel joined Report for America as its director of corps excellence. She officially began working with the organization on May 20 and was promoted to vice president in January 2021.

She is a contributor to Ms Magazine. and National Geographic Magazine.
