= Irish protests =

Irish protests may refer to:

== Past protests ==
- Blanket protest
- Dirty protest
- 2008 protests after government budget delivery, including actions by farmers, pensioners and students
- 2010 student protest in Dublin, the largest student protest for a generation
- March for a Better Way, held following admission of EU/ECB/IMF troika
- Vita Cortex sit-in, 2011-2012 action taken by workers in Cork
- Irish anti-immigration protests
- 2026 Irish fuel protests

Occupy movement

- Occupy Cork
- Occupy Dame Street
- Occupy Galway

== See also ==
- List of road protests in the UK and Ireland
