= 2010 student protests =

2010 student protests may refer to:

- 2010 UK student protests, a series of demonstrations opposing planned spending cuts to further education and an increase of the cap on tuition fees in England
- 2010 student protest in Dublin, a demonstration opposing a proposed increase in university registration fees, further cuts to the student maintenance grant and increasing graduate unemployment and emigration levels from Ireland
