= The Republic of Ireland and the World Bank =

Ireland joined the World Bank (and the International Monetary Fund, IMF) on August 8, 1957, and has continued to be a member since then. A majority of the money loaned to Ireland from the World Bank was put towards infrastructure projects, such as power and education. Ireland was able to pay back these loans in the predetermined time frames with little to no issue.

== Ireland: Basic Economic Data ==
After World War II, much of Europe was struggling after expending itself fighting. Once the dust had settled, Ireland, like other countries, joined the World Bank to procure loans to rebuild their economies and infrastructure.

Like a most countries, Ireland was affected by the 2008 financial crisis. This was caused by the U.S. and European banks pulling back their international loans due to the 2008 financial crisis. Countries that had borrowed heavily from abroad were negatively affected, especially those whose financial systems were vulnerable because of their own economic issues (i.e. housing bubbles, large currency amount deficits, financial excesses).

== World Bank in Ireland ==
Ireland's interaction with the World Bank only spanned from 1969 to 1976, borrowing a sum total of 152.5 million US dollars. Eight projects were created, with a small majority focusing on power infrastructure. The loans given were given through the child organization of the World Bank; the International Bank for Reconstruction and Development (IBRD). The IBRD is "a global development cooperative owned by 189 member countries" that was developed after the end of World War II to rebuild Europe and now helps reduce poverty in needing countries. This is the only branch Ireland has received financial support from (the other sibling organizations including the International Development Association (IDA), the International Finance Corporation (IFC), and the Multilateral Investment Guarantee Agency (MIGA)).

World Bank Loans (Earliest to Most Recent)
Project	Summary and Purpose	Approval Date / Closing Date	Commitment Amount (US$)
Power Project	Pump storage project to support peak loads and allow the current thermal plant to function more efficiently.	March 18, 1969 / March 31, 1974	14.50 million
Power Project (02)	Construct an oil-fired facility at the Tarbert generation station to increase efficiency.	March 2, 1971 / March 31, 1976	20.00 million
Industrial Credit Corporation Project	Finance industrial enterprises to support investment projects.	May 4, 1971 / September 30, 1976	10.00 million
Education Project	Provide funding to construct and support numerous educational institutions (i.e. secondary schools, colleges, education centers).	August 3, 1971 / December 31, 1978	13.00 million
Power Project (03)	Construct an oil-fired electrical generating unit and extending transition lines.	February 22, 1972 / March 31, 1977	15.00 million
Livestock Project	Assist agricultural production of beef and pig meat and finance farm development.	June 14, 1973 / December 29, 1978	25.00 million
Education Project (02)	Provide funding to construct and support numerous education institutions and rebuild inadequate facilities in both urban and rural areas.	January 15, 1974 / December 31, 1981	25.00 million
Industrial Credit Corporation Project (02)	Support and finance development projects in the industrial and distributive sectors and small-scale development enterprises.	August 19, 1975 / December 31, 1981	30.00 million

The status of all projects is fully repaid, and Ireland has not used the World bank since the end of its second Industrial Credit Corporation Project in 1981. Ireland has also not appeared in any of the World Bank Annual Reports since 1981, where they last had only 0.29% of the total voting power (the United States ranked first with having 769,139 votes, or 21.35%). After paying off these loans, Ireland experienced an upward trend of continuous growth until the Post-2008 Irish economic downturn.

== Selected Projects ==
Four types of projects were focused on in the time frame between 1969 and 1981; education projects, industrial credit corporation projects, livestock projects, and power projects.

=== Education Projects ===
Both education projects worked on reforming secondary education. The first project included created six state and eighteen community secondary school, one regional technical college, one secondary technical school, one college of commerce, and thirty agricultural education centers. These schools would be equipped with technical assistance for specialists in educational facility planning and development during the use of this loan. This funding was also to be used to develop and implement systemic approaches to design and industrialization of educational buildings and their add-ons. The second education project had a focus on rural education and expanding previous educational institutions. Fourteen new secondary schools which would create 9,660 student places and five industrial training centers to create 7,280 student places. These new schools replaced 27 obsolete schools in rural areas and 620 industrial training student spots that were housed in four inadequately housed centers. The National Institute of Higher Education (NIHE) gained the funding to provide new teacher training facilities. Also, the Faculty of Agriculture was moved to the main campus of University College, Dublin.

=== Industrial Credit Corporation Projects ===
These projects provided loans for investment projects in Ireland, such as providing more funding for the ICC. A large majority of these projects were based in industrial and distributive sectors, but specifics were not provided.

=== Livestock Project ===
This loan was used to meet the rapidly expanding export market for beef and pig meat products, improve the structure of farming, and raise the incomes of small farmers. It would also create a Project Unit that would control what profits were put towards paying off the farm development loan.

=== Power Projects ===
There were three different loans all for power projects. The first was to create a pumped storage project to support the needed peaking capacity in the most economical fashion. This was the chosen path because it was the least-cost alternative when compared to gas-turbines and base-load steam plant additions. The second power project was to install an extension to the Tarbert generating station providing a financial return rate of twenty-eight percent, which is a higher rate of return than the existing thermal capacity. The third power project was another addition to the Tarbert station; adding another electrical generating unit with the proper equipment.

== Future Involvement in National Money ==
Ireland has not used the World Bank since its last project, but heavily used the European Union and the IMF for loans totaling 67.5 billion euros (about 40 percent of Ireland's economy) to re-stabilize their economy after 2008
