= Occupy Cork =

Protest group against economic inequality

- Part of the Occupy movement and anti-austerity protests in Ireland
- Date: From 15 October 2011 to 13 March 2012
- Location: Cork
- Caused by: Economic inequality, corporate influence over government, Populism, inter alia.
- Methods: Demonstration; Occupation; Nonviolent protest; Street protest; Internet activism
- Status: Ended

Occupy Cork was a peaceful protest and demonstration against alleged economic inequality, social injustice and corporate greed taking place on the junction of the Grand Parade and South Mall and at the NAMA-listed Stapleton House on Oliver Plunkett Street in the Irish city of Cork. The group occupied Stapleton House after receiving the keys to the building on 25 December 2011. The camp was dismantled on 13 March 2012.

== Timeline ==
The protest at its original location had been going on for months, with a camp at the junction of the Grand Parade and South Mall in the city centre since summer 2011.

On 15 October 2011, simultaneous protests took place in Cork and Galway regarded by local and national media as having mimicked Occupy Wall Street (New York) and Occupy Dame Street (Dublin). The protestors organised a number of demonstrations, including a 'teach-in' in AIB's branch on the South Mall; where a local schoolteacher held a maths class with primary school children in the front lobby of the bank, before the arrival of the police precipitated a 'recess'.

On the evening of 3 January 2012, it was announced that a vacant six-storey NAMA-listed building on Oliver Plunkett Street had been taken over after it was gifted to the people of Cork. An anonymous donor reportedly left the keys to the building under the Christmas tree on Grand Parade on 25 December. The Garda Síochána (police) visited the occupied building, and then left again soon afterwards.

The building, unused since a part-demolition and refurbishment undertaken in 2008, had been cleaned by its occupiers. The occupiers released an online video chronicling their takeover of the building.

On 8 January 2012, there was a céilí mór (a "big" céilí) in the afternoon to raise funds.

The Cork City Community Resource Centre intended to open in the occupied building on Monday 23 January 2012, after an open day. The facility was expected to include classrooms, a music school, health facilities, a library, a bookshop, a café, a crèche, and a number of free initiatives for the public, including internet access, advisory and counselling services.

The camp was dismantled on 13 March 2012.

== Responses ==
Fine Gael politician Des Cahill described the protest as "attention seeking". Former Green Party senator and party chairman Dan Boyle described the manoeuver of 3 January as an "interesting development" and suggested that it was a legal and "legitimate protest".

== See also ==
- Anti-austerity protests in Ireland
- List of Occupy movement protest locations
- Post-2008 Irish banking crisis
- Post-2008 Irish economic downturn
