= Vita Cortex sit-in =

2011–2012 protest in Cork, Ireland

- Part of anti-austerity protests in Ireland
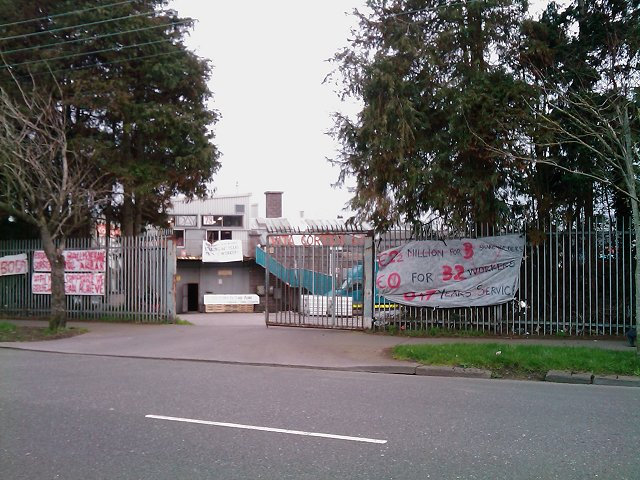
- Signs outside the Vita Cortex premises in March 2012
- Date: From 16 December 2011 to Thursday 24 May 2012
- Location: Cork, Ireland
- Caused by: Redundancy without pay
- Methods: Demonstration; occupation; Non violent protest; street protest; Internet activism
- Status: ended the 161st day of the sit-in

The Vita Cortex sit-in was a peaceful protest at the Vita Cortex plant on the Kinsale Road in Cork, Ireland, which began on 16 December 2011 after workers were made redundant without pay with immediate effect. The dispute led to nationwide protests, television appeals and debates in Dáil Éireann. According to the trade union UNITE, the dispute was part of a growing trend of workers being "left in the cold" after being made redundant.

The staff had worked for a total of 847 years for Vita Cortex, with the most senior employee having worked there for 47 years. The strike received support from, among others, the Cork senior hurling team, former President of Ireland Mary Robinson, human rights campaigner Noam Chomsky, international soccer player Paul McGrath, musician Christy Moore, film and theatre actor Cillian Murphy, and Manchester United manager Sir Alex Ferguson.

The 160-day sit-in was ended in May 2012, after the workers started receiving redundancy payments.

== Timeline ==
=== December ===
Vita Cortex Industries produced foam for the furniture and packaging industries. On 15 December 2011, staff were told that the company was to close the following day, and that they would be made redundant with no financial recompense. Vita Cortex Industries blamed the National Asset Management Agency (NAMA) for the situation.

On 16 December, workers began a sit-in at the plant. The sit-in was non-stop, with workers sleeping overnight throughout. Members of the public provided food to the workers and offered shower facilities. The sit-in continued over Christmas and into the new year.

Lord Mayor of Cork Terry Shannon and a delegation from SIPTU visited the workers during December 2011.

=== January ===
The workers were interviewed on The Late Late Show on 6 January 2012. Christy Moore later said that watching this moved him to perform a show in solidarity with the workers.

On 11 January 2012, the Labour Relations Commission (LRC) intervened. That day also saw Cork senior hurling coach Jimmy Barry Murphy visit the workers to present them with a signed Cork hurling jersey and pledge the support of him and his team for the workers.

On 12 January, hundreds of people, including Minister for Social Protection Joan Burton, protested outside Leinster House in Dublin, in solidarity with the redundant workers. Hundreds of people also protested in Cork two days later.

On 19 January 2012, linguist and human rights campaigner Noam Chomsky sent an e-mail message "to the workers of Vita Cortex, Cork, Ireland" in which he commended their "courageous and honourable actions". Former President of Ireland Mary Robinson also sent her support, writing: "I have always supported the right of workers to be treated fairly. I sympathise with your desire and that of your co-workers to get a fair deal."

=== February ===
On 11 February 2012, thousands of people marched through Cork city centre in solidarity with the Vita Cortex workers, and on 13 February, Sir Alex Ferguson telephoned Jim Power to express his support, drawing parallels to his involvement in an apprentices' strike in Glasgow in 1961.

On 17 February, musician Christy Moore performed a sell-out show in the Triskel Arts Centre in support of the sit-in. He dedicated his song "Ordinary Man" to the workers, calling their treatment "obscene". On 18 February, soccer international Paul McGrath visited the factory to declare his support.

February also saw Hollywood actor Cillian Murphy declare his support, writing about his "admiration to you all for the courage and commitment you are displaying in your sit-in. To everyone following this situation from the outside it is more than clear that you have right on your side and that what you are highlighting is hugely important to us all as a nation".

=== March ===
On the morning of 2 March 2012, a delegation of former Vita Cortex workers met Tánaiste and Minister for Foreign Affairs and Trade Eamon Gilmore at a hotel in Cork city.

Henry O'Reilly, a grandfather and Vita Cortex worker for more than 40 years, was reported to have been diagnosed with liver, spleen and pancreatic cancer. His cancer diagnosis came after he contracted suspected pneumonia while protesting for better conditions at the freezing Vita Cortex plant.

March also saw the protest reach 100 days. More than 100 family members and friends of the former Vita Cortex workers gathered in the factory canteen and a Mass was celebrated.

=== April ===
The workers blocked the factory gates to stop trucks making deliveries and collections to and from a sister business, Vita Clean, on the same site. They later decided to open the gates after consulting with SIPTU officials.

=== May ===
The 161-day sit-in was ended in May 2012, after the workers started receiving redundancy payments.

The workers were later received by President Michael D. Higgins at Áras an Uachtaráin.

== See also ==
- Post-2008 Irish economic downturn
- List of Irish protests since 2008
