= 2010 student protest in Dublin =

Austerity protest in Dublin, Ireland

2010 student protests in Dublin
- Part of Anti-austerity protests in Ireland
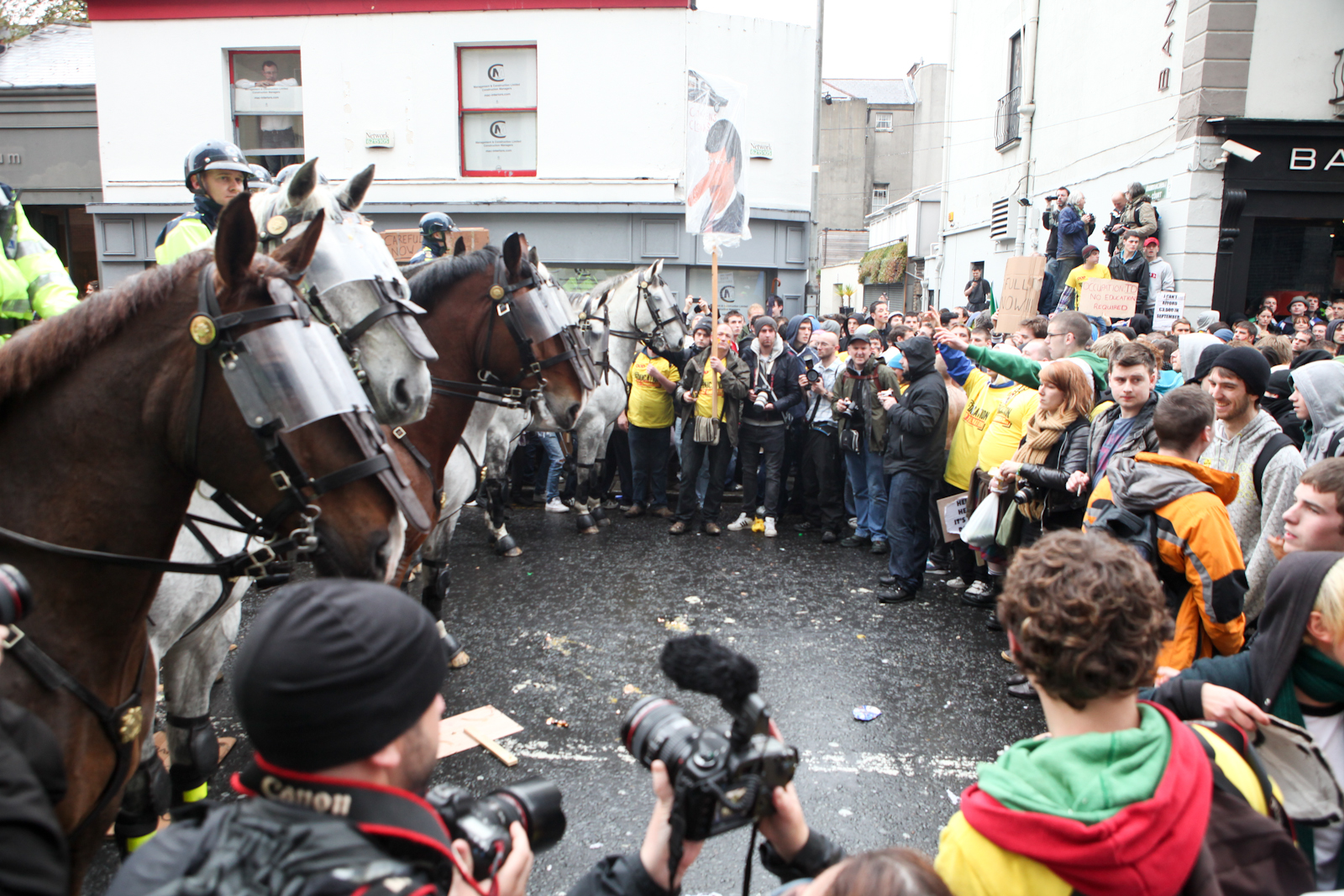
- Mounted members of An Garda Siochana confront student protesters outside the Ministry of Fiance building
- Date: 3 November 2010
- Location: Dublin, Ireland

The 2010 student protest in Dublin was a demonstration that took place in the centre of the city on 4 November 2010 in opposition to a proposed increase in university registration fees, further cuts to the student maintenance grant and increasing graduate unemployment and emigration levels caused by the 28th Government of Ireland.

Poster by the Union of Students in Ireland advertising the march

Organized by the Union of Students in Ireland (USI) and students unions nationwide, it saw between 25,000 and 40,000 protesters on the streets of central Dublin during what The Irish Times described as "the largest student protest for a generation". The protestors came from all over Ireland – students from most third-level colleges featured, as did some protestors from Queen's University Belfast – with many travelling to the city by coach. It took more than an hour and a half for all the protestors to walk from Parnell Square to Government Buildings in Merrion Street, a short distance.

Some protestors and gardaí engaged in clashes following the protest, with an unidentified number of people being wounded and three gardaí sustaining minor injuries; two arrests were made. The two men who were arrested were in their twenties and charged with criminal damage and a breach of the peace respectively. The Department of Finance was occupied by protestors for a time, and 36 complaints of police brutality were made of which just over half were admitted; these led to a further march by students seven days later with the intention to "end garda brutality".

Presseurop wondered the day after thousands of students marched on the streets of Dublin: "Has Ireland awoken?" and said the protest had "Giv[en] the lie to general opinion that the economically stricken nation has taken swingeing austerity measures with passive resignation". Similar events occurred across Europe with the 2010 student protest in London happening one week later.

== Background ==
The BBC's Ireland Correspondent Mark Simpson noted that most demonstrations in Ireland had been "angry rather than violent". One example he alluded to occurred two days before students demonstrated when Minister for Health and Children Mary Harney was successfully pelted with red paint by an opposition politician in a protest intended to highlight the "blood budget" which "will result in the unnecessary and avoidable deaths of hundreds, if not thousands, of people over the coming years"; this incident occurred while she was attempting to open a mental healthcare facility in Dublin. But Simpson also wrote that "It is unlikely that their [students] demonstration will make any difference. [...] They [the Irish government] will be hoping that young people will eventually accept [that Ireland has no money]. After all, most students know what it feels like to be broke".

== March and further events ==
According to The Irish Times, the protest was "powerful, uplifting – and very peaceful". It commenced from Parnell Square at 13:00. T-shirts bearing slogans such as "Education not Emigration" were worn by many protestors. Students from Queen's University Belfast joined their counterparts on the streets of Dublin for the protest in return for support given to their own protest at Stormont two days earlier. Forty minutes later, some protestors left the march route at Nassau Street and approached Dáil Éireann's front gates on Kildare Street. Some scaled poles and items were thrown through the gates. March organisers sent them back to the main protest.

Several dozen protestors entered the Department of Finance's lobby at 15:00 and commenced occupation. Authorities removed some and barricaded the remainder inside. More students gathered outside the entrance where authorities lined up to separate them from those inside the building, while horses and vans were deployed to split those outside into two. A sit-down protest ensued among those who were outside. Riot police arrived on the scene and authorities removed the rest of the protestors still inside the building, some of whom had "evidence of a beating on their faces" (The Irish Times). Riot police then forced those outside to move backwards, eventually charging at them followed by horses and dogs until they reached the Shelbourne Hotel. A second charge by the authorities forced those in the vicinity back to Anglo Irish Bank.

Many of those left outside the Department of Finance then joined a peaceful sit-down protest which was occurring outside Dáil Éireann. Free Education for Everyone then organised a march to Pearse Street garda station, thought to be the destination of those who had been arrested. They collected there and demanded the release of anyone who had been arrested.

== Complaints of police brutality ==
Two female protesters were reported to have been pulled out of the Department of Finance "by their ankles" and one by her hair. One bespectacled male student was trampled upon by a horse. A female was kicked and knocked to the ground by a horse. Another who said she was engaging in a peaceful protest was told by police to "get the fuck off the street" before being batoned. A male sitting peacefully on the ground with his hands out was reported to have been "rammed" by four garda horses. Blood and facial injuries were a common sight.

After viewing video footage of the disorder MEP Joe Higgins said: "The use of Garda horses and dogs against student protesters in Dublin on Wednesday is an outrageous abuse of the right to protest. The intention was clearly to intimidate peaceful protesters and it is an utter scandal. They should never again be used against protesters".

These events led to numerous complaints about police brutality being sent to the Garda Síochána Ombudsman Commission (GSOC). Within days the number of complaints had more than doubled. Video footage taken by witnesses was to be examined.

On 10 November, hundreds of students marched through Dublin again, this time before the banner "END GARDA BRUTALITY". The Irish Times stated that "While members of the Socialist Worker Student Society and the 32 County Sovereignty Movement were present at last night's protest, they made up only a small proportion of the crowd". Among the protestors was Vanessa O'Sullivan, video footage of whom unconscious was broadcast on YouTube and RTÉ. She told the crowd: "This day last week I was knocked unconscious by a gárda... All I am guilty of is walking inside a public building and sitting down".

== See also ==
- Free education
- March for a Better Way
- Right to education
- Universal access to education
- 2010 United Kingdom student protests
- 2011 England riots
