= Mark Simpson (Ireland correspondent) =

British journalist

- Born: Northern Ireland, United Kingdom
- Occupations: Journalist, writer

Mark Simpson is a journalist who served as BBC's Ireland Correspondent from 2008 to 2013.

== Career ==
Simpson began his journalistic career at a series of Northern Irish newspapers – the News Letter, The Irish News, and the Belfast Telegraph – after graduating in 1988 from Queen's University Belfast with a degree in History and Politics. He joined the BBC in 1998 as a political correspondent. He was nominated as Television News Broadcaster of the Year at the BT UK Regional Press and Broadcast Awards 2000. In 2005 he moved to Leeds, England to the position of North of England Correspondent, where he reported for the national BBC News, including Shannon Matthews' disappearance and later discovery.

In 2008, he then returned to Belfast where he attained the position of Ireland Correspondent, taking over from Denis Murray.

== Personal life ==
He was born in 1968, and is from Helen's Bay, Bangor, County Down. He now lives with his family in Holywood, County Down. He has three daughters.
