= Anti-austerity movement in Ireland =

- Part of the euro area crisis
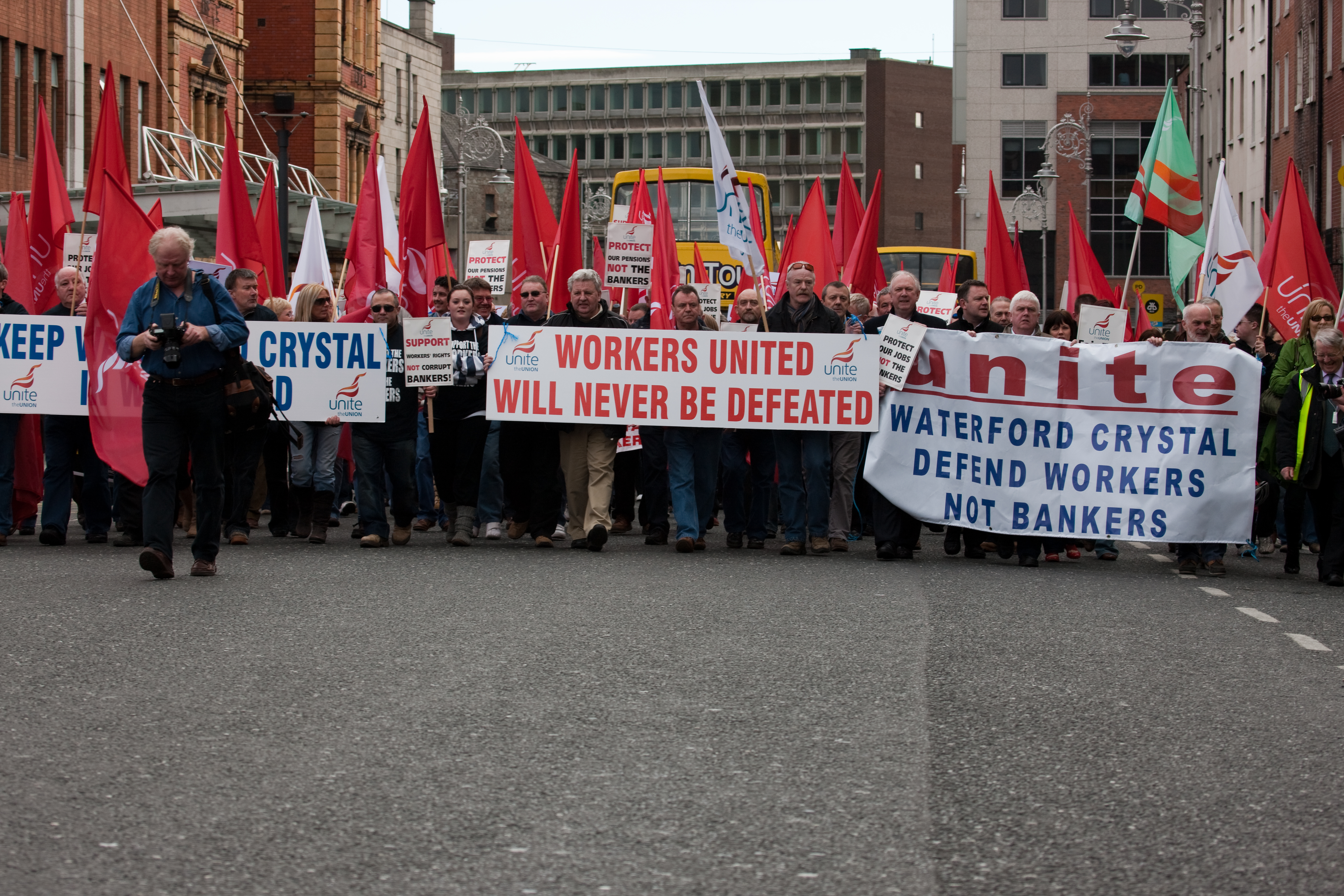
- Workers march through Dublin against the government's response to the financial crisis, 2009
- Date: 22 October 2008 – 23 February 2015
- Location: Ireland
- Caused by: Unemployment, corruption, austerity, social protection, financial crisis, banking crisis, arrival and presence of the IMF in the country, bipartidism, particracy, democracy deficit
- Methods: Demonstrations, occupations, civil disobedience, Internet activism
- Status: Ended

The anti-austerity movement in Ireland saw major demonstrations from 2008 (the year of the Irish economic downturn) to 2015.

The protests began during October 2008 after the Fianna Fáil–Green Party coalition of the 30th Dáil oversaw the implementation of the bank guarantee, and were given further impetus by the late 2010 intervention of the European Union/European Central Bank/International Monetary Fund troika and the collapse of that government early the following year. Protests continued during the Fine Gael–Labour coalition of the 31st Dáil.

== Background ==
The post-2008 Irish economic downturn coincided with a series of banking scandals, followed the 1990s and 2000s Celtic Tiger period of rapid real economic growth fuelled by foreign direct investment, a subsequent property bubble which rendered the real economy uncompetitive, and an expansion in bank lending in the early 2000s. An initial slowdown in economic growth amid the international 2008 financial crisis greatly intensified in late 2008 and the country fell into recession for the first time since the 1980s. Emigration, as did unemployment (particularly in the construction sector), escalated to levels not seen since that decade.

The Irish Stock Exchange (ISEQ) general index, which reached a peak of 10,000 points briefly in April 2007, fell to 1,987 points—a 14-year low—on 24 February 2009 (the last time it was under 2,000 being mid-1995). In September 2008, the Irish government—a Fianna Fáil-Green coalition—officially acknowledged the country's descent into recession; a massive jump in unemployment occurred in the following months. Ireland was the first state in the eurozone to enter recession, as declared by the Central Statistics Office (CSO). By January 2009, the number of people living on unemployment benefits had risen to 326,000—the highest monthly level since records began in 1967—and the unemployment rate rose from 6.5% in July 2008 to 14.8% in July 2012. The slumping economy drew 100,000 demonstrators onto the streets of Dublin on 21 February 2009, amid further talk of protests and industrial action.

With the banks "guaranteed", and the National Asset Management Agency (NAMA) established on the evening of 21 November 2010, then Taoiseach Brian Cowen confirmed on live television that the EU/ECB/IMF troika would be involving itself in Ireland's financial affairs. Support for the Fianna Fáil party, dominant for much of the previous century, then crumbled; in an unprecedented event in the nation's history, it fell to third place in an opinion poll conducted by The Irish Times—placing behind Fine Gael and the Labour Party, the latter rising above Fianna Fáil for the first time. On 22 November, the Greens called for an election the following year. The 2011 general election replaced the ruling coalition another, between Fine Gael and Labour. This coalition continues with the same austerity policies of the previous coalition, as the country's larger parties all favour a similar agenda.

Official statistics showed a drop in most crimes coinciding with the economic downturn. Burglaries, however, rose by approximately 10% and recorded prostitution offences more than doubled from 2009 to 2010. In late 2014 the unemployment rate was 11.0% on the seasonally adjusted measure, still over double the lows of the mid-2000s but down from a peak of 15.1% in early 2012.

The Irish economy started to recover from 2014 onwards.

== 2008 ==
The Irish government officially declared it was in a recession in September 2008. Before this declaration, the government announced, on 3 September 2008, that it would bring forward the 2009 government budget from its usual December date to 14 October 2008. In a statement, the government claimed that this was largely due to a decrease in the global economy. The budget, labelled "the toughest in many years", included a number of controversial measures such as a proposed income levy which was eventually restructured, and the withdrawal of previously promised HPV vaccines for schoolgirls. Other results of the budget included a new income levy being imposed on all workers above a specified threshold and the closure of a number of military barracks near the border with Northern Ireland.

An unexpected public outcry was invoked over the proposed withdrawal of medical cards and the threatened return of university fees. A series of demonstrations ensued amongst teachers and farmers, whilst on 22 October 2008, at least 25,000 pensioners and students descended in solidarity on the Irish parliament at Leinster House, Kildare Street, Dublin. Some of the pensioners cheered on the students as the protests passed each other on the streets of Dublin. Changes to education led to a ministerial meeting with three Church of Ireland bishops who were assured by O'Keeffe that religious instruction would be unaffected by the budget changes.

Rebellion within the ranks of the ruling coalition government led to a number of defections of disenchanted coalition members. County Wicklow TD Joe Behan resigned from Fianna Fáil in protests at the proposed medical card changes after suggesting that past taoisigh Éamon de Valera and Seán Lemass "would be turning in their graves at the decisions made in the past week". Independent Deputy Finian McGrath then threatened to withdraw his support for the government unless the plan to remove the over-70s automatic right to a medical card was withdrawn completely. Taoiseach Brian Cowen postponed a planned trip to China, sending Minister for Education and Science Batt O'Keeffe ahead to lead the delegation. Behan, alongside McGrath and former government minister Jim McDaid, later voted against his former colleagues in two crucial Dáil votes on medical cards and cancer vaccines. These defections reduced the Irish government's majority of twelve by one quarter.

== 2009 ==
Thousands of students marched down O'Connell Street (pictured above on a quieter day in 2008) in protest against the reintroduction of university fees after the fallout of the 2009 emergency budget

On 18 February 2009, 13,000 civil servants voted for industrial action over a proposed pension levy. They effected this action on 26 February.

Days earlier, as many as 120,000 people, had protested on the streets of Dublin on 21 February. This was followed by a further march through the capital by gardaí on 25 February and a lunch-time protest by 10,000 civil servants on 19 March 2009. This was followed by two separate taxi drivers' protests in Dublin on 20 March 2009.

== 2010 ==
A student demonstration took place in Dublin on 3 November 2010 in opposition to a proposed increase in university registration fees, further cuts to the student maintenance grant and increasing graduate unemployment and emigration levels caused by the Fianna Fáil led 28th Government of Ireland. Organized by the Union of Students in Ireland (USI) and students unions nationwide, it saw between 25,000 and 40,000 protesters on the streets of central Dublin during what The Irish Times described as "the largest student protest for a generation". There were some clashes between protesters and police after Several dozen protestors entered the Department of Finance's lobby and commenced occupation.

Complaints of police brutality led to another protest on 10 November in Dublin against the behaviour of the Garda Síochána.

The March for a Better Way on 27 November organised by the Irish Congress of Trade Unions was one of the largest protests ever to take place in the country, with organisers estimating around 100,000 in attendance.

A small-scale protest took part outside Leinster House on Kildare Street on the day the Fianna Fáil-led Government announced the budget for the upcoming year. One man was arrested after parking a cherry picker at the front gates of Leinster House.

== 2011 ==
For the early part of 2011 no major protests took place due to the onset of the Irish general election, which saw the formation of a Fine Gael and Labour Party coalition government.

=== Occupy movement ===
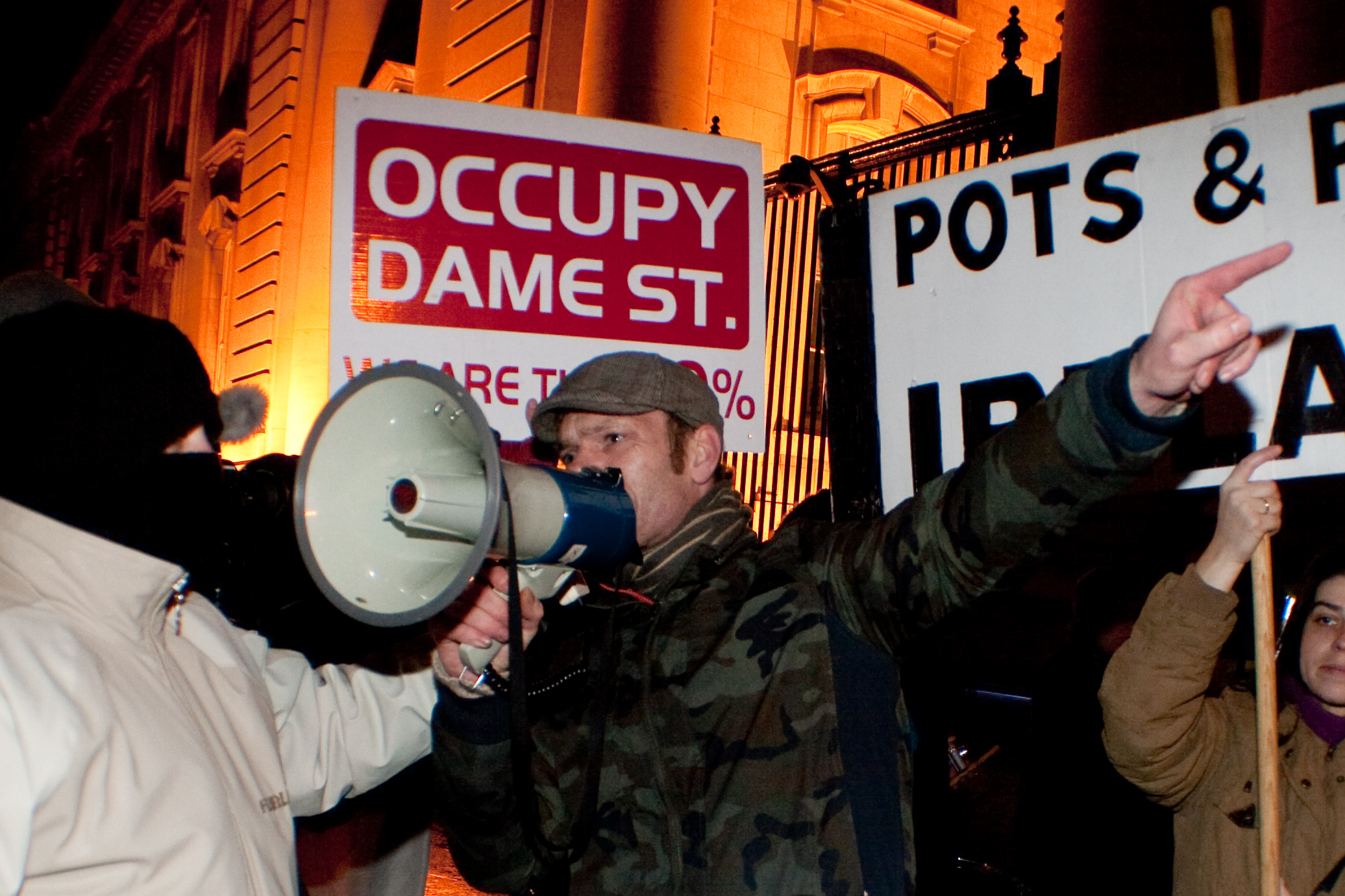
Occupy Dame Street protesting outside Dáil Éireann on Budget Day, 6 December 2011

In October 2011 Occupy camps were established in Dublin, Cork, Waterford and Galway. A number of protests organised by the Occupy movement attracted over 2,000 in Dublin and 400 in Cork. There were two separate demonstrations in Dublin on 15 October.

=== Student actions ===
As the year went on students became increasingly concerned about the honesty and integrity of the pledge signed by Ruairi Quinn before the election that the Labour Party would oppose increased tuition fees.

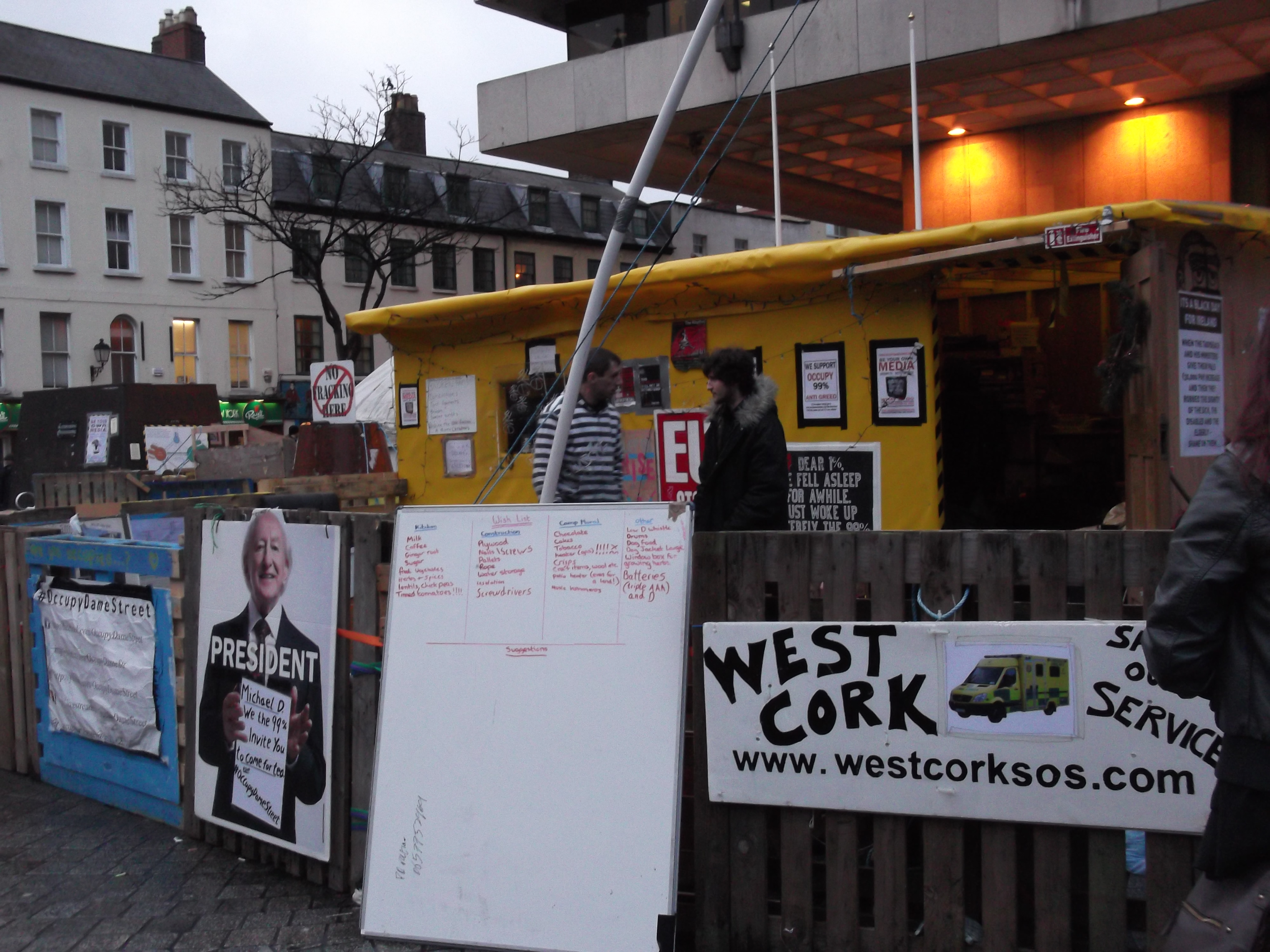
Tent Town on Dame Street

On 16 November 2011, thousands of students, their parents and families marched on Government Buildings amid concerns about the reintroduction of third-level fees. A small group also engaged in a sit-down protest outside the Fine Gael office on Dublin's Upper Mount Street.

At around 4 pm on 29 November 2011, three student union presidents (of Galway-Mayo Institute of Technology, University College Cork and IT Carlow) under the leadership of Union of Students in Ireland (USI) President Gary Redmond occupied a room at Department of Social Protection on Dublin's Store Street as part of a continued effort to have the Labour Party clarify its position on tuition fees. Police broke down the door of the room in which they were stationed and led them away. The students came armed with a chemical toilet and supplies of food that could have lasted them weeks. Ten student union presidents also attempted to occupy a room at the Department of Enterprise on Kildare Street for the same reasons.

Nine FEE students, also seeking clarification on the government's view on third-level fees, participated in a peaceful sit-down protest by occupying the constituency office of Fine Gael TD and former mayor Brian Walsh in Bohermore, Galway, around midday on 30 November 2011. They unfurled a banner on the roof with the message, "FREE EDUCATION NOTHING LESS". They were arrested by the police and released a short time later.

On 2 December 2011, eight students from the National University of Ireland, Maynooth (NUIM), including the university's student union president Rob Munnelly, began occupying the Naas constituency office of Fine Gael TD Anthony Lawlor. They did so with sleeping bags, clothes, a chemical toilet and a week's supply of food and were supported by other students on Facebook and Twitter. During the occupation Munnelly debated with Lawlor live on Kildare TV, USI President Gary Redmond visited the revolting students and a banner with the slogan "SAVE THE GRANT" was erected at Lawlor's entrance.

== 2012 ==
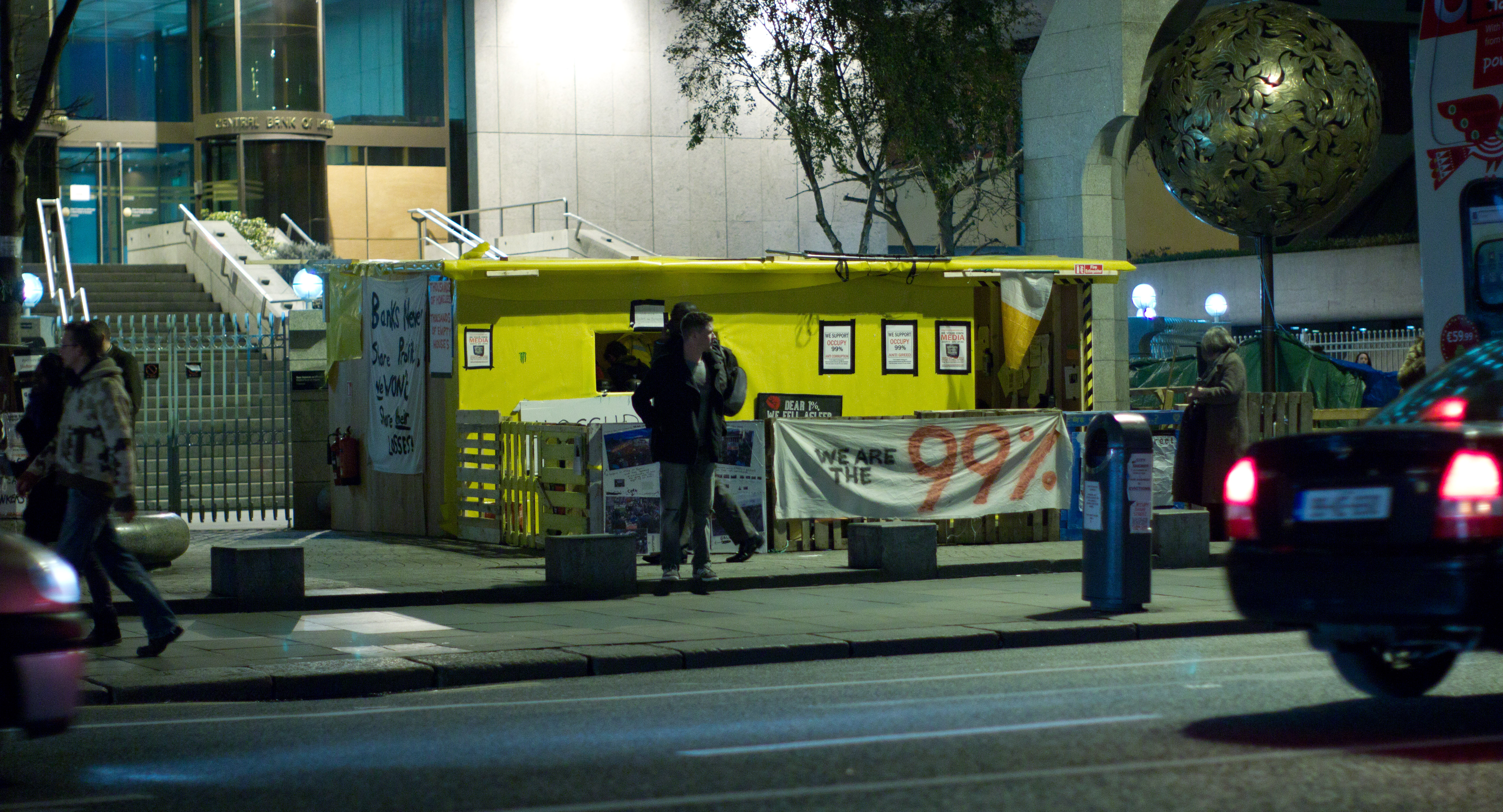
The Occupy Dame Street camp in Dublin

Occupy camps continued into 2012. Occupy Cork occupied the NAMA owned Stapleton House on Oliver Plunkett Street. Authorities requested the protesters to postpone the Occupy Dame Street camp for the Saint Patrick's Day Parade on 17 March. Occupy Dame Street's camp was dismantled by Gardaí in the early hours of 8 March during which time some 15 protesters affiliated with the group were present. Protesters announced a demonstration at the Central Bank for later that day and vowed that the destruction of their camp does not mean their quest for justice is over. on the evening of 8 March over 70 people took part in a spontaneous march from Dame Street to a nearby Garda station on Pearse Street in protest of the removal of the camp. By June 2012 all camps in the Republic of Ireland had been dismantled. 7 Members of Occupy Dame Street staged a demonstration in a Bank of Ireland branch in Dublin on 23 July, forcing it to temporarily close.

The first large scale protest in 2012 took place at the Ardfheis of Fine Gael on 30 March in Dublin, organisers estimated around 10,000 in attendance.

A second demonstration took place at the Party conference of the Labour Party at the Bailey Allen Hall at NUI Galway on 14 April in Galway with around 4,000 in attendance. A number of protesters broke past police barriers leading to scuffles between protesters and police. Police used pepper spray to hold back demonstrators. MEP Emer Costello described protesters as "Bully boys" and said "None of those people (referring to protesters) are actually democrats".

A rally organised by the 'Campaign against the Household and Water Taxes' filled the 2,000 capacity National Stadium in Dublin with thousands more having to stand in the surrounding streets. 'Campaign against the Household and Water Taxes' also staged a minor protest in Dublin in July 2012 while 500 protesters against proposed Septic Tank charges had a demonstration outside Leinster House.

On 5 October in Ballyfermot, the car of Tánaiste Eamon Gilmore was involved in an altercation with a small number of protesters; one man was arrested.

On 9 October, around 20,000 farmers marched in Dublin over concerns about future funding.

On 10 November, thousands of people marched against, amongst other issues, threats to their hospital in Waterford, the largest such event in the city for decades. Gillian Savage Corcoran and Andrea Galgey, who described themselves as "just concerned citizens", initiated the rally.

On 24 November 2012, thousands of people marched against austerity in Dublin, amid calls for a general strike to shut the country down. (Photos of protest.)

On 8 December 2012, TD Thomas Pringle addressed crowds of protesters against the property tax at a post-budget rally in Letterkenny.

== 2013 ==
In late January, the Ballyhea protesters who have been going since 2011, achieved their 100th protest.

On 28 January 2013, protesters against the household tax occupied the public gallery and Cork City Council abandoned a meeting. A similar protest had occurred the previous October but that meeting resumed after Gardaí were deployed to remove the protesters.

On 9 February 2013, more than 110,000 people marched against the bank debt burden in nationwide demonstrations in Dublin, Cork, Galway, Limerick, Waterford and Sligo. Then on 11 February 2013, protesters against the household tax demonstrated at meetings of South Dublin County Council in Tallaght and Fingal County Council in Swords.

On 13 April 2013, people marched to Dublin Castle where EU leaders were meeting during Ireland's EU presidency. Banners indicated people had come from across the country to register their protest against home and water taxes while, in the week of Margaret Thatcher's death, posters exclaimed "Bury this Thatcherite tax" and others called for a general strike. Anti-austerity politicians, including TDs Richard Boyd Barrett, Joe Higgins and Joan Collins, addressed the crowd. RTÉ's coverage of events was roundly criticised by commentators.

On 1 May, gardaí arrested five members of the Campaign Against Home and Water Taxes, including Cork City Councillors Ted Tynan and Mick Barry, during a midday protest inside the Patrick Street branch of the Bank of Ireland in the city. People gathered on the street.

== 2014 ==
In March 2014, people protested against austerity at an awards ceremony honouring President of the European Commission José Manuel Barroso in Cork. Also that month the Broadcasting Authority of Ireland (BAI) rejected seven complaints against RTÉ's Six One News focusing on news anchor Bryan Dobson's on-air insult of people demonstrating against austerity as "idiots".

On 12 November, anti-water tax protesters heckled at Dublin's General Post Office as the Taoiseach unveiled the government's planned Easter Rising centenary commemorations. On 15 November, anti-water tax protesters including the recently elected Anti-Austerity Alliance TD Paul Murphy, forcibly prevented the car of the Tánaiste, Joan Burton, from leaving an event in Jobstown. As she was escorted away by Gardaí a water balloon struck her shoulder. A video from the same weekend of one young lady being flung violently against a bollard by Gardaí emerged later and went viral, provoking public outrage and commentary.

On 17 November, anti-water tax protesters in Sligo blocked the Taoiseach's car and scuffles broke out.

Right2Water emerged in late 2014. They would hold regular demonstrations nationwide in the years ahead (details of which are here). On 10 December, as Right2Water gathered outside the Dáil, an unofficial group broke away and occupied the main junction of the city, O'Connell bridge. Traffic was brought to a standstill as protesters used barricades and sat on the roads to block traffic. After several hours the crowd of 1,000 had dwindled to an estimated 200. Scuffles broke out as Gardaí removed people by force to clear the thoroughfare and three men and a woman were arrested on public order offences.

Civil disobedience was widespread across the nation as the year drew to a close, with residents in many areas preventing workmen from installing water meters on their properties.

== 2015 ==
On 26 January, President Michael D. Higgins's car was surrounded by demonstrators against the water charges. The incident followed on from Higgins's signing into law of the Water Services Bill without referring it to the Council of State. The protest, politicisation of the office of the President and the personal abuse shouted at the President were widely criticised.

On 12 February, people demonstrated outside the Department of Justice following the arrests of some anti-austerity activists (including that of Paul Murphy, TD), in relation to the Jobstown protest of the previous November.

On 19 February, there was a demonstration in Dublin after five people opposed to water charges were sent to Mountjoy Prison for contempt of court, after they had breached orders about interfering with the installation of water meters.

On 21 February, thousands of people marched through Dublin from the Central Bank to Mountjoy Prison in opposition to the jailing of five protesters and the continuing arrests of activists. The crowd were told that three of the five had initiated a hunger strike after being moved from Mountjoy to Wheatfield Prison. They hunger strike was abandoned two days later, on 23 February.

Also on 21 February, people associated with the groups Forgotten Farmers, Right2Water, People Before Profit and the National Reform Movement gathered outside Fine Gael's National Conference in Castlebar.

On 23 February, a group occupied the main council chamber for more than half an hour and disrupted a meeting of Cork City Council. There to watch the debate on a motion condemning the jailing of the five activists, their protest meant the vote was not held as the meeting was abandoned.

== See also ==
- List of protests in the 21st century
