= Post-2008 Irish economic downturn =

Economic downturn in Ireland

Irish government deficit compared to other European countries and the United States (2000–2013)

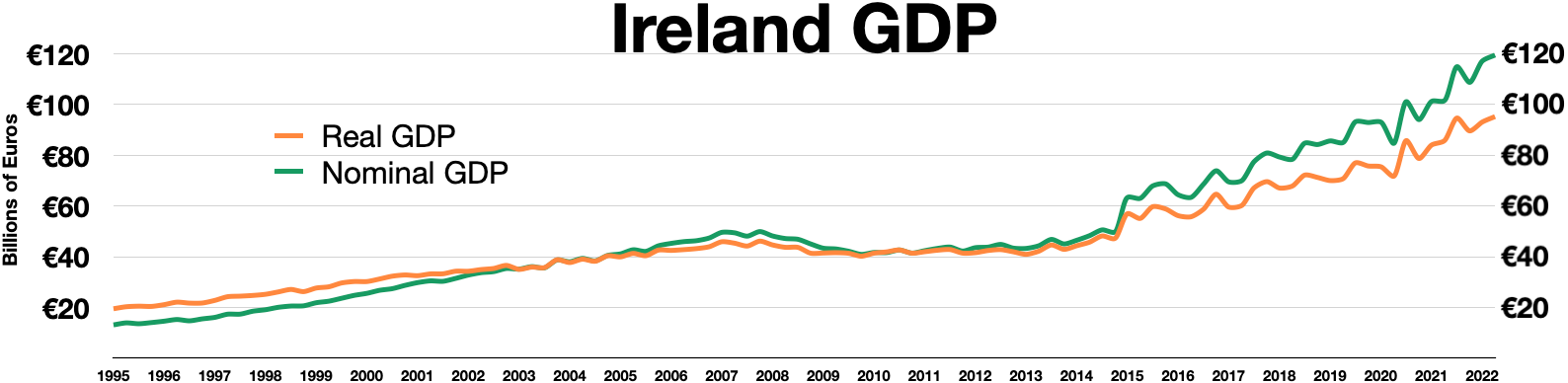
Ireland GDP Real GDP (chained 2010 Euros) Nominal GDP

The post-2008 Irish economic downturn in the Republic of Ireland, coincided with a series of banking scandals, followed the 1990s and 2000s Celtic Tiger period of rapid real economic growth fuelled by foreign direct investment, a subsequent property bubble which rendered the real economy uncompetitive, and an expansion in bank lending in the early 2000s. An initial slowdown in economic growth during the 2008 financial crisis greatly intensified in late 2008 and the country fell into recession for the first time since the 1980s. Emigration, as well as unemployment (particularly in the construction sector), escalated to levels not seen since that decade.

The Irish Stock Exchange (ISEQ) general index, which reached a peak of 10,000 points briefly in April 2007, fell to 1,987 points—a 14-year low—on 24 February 2009 (the last time it was under 2,000 being mid-1995). In September 2008, the Irish government—a Fianna Fáil–Green coalition—officially acknowledged the country's descent into recession; a massive jump in unemployment occurred in the following months. Ireland was the first state in the eurozone to enter recession, as declared by the Central Statistics Office (CSO). By January 2009, the number of people living on unemployment benefits had risen to 326,000—the highest monthly level since records began in 1967—and the unemployment rate rose from 6.5% in July 2008 to 14.8% in July 2012. The slumping economy drew 100,000 demonstrators onto the streets of Dublin on 21 February 2009, amid further talk of protests and industrial action.

With the banks "guaranteed", and the National Asset Management Agency (NAMA) established on the evening of 21 November 2010, then Taoiseach Brian Cowen confirmed on live television that the EU/ECB/IMF troika would be involving itself in Ireland's financial affairs. Support for the Fianna Fáil party, dominant for much of the previous century, then crumbled; in an unprecedented event in the nation's history, it fell to third place in an opinion poll conducted by The Irish Times—placing behind Fine Gael and the Labour Party, the latter rising above Fianna Fáil for the first time. On 22 November, the Greens called for an election the following year. The 2011 general election replaced the ruling coalition with another between Fine Gael and Labour. This coalition continued with the same austerity policies of the previous coalition, as the country's larger parties all favour a similar agenda, but subsequently lost power in the 2016 General Election.

Official statistics showed a drop in most crimes coinciding with the economic downturn. Burglaries, however, rose by approximately 10% and recorded prostitution offences more than doubled from 2009 to 2010. In late 2014 the unemployment rate was 11.0% on the seasonally adjusted measure, still over double the lows of the mid-2000s but down from a peak of 15.1% in early 2012. By May 2016, this figure had fallen to 7.8%, and had returned to a pre-downturn level of 4.5% by June 2019.

== Background and causes ==
The economy of the Republic of Ireland expanded rapidly during the Celtic Tiger years (1995–2007) due to a low corporate tax rate, low ECB interest rates, and other systemic factors (such as soft surveillance of banking supervision including against observance of Basel Core Principles, underdeveloped public financial management and anti-corruption systems and adoption of poor policies including a corporate tax system that fostered non-tradable goods and services through the construction industry). At the end of the third quarter of 2010, German banks had between US$186.4 billion and $208.3 billion in total exposure to Ireland with $57.8 billion in exposure to Irish banks. This led to an expansion of credit and a property bubble which petered out in 2007. Irish banks, already over-exposed to the Irish property market, came under severe pressure in September 2008 due to the 2008 financial crisis.

The foreign borrowings of Irish banks rose from €15 billion to €110 billion in 2004–08. Much of this was borrowed on a three-month rollover basis to fund building projects that would not be sold for several years. When the properties could not be sold due to oversupply, the result was a classic asset–liability mismatch. At the time of the bank guarantee the banks were said to be illiquid (but not insolvent) by €4 billion; this turned out to be an enormous underestimate.

== Impact ==
The economy and government finances began to show signs of impending recession by the end of 2007 when tax revenues fell short of the 2007 annual budget forecast by €2.3 billion (5%), with stamp duties and income tax both falling short by €0.8 billion (19% and 5%) resulting in the 2007 general government budget surplus of €2.3 billion (1.2% of GDP) being wiped out. An imminent recession became clear by mid-2008. Subsequently, government deficits increased, many businesses closed and unemployment increased. The Irish Stock Exchange (ISEQ) fell and many immigrant workers left.

=== Anglo Irish Bank ===
Anglo Irish Bank was exposed to the Irish property bubble. A hidden loans controversy in December 2008 led to a further drop in its share price. The ISEQ dropped to a 14-year low on 24 September 2009, probably triggered by the unexpected resignation of former Anglo Irish Bank director Anne Heraty from the board of the Irish Stock Exchange the night before.

=== Property market ===
Due to the ending of the bubble, the residential and commercial property markets went into a severe slump with both sales and property values collapsing.

Developers such as Liam Carroll began to fall behind on their loan repayments. Due to the 2008 financial crisis, banks such as ACC pushed for their revenue recovery and requested liquidation of the development firms.

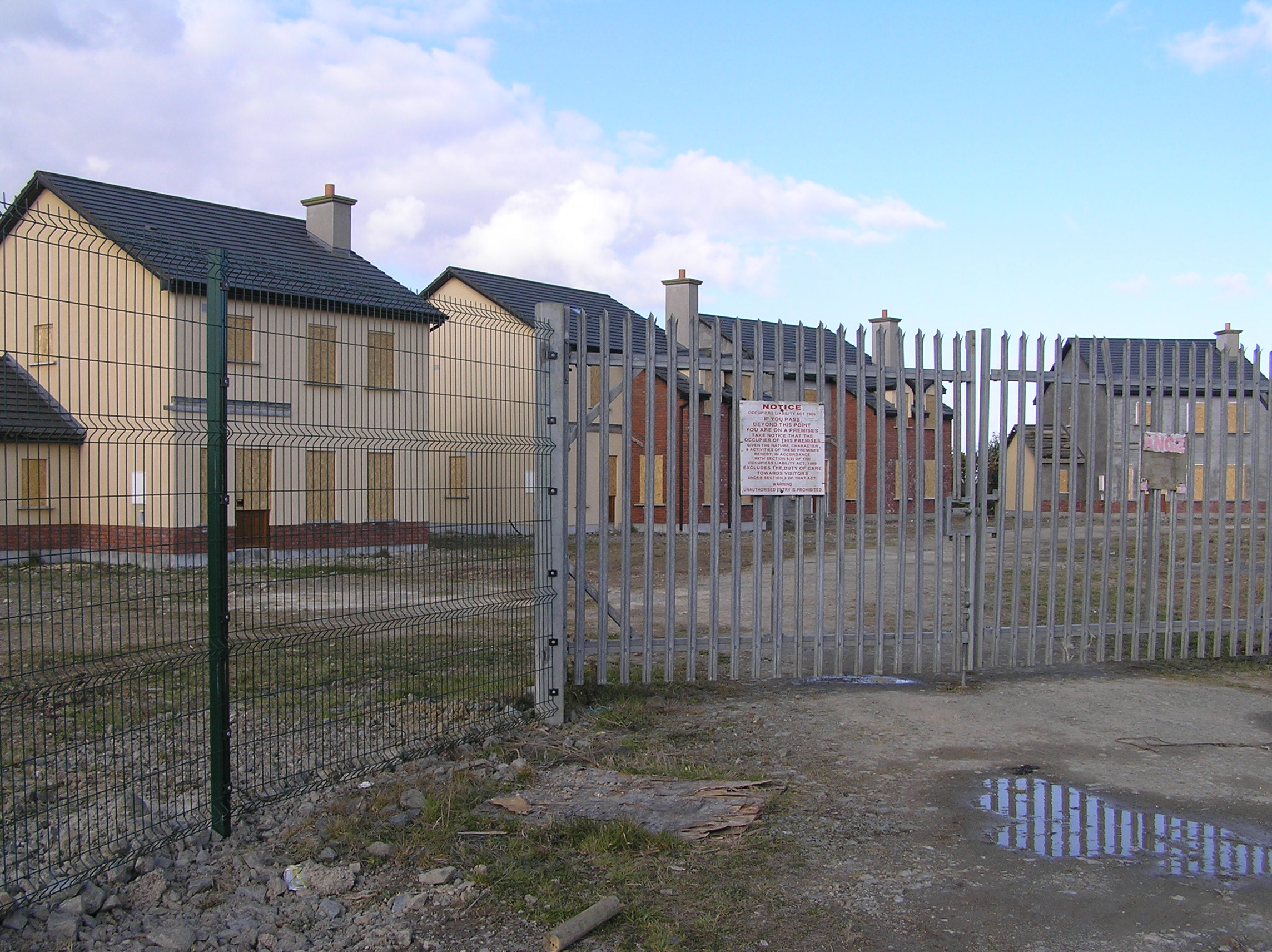
A 'ghost estate' in Ireland

=== Economy ===
The Irish economy entered severe recession in 2008, and then entered into an economic depression in 2009. The Economic and Social Research Institute predicted an economic contraction of 14% by 2010. In the first quarter in 2009, GDP was down 8.5% from the same quarter the previous year, and GNP down 12%. Unemployment rose from 8.75% to 11.4%. The economy exited recession in the third quarter of 2009, with GDP growing by 0.3% in the quarter, but GNP continued to contract, by 1.4%. The economy grew by 1.9% in Q1 and by 1.6% in Q2 of 2011 but contracted by 1.9% in Q3.

=== Unemployment ===
The unemployment rate rose from 4.2% in 2007 to reach 14.6% in February 2012.

=== Emigration ===
The Central Statistics Office estimated that 34,500 people left the country from April 2009 to 2010, the largest net emigration since 1989. However, only 27,700 of these are Irish nationals, an increase of 12,400 since 2006. It's also notable that more people went somewhere other than the UK, EU or US, traditional destinations for Irish emigrants.

== Downturn ==
=== 2008: Cowen government ===
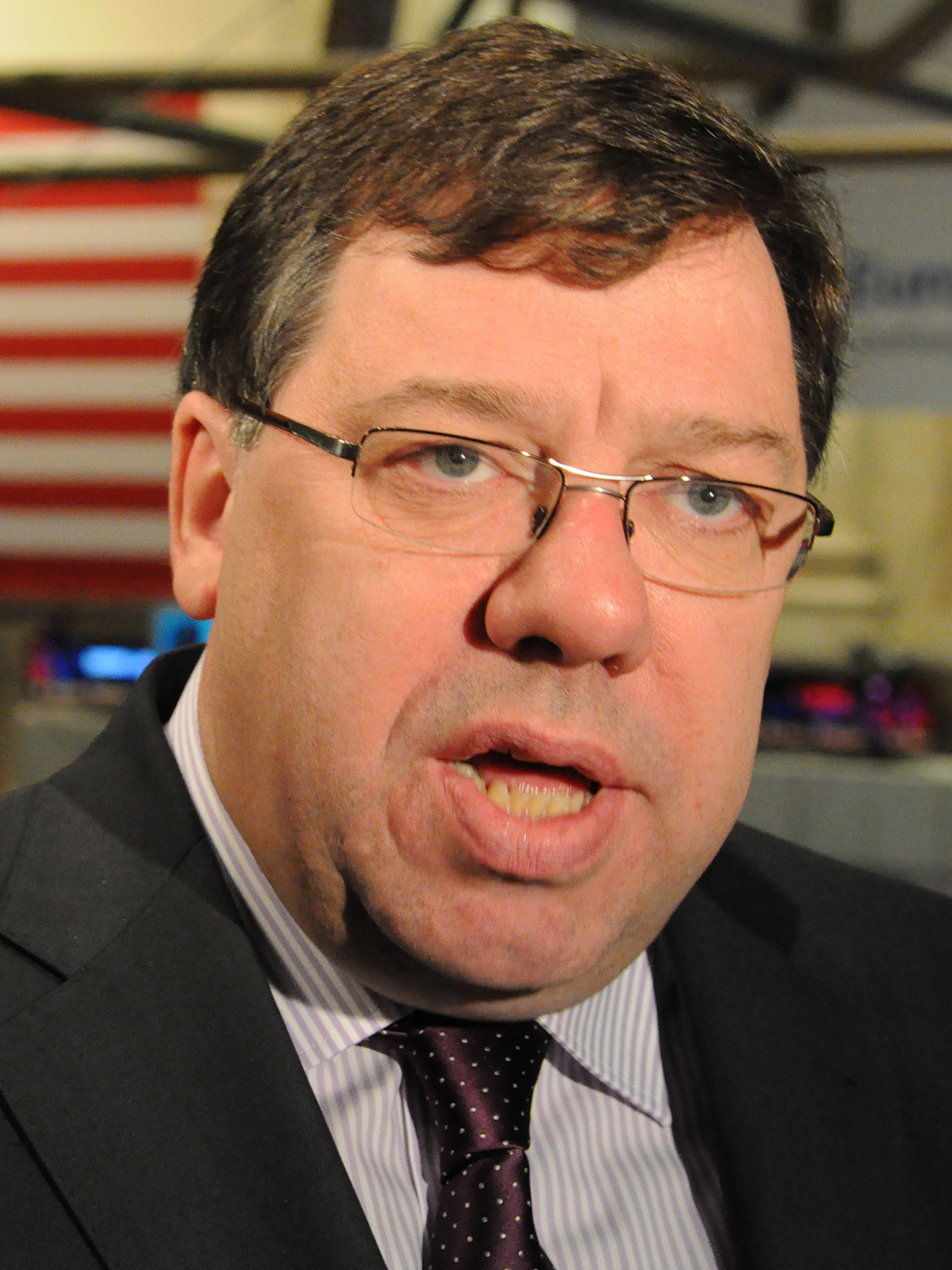
Brian Cowen

Following the May 2008 appointment of Brian Cowen as Taoiseach, the ruling Fianna Fáil party had been polling close to their 41% levels of the 2007 election but the party began to fall in the polls from September 2008. Their support fell to third place for the first time ever behind both leading opposition parties in a national opinion poll published in The Irish Times on 13 February 2009, polling only 22%. A 27 February poll, indicated that only 10% of voters were satisfied with the Government's performance, that over 50% would like an immediate general election. They gained about 24% of the vote in the June 2009 local elections and continued to languish as the crisis intensified during the remainder of the year, reaching a new low of 17% support in September 2009. During the 2009/2010 period opposition calls for an early election intensified and some of their own TDs resigned from the party supporting the calls and reducing the Government majority to single digits. The Government was urged by the courts to hold a long-delayed Donegal South by-election. By December 2010, following the IMF intervention, their support reached a further record low of 13% and their coalition partners, the Green Party, announced that they would withdraw support from Government in January 2011 once the 2011 budget had been passed. The Government announced that an election would take place in Spring 2011 but the intended date had to be brought forward to 25 February 2011 following a widely criticised cabinet reshuffle. Taoiseach Cowen was replaced as party leader by Micheál Martin. At the election, Fianna Fáil received 17% of the vote and their seats collapsed from 71 outgoing to a record low of 20. The Fine Gael and Labour opposition secured record seat gains but no overall majority and formed a coalition government.

==== Government emergency budget of October 2008 ====
Ireland officially declared it was in a recession in September 2008. Before this declaration, the Irish government announced, on 3 September 2008, that it would bring forward the 2009 government budget from its usual December date to 14 October 2008. In a statement, the government claimed that this was largely due to a decrease in the global economy. The budget, labelled "the toughest in many years", included a number of controversial measures such as a proposed income levy which was eventually restructured, and the withdrawal of previously promised HPV vaccines for schoolgirls. Other results of the budget included a new income levy being imposed on all workers above a specified threshold and the closure of a number of military barracks near the border with Northern Ireland.

An unexpected public outcry was invoked over the proposed withdrawal of medical cards and the threatened return of university fees. A series of demonstrations ensued amongst teachers and farmers, whilst on 22 October 2008, at least 25,000 pensioners and students descended in solidarity on the Irish parliament at Leinster House, Kildare Street, Dublin. Some of the pensioners were even seen to cheer on the students as the protests passed each other on the streets of Dublin. Changes to education led to a ministerial meeting with three Church of Ireland bishops who were assured by O'Keeffe that religious instruction would be unaffected by the budget changes.

Rebellion within the ranks of the ruling coalition government led to a number of defections of disenchanted coalition members. County Wicklow TD, Joe Behan resigned from the Fianna Fáil party in protests at the proposed medical card changes after suggesting that past taoisigh Éamon de Valera and Seán Lemass "would be turning in their graves at the decisions made in the past week". Independent TD Finian McGrath then threatened to withdraw his support for the government unless the plan to remove the overs 70s automatic right to a medical card was withdrawn completely. Taoiseach Brian Cowen postponed a planned trip to China, sending Minister for Education and Science Batt O'Keeffe ahead to lead the delegation. Behan, alongside McGrath and former government minister Jim McDaid, later voted against his former colleagues in two crucial Dáil votes on medical cards and cancer vaccines. These defections reduced the Irish government's majority of twelve by one quarter.

A supplementary budget was delivered in April 2009 to address a fiscal shortfall of over €4.5 billion.

==== Bank guarantee ====
On 29 September 2008 the government issued a 2-year unlimited guarantee of all debt (the Credit Institutions Financial Stabilisation Act, or CIFS guarantee) in favour of 6 banks. The comprehensive and unlimited scope of the Irish fait accompli surprised other governments, the ECB and the European Commission at the time. There was an immediate response in the markets, with short term money market funds returning to Ireland, mainly from the UK.

Lorenzo Bini Smaghi, member of the ECB Executive Board, later said, "The ECB learned about the issue and we found it was very surprising that a country comes out by itself – even in a situation in which the Irish were in, with a large banking system – to guarantee everything. It was surprising… It was surprising that someone would embark on blanket guarantee by itself. It was a dangerous gamble."

The CIFS "blanket guarantee" of Irish domestic banks covered debts estimated at €440 billion at the start. It covered all debts of the 6 banks protected, was non-renewable, and was never called on. As such, the guarantee itself did not directly cost the State anything—and since the protected banks paid levies in exchange, it can technically be described as having made money. However, preventing the guarantee from being called on committed the Irish government to preventing the collapse of any of the participating banks, which would have resulted in the calling on of the guarantee at a time when the banks had large debts, bank assets were of little value for lack of buyers, and the government's finances were already under heavy strain.

The CIFS blanket guarantee was never renewed. An ancillary guarantee, the Eligible Liabilities Guarantee, was passed in 2009. This second guarantee scheme applied only to specified new debt (but applied to that debt until maturity), and was renewable on a six-monthly basis. It is this second guarantee that was renewed several times after the expiry of the CIFS guarantee.

==== Comment by the American embassy ====
Despite the bank guarantee in September, by December 2008 the American ambassador was reporting to Washington that no clear plan was in place, after an interview with John McCarthy of the Irish Department of Finance and two other officials. McCarthy was quoted as saying that "forecasting anything in the current uncertain environment is almost impossible" and that the government could "only react given the fast pace of the downturn". The interview was published in 2011 as a part of the United States diplomatic cables leak.

=== 2009: NAMA, strikes and industrial unrest ===
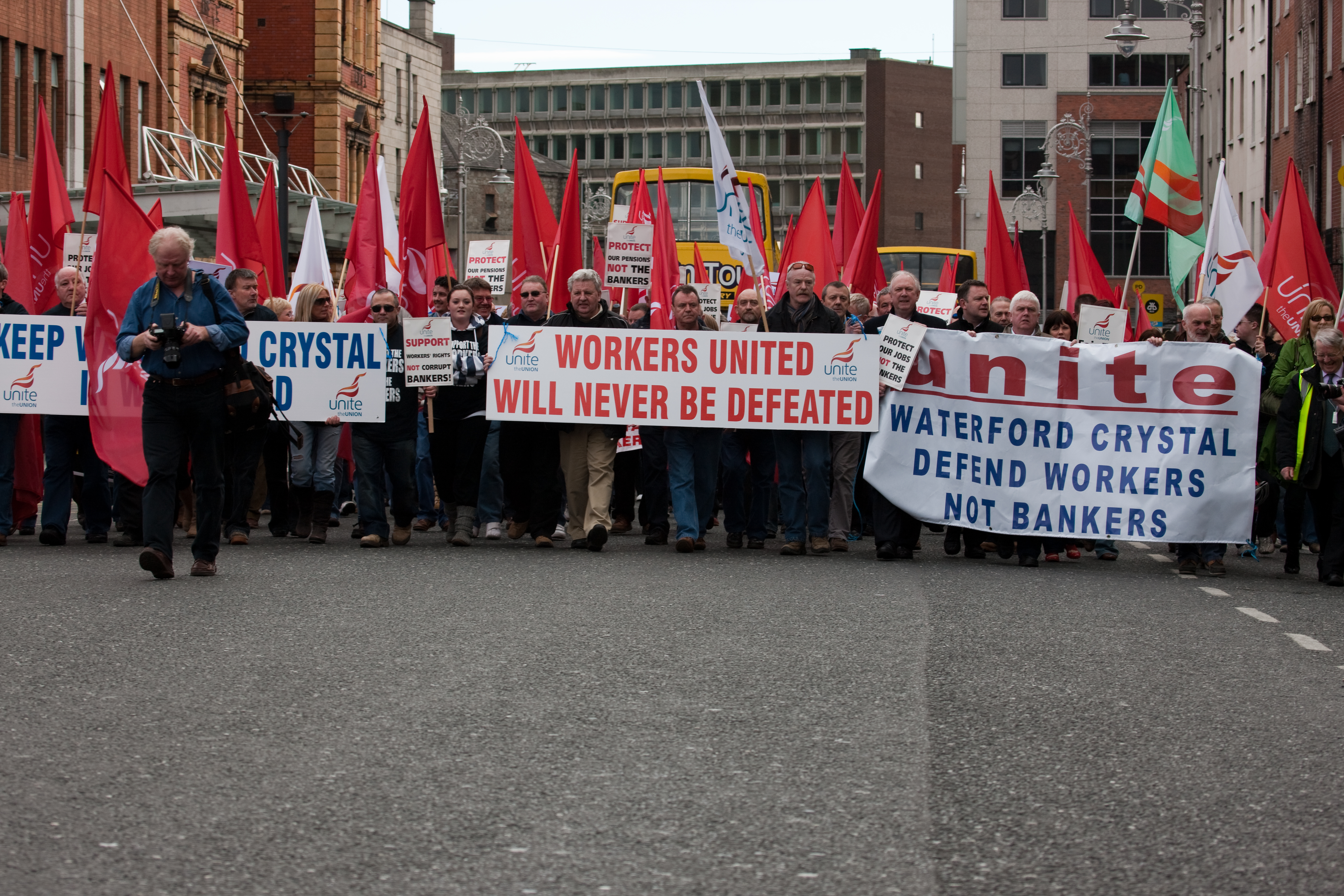
Workers march through Dublin against the government's response to the 2008 financial crisis, 2009

==== Sit-ins and strikes ====
On 5 January 2009, Waterford Wedgwood entered receivership. On 30 January, workers at the Waterford Crystal plant in Kilbarry were told they would be losing their jobs. A statement issued by the receiver, Deloitte's David Carson, confirmed that, of the 670 employees, 480 of them would be laid off. The workers responded angrily to this unexpected decision and at least 100 of them began an unofficial sit-in in the visitors' gallery at the factory that night. They insisted they would refuse to leave until they had met with Carson. Following the revelations, there was a minor scuffle during which the main door to the visitors' centre was damaged. Local Sinn Féin Councillor Joe Kelly was amongst those who occupied the visitors' gallery. A meeting held the following day did little to resolve the conflict, with the sit-in continuing for almost two months until 22 March.

On 18 February 2009, 13,000 civil servants voted for industrial action over a proposed pension levy. They effected this action on 26 February.

Days earlier, as many as 120,000 people, had protested on the streets of Dublin on 21 February. This was followed by a further march through the capital by gardaí on 25 February and a lunch-time protest by 10,000 civil servants on 19 March 2009. This was followed by two separate taxi drivers' protests in Dublin on 20 March 2009.

Labour leader Eamon Gilmore said at the time that a national strike would serve the country no good.

==== National Asset Management Agency ====
In April 2009, the government proposed a National Asset Management Agency (NAMA) to take over large loans from the banks, enabling them to return to normal liquidity to assist in the economic recovery. NAMA's first appraisal was in September 2009, fortuitously timed just before the issue of the second one-year bank guarantee.

==== Increasing debt spiral ====
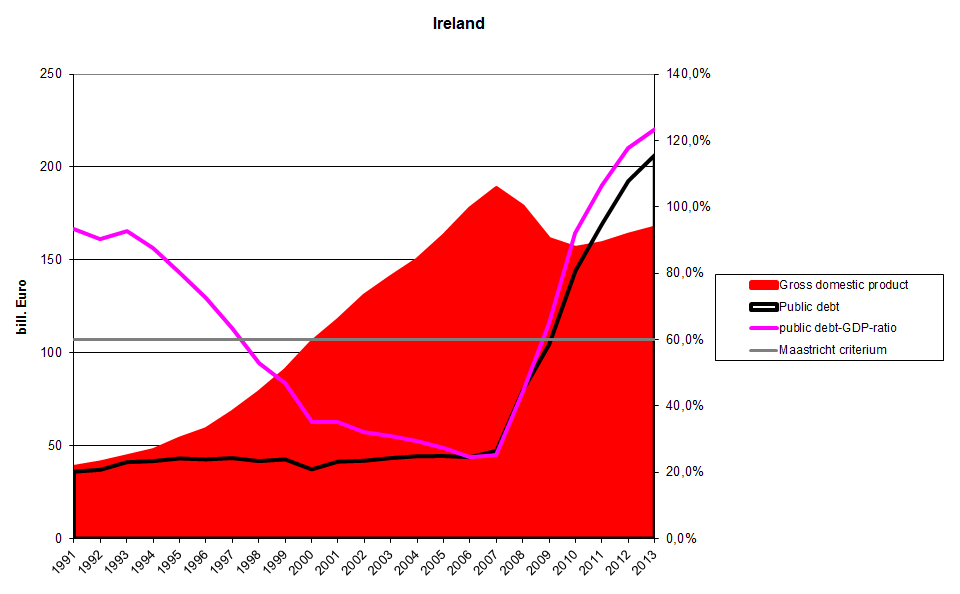
Public debt, gross domestic product (GDP), and public debt-to-GDP ratio. Graph based on "ameco" data from the European Commission.

The costs of the bank rescues, NAMA and government deficits over the period look set to push Irish National Debt up to a ratio of 125% of GDP by 2015.

However, there have been several misleading estimates of debt statistics relating to the Post-2008 Irish economic downturn. Ireland, like Luxembourg, is home to a disproportionately large number of international financial services providers. Many statistical calculations include the debts of all banks located in Ireland without separating foreign owned banks from Irish banks. The liabilities of the Irish banks represent a figure equivalent to approximately 309% of GDP, the third highest in the EU.

==== Croke Park Agreement ====
The Irish Government and Irish Public Sector unions, including IMPACT, negotiated the Croke Park Agreement which provided for increased productivity, flexibility and savings from the public sector in exchange for no further pay cuts, and no lay offs.

=== 2010: Bank bail-outs and protests ===
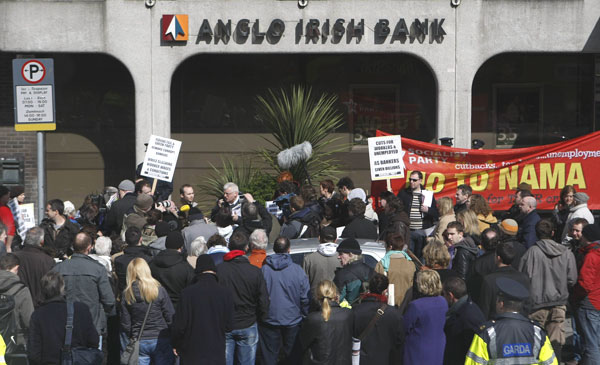
Joe Higgins, MEP, speaking during 2010 banking crisis protest against bailout of Anglo Irish Bank, Dublin

==== Economic Adjustment Programme for Ireland ====
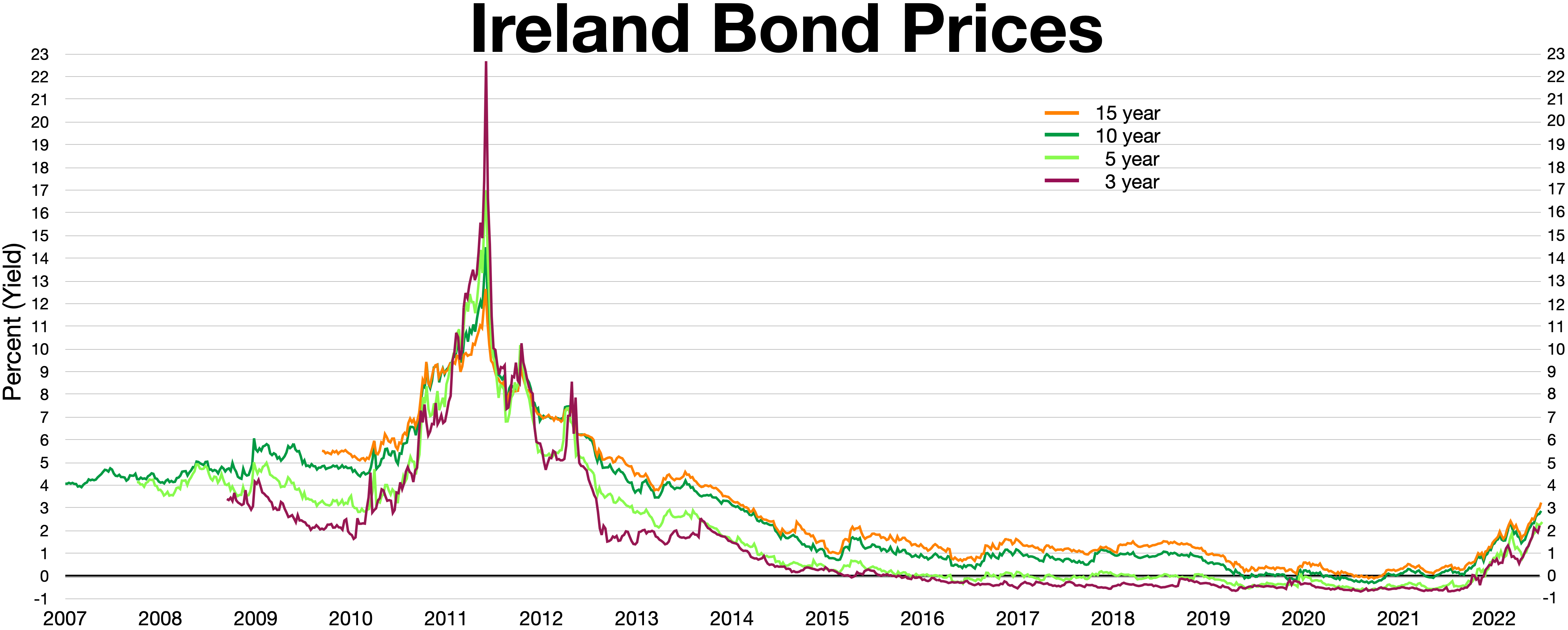
Ireland bond prices, Inverted yield curve in 2011 15 year bond 10 year bond 5 year bond 3 year bond

In April 2010, following a marked increase in Irish 2-year bond yields, Ireland's NTMA state debt agency said that it had "no major refinancing obligations" in 2010. Its requirement for €20 billion in 2010 was matched by a €23 billion cash balance, and it remarked: "We're very comfortably circumstanced". On 18 May the NTMA tested the market and sold a €1.5 billion issue that was three times oversubscribed. By September 2010 the banks could not raise finance and the bank guarantee was renewed for a third year. This had a negative impact on Irish government bonds, government help for the banks rose to 32% of GDP, and so the government started negotiations with the ECB and the IMF.

On the evening of 21 November 2010, the then Taoiseach Brian Cowen confirmed that Ireland had formally requested financial support from the European Union's European Financial Stability Facility (EFSF) and the International Monetary Fund (IMF), a request which was welcomed by the European Central Bank and EU finance ministers. The request was approved in principle by the finance ministers of the eurozone countries in a telephone conference call. Details of the financial arrangement were not immediately agreed upon, and remained to be determined in the following weeks, though the loan was believed to be in the region of €100 billion, of which approximately €8 billion was expected to be provided by the United Kingdom.

Following criticism of the action, the Green Party leader John Gormley signalled that his party would seek a general election in January 2011, with the implicit threat being that they would pull out of Government; with the addition of a number of Independent government TDs declaring that they would not continue to support the Government and speculation mounting, Brian Cowen called a press conference in which he announced that the Government intended to introduce and pass that year's Budget, and its constituent parliamentary bills, before having the 2011 election.

However, on 23 November, rebel members of Brian Cowen's ruling Fianna Fáil party and opposition leaders sought no-confidence vote for the Government and dissolution of the Oireachtas before a crucial budget vote on 7 December 2010, that should open the way for adopting the rescue package.

On 28 November, the European Union, International Monetary Fund and the Irish state agreed to an €85 billion rescue deal made up of €22.5 billion from the IMF, €22.5 billion from the European Financial Stability Facility (EFSF), €17.5 billion from the Irish sovereign National Pension Reserve Fund (NPRF) and bilateral loans from the United Kingdom, Denmark and Sweden.

Eurogroup President Jean-Claude Juncker said that the deal includes €10 billion for bank recapitalisation, €25 billion for banking contingencies and €50 billion for financing the budget.

==== Protests against austerity ====
2010 saw several notable protests against austerity in Ireland.

=== 2011: Government collapse ===
==== Collapse of the Cowen government ====
On 6 February 2011, it was revealed that Ireland had received a first €3.6 billion of the rescue package from the EFSF. This is a slightly higher amount than was previously expected mostly due to the better than expected auction of the EFSF bonds in January 2011. Later that month the coalition government of Fianna Fáil and the Green Party lost the 2011 general election and were replaced by a coalition made up of Fine Gael and the Labour Party.

In April 2011, despite all the measures taken, Moody's downgraded the Irish banks' debt to junk status. Debate continues on whether the new government will need a "second bailout". By August 2011 the largest of the six state-guaranteed banks, Bank of Ireland, had a market capitalisation of €2.86 billion, but loans to the six by the ECB and the Irish Central Bank were about €150 billion. Consumer research by British discount retailer Poundland found that the term "eurozone" had negative associations. When expanding to the Republic in 2011 the company branded its stores as "Dealz", despite the CEO stating that "Euroland" would be "the obvious choice".

==== Student actions ====
As the year went on students became increasingly concerned about the honesty and integrity of the pledge signed by Ruairi Quinn before the election that the Labour Party would oppose increased tuition fees.

On 16 November 2011, thousands of students, their parents and families, descended on Dublin from around the country and marched on Government Buildings amid concerns about the reintroduction of third-level fees. A small group also engaged in a sit-down protest outside the Fine Gael office on Dublin's Upper Mount Street.

At around 16:00 on 29 November 2011, three student union presidents (of Galway-Mayo Institute of Technology, University College Cork and IT Carlow) under the leadership of Union of Students in Ireland (USI) President Gary Redmond occupied a room at Department of Social Protection on Dublin's Store Street as part of a continued effort to have the Labour Party clarify its position on tuition fees. Gardai broke down the door of the room in which they were stationed and led them away. The students came armed with a chemical toilet and supplies of food that could have lasted them weeks. Ten student union presidents also attempted to occupy a room at the Department of Enterprise on Kildare Street for the same reasons.

Nine students, also seeking clarification on the government's view on third-level fees, participated in a peaceful sit-down protest by occupying the constituency office of Fine Gael TD and former mayor Brian Walsh in Bohermore, Galway, around midday on 30 November 2011. They unfurled a banner on the roof with the message, "FREE EDUCATION NOTHING LESS". They were imprisoned by the police and released a short time later.

On 2 December 2011, eight students from the National University of Ireland, Maynooth (NUIM), including the university's student union president Rob Munnelly, began occupying the Naas constituency office of Fine Gael TD Anthony Lawlor. They did so with sleeping bags, clothes, a chemical toilet and a week's supply of food and were supported by other students on Facebook and Twitter. During the occupation Munnelly debated with Lawlor live on Kildare TV, USI President Gary Redmond visited the revolting students and a banner with the slogan "SAVE THE GRANT" was erected at Lawlor's entrance.

==== Other protest actions ====
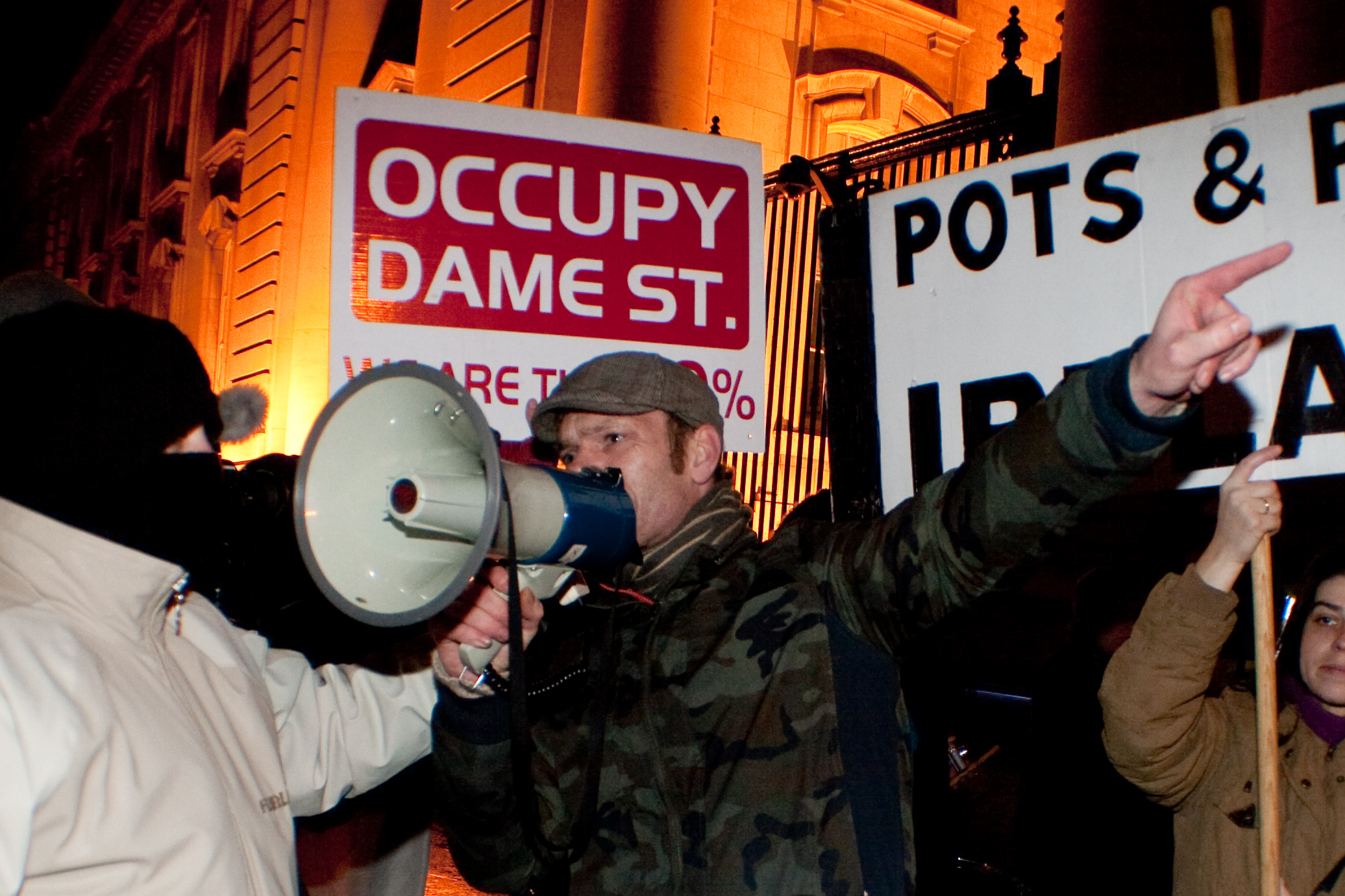
Occupy Dame Street outside Leinster House on 6 December 2011

The closure of the Accident & Emergency Department at Roscommon hospital led to continued protests by the Roscommon Hospital Action Committee.

Occupy Dame Street began on 8 October 2011, a Saturday afternoon.

On 26 November 2011, thousands of people marched against austerity in Dublin.

On 1 December 2011, Roscrea District Court solicitors staged a walkout over the courthouse's closure.

Hundreds of people from County Donegal converged on Buncrana on 3 December 2011 to protest against austerity and to tell the government that "Inishowen and Donegal says no to further cuts and austerity".

The Vita Cortex sit-in began in Cork on 16 December 2011.

There was also rebellion within the ranks of government. On 15 November 2011, Willie Penrose resigned as Minister of State for Housing and Planning due to his opposition to the Government's decision to close the army barracks in Mullingar. He also resigned the Labour parliamentary party whip. Tommy Broughan TD was expelled from the Labour Party on 1 December 2011 after voting to reject a government amendment to extend the bank guarantee for another year. Later that month, Patrick Nulty, another Labour TD, also voted against the government.

=== 2012: Occupy and Fiscal referendum ===
In January 2012, Taoiseach Enda Kenny denied Ireland would need a second bailout but admitted "very significant economic challenges" were ahead.

==== Industrial action ====
The Vita Cortex sit-in continued in Cork.

On 27 March, 2,104 jobs were lost as video games retail company Game closed 277 stores. Staff began a sit-in.

==== Occupy ====
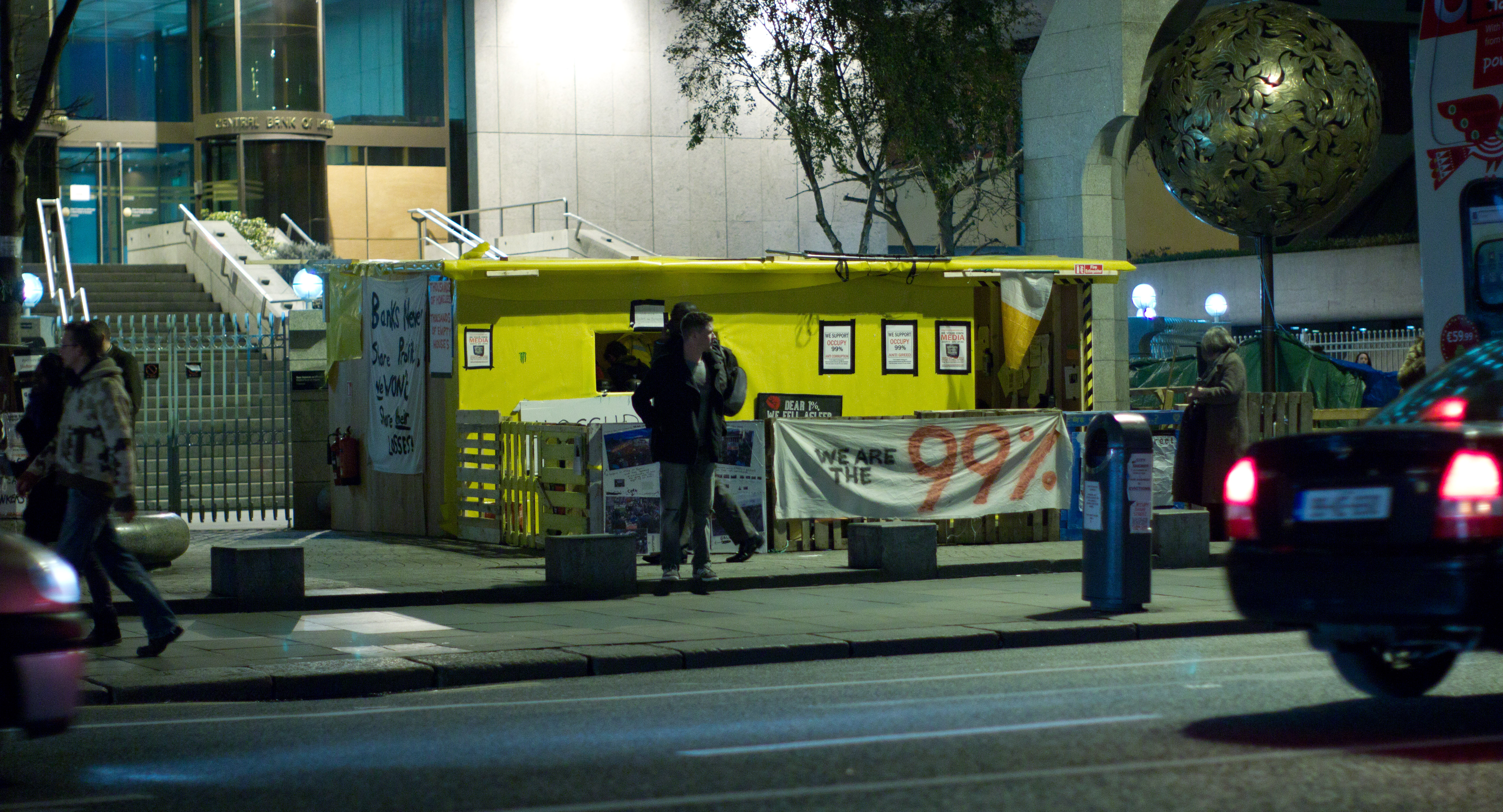
The Occupy Dame Street camp in Dublin.

Occupy Dame Street continued in Dublin. In January, Occupy Cork occupied a building in the city, while Occupy Belfast took over the Bank of Ireland in the city.

==== Protests ====
While attending a buffet at a Letterkenny hotel on 24 February 2012, Transport Minister Leo Varadkar was heckled and booed by local residents who repeatedly shouted "Shame on you" at him. On 25 February 2012, demonstrators protesting against the downgrading of schools in Bunbeg, County Donegal, marched on the office of their local TD, Fine Gael Junior Minister Dinny McGinley. There were also protests in County Mayo on the same day.

On 31 March, Ireland was reported by international media to be facing a popular revolt after government figures indicated less than half of the country's households had paid the new property tax by that day's deadline as thousands of people from across the country marched on the governing Fine Gael party's Ard Fheis at the Convention Centre Dublin. The previous evening, Justice minister Alan Shatter was involved in controversy after telling those who objected to the government's Household Charge to "get a life", remarks made on his way into the Fine Gael annual conference at the Convention Centre.

In April 2012, the ruling Labour Party held its centenary conference in the Bailey Allen Hall at NUI Galway. Gardaí used pepper spray to hold back anti-austerity demonstrators after they broke through a Garda barrier while protesting against government.

In October 2012, the ministerial car of Tánaiste Eamon Gilmore was subjected to eggings and kickings by protesters against cuts in Dublin.

==== Referendum on Fiscal Stability Treaty ====
In 2012 the government sought to ratify the Treaty on Stability, Coordination and Governance in the Economic and Monetary Union. The Attorney General advised that a referendum was required to ensure consistency with the constitution. Consequently, the Thirtieth Amendment of the Constitution of Ireland was passed on 31 May with 60.3% in favour on a turnout of 50%. This enshrined the Fiscal Treaty into Article 29 of the constitution.

=== 2013: IBRC and bailout exit ===
==== Liquidation of IBRC ====
Logo of IBRC

On the night of 6–7 February 2013, the Irish Bank Resolution Corporation (IBRC) was dramatically liquidated after the Fine Gael/Labour coalition passed emergency overnight legislation through the Oireachtas while President Michael D. Higgins was flown home from the three-day official visit to Italy upon which he had embarked that very morning. This was the night before the Irish Supreme Court was due to hear an appeal by a Dublin business man, David Hall, against the High Court's ruling that he did not have the standing or locus standi to challenge the legality of the €3.06 billion promissory note payment that was due at the end of March. Hall's original argument before the High Court was that the payment of the €31 billion in promissory notes in respect of the now defunct Anglo Irish Bank was illegal as their issuing in 2010 was not approved by a Dáil vote. Every IBRC employee had their employment terminated with immediate effect, with many learning of this as it was announced on national television station TV3.

Dáil Éireann was called into session for 22:30 on 6 February 2013. The Opposition did not have a copy of the proposed legislation to debate with five minutes before this. They had received copies by 22:32 and the Dáil session was then delayed until 23:00. Fine Gael TD Jerry Buttimer tweeted a photo of the Bill at 22:35.

Minister Michael Noonan blamed the rush on a leak to foreign media. Ursula Halligan said on TV3 that the "leak came from Frankfurt's end".

The proposed legislation eventually passed in the Dáil by 113 to 35 at 03:00. In Seanad Éireann it passed by 38 to 6. President Michael D. Higgins rushed home from his visit to Rome and signed the Irish Bank Resolution Corporation Bill 2013 into law at Áras an Uachtaráin early on 7 February 2013.

The Opposition criticised the suddenness with which the legislation was rushed through. Many deputies did not have time to read it. The range of opposition TDs critical of it included Joe Higgins, Catherine Murphy, Richard Boyd Barrett, Luke 'Ming' Flanagan, Mick Wallace, Thomas Pringle and Mattie McGrath. According to Independent TD Stephen Donnelly in a speech addressed to Minister Noonan in the chamber,

If and when you vote yes to this legislation, you will be moving €28bn as a debt to 2 dead banks, under criminal investigation, from that, to the European Central Bank. The ECB is legally not allowed write any of that debt down. The other thing it does, Minister, is it gives you power to issue securities. What that means is that you're going to be able to sit down with Patrick Honohan and Mario Draghi and say "Let's all agree to turn this 28 yr promissory note into a 40-year bond." And we in this house will have no say, we will have no vote because we will be giving you that authority in this bill.

Donnelly also warned that Section 17 of the Bill "could be ruled unconstitutional" and described the Bill and the manner of its attempted introduction as "very, very dangerous" and "a fundamental erosion of parliamentary democracy." He suggested that Noonan withdraw the bill and return to the Dáil "before the courts open for business in the morning, with the minimal legislation needed to protect state assets."

Ireland's mainstream media overwhelmingly supported the legislation, though Vincent Browne called it "lunatic stuff" on TV3. On 7 February, RTÉ lunchtime newsreader Sean O'Rourke described it as a "breakthrough in Ireland's attempt to lift the debt burden". The 8 February edition of The Irish Times contained a section dedicated to the issue, which was described as resembling "a press release from the Department of Finance". Much of the media focused on the funny little tweets which members of the public contributed to the #promnight hashtag, with some saying they had, in common with many of the politicians in the Dáil, fallen asleep.

On 17 February 2013, the Chief Financial Officer of Anglo Irish Bank, Maarten van Eden, tendered his resignation writing that "I have no confidence whatsoever in the ability of government to do the right thing for the financial sector." and describing the government's actions on the promissory note as "pure window dressing".

==== Exit from bailout ====
Ireland officially exited the Troika bailout in December 2013. Taoiseach Enda Kenny gave an address to mark this official end, in which he said the country was moving in the right direction and claimed the economy was starting to recover. Commentators, including Gene Kerrigan and Vincent Browne, questioned its significance to the Irish economy, and many viewed it as a cosmetic public relations exercise. On 13 March 2013, Ireland managed to regain complete lending access on financial markets, when it successfully issued €5bn of 10-year maturity bonds at a yield of 4.3%. After having ended its bailout programme as scheduled in December 2013, there was no need for additional bailout support.

=== Signs of recovery since 2014 ===
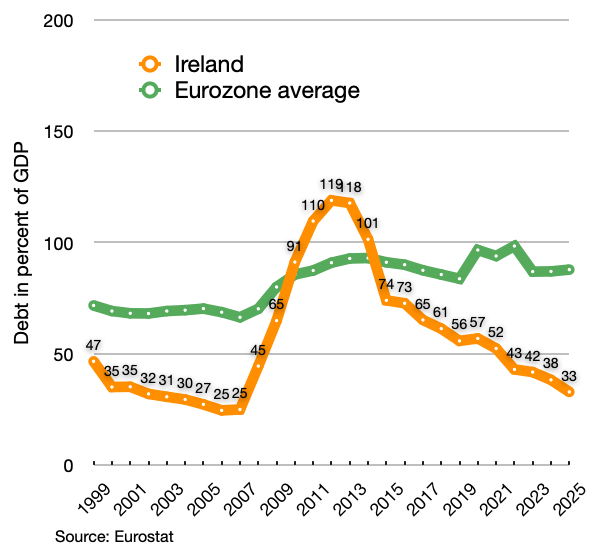
Debt of Ireland compared to eurozone average since 1999

After the bailout exit, the economy started to recover, recording growth of 4.8% in 2014. National debt fell to 109% of GDP and the budget deficit fell to 3.1% in the fourth quarter of 2014.

However, opinion polls for the Fine Gael-Labour coalition in 2014 showed that approval ratings for government policies continued to drop and after numerous allegations of Gardaí malpractice resulted in the Minister for Justice Alan Shatter resigning and Taoiseach Enda Kenny awarding himself the office of Minister of Defence. As well as this the Government had formally established Irish Water, a company to charge people for water usage and had begun to install water metres in front of every property across the country, which caused huge controversy and protest throughout Ireland.

During 2015, unemployment fell from 10.1% to 8.8%, while the economy grew by an estimated 6.7%. In November 2015, it was reported that exchequer receipts were €3 Billion ahead of target and that the government's tax revenues had risen by 10.5% throughout 2015. During 2015, Fine Gael rose in the opinion polls, while their coalition partner Labour struggled to rise above 10%.

In 2016 there was significant attention on the accuracy and reliability of figures that indicated economic recovery. CSO figures—which seemed to indicate that Irish GDP rose by 26.3 per cent year-on-year 2015 to 2016—were acknowledged as being skewed by the profits of a small number of multinationals and some shell companies. The term "Leprechaun economics" was coined to describe this phenomenon. In 2017, the Anti-Austerity Alliance renamed itself Solidarity to shift its focus away from the economy.

== See also ==
- Anti-austerity movement in Ireland
- Euro area crisis
- Put on the green jersey
