= Occupy Dame Street =

Peaceful protest in Ireland (2011–2012)

- Part of the Occupy movement and anti-austerity protests in Ireland
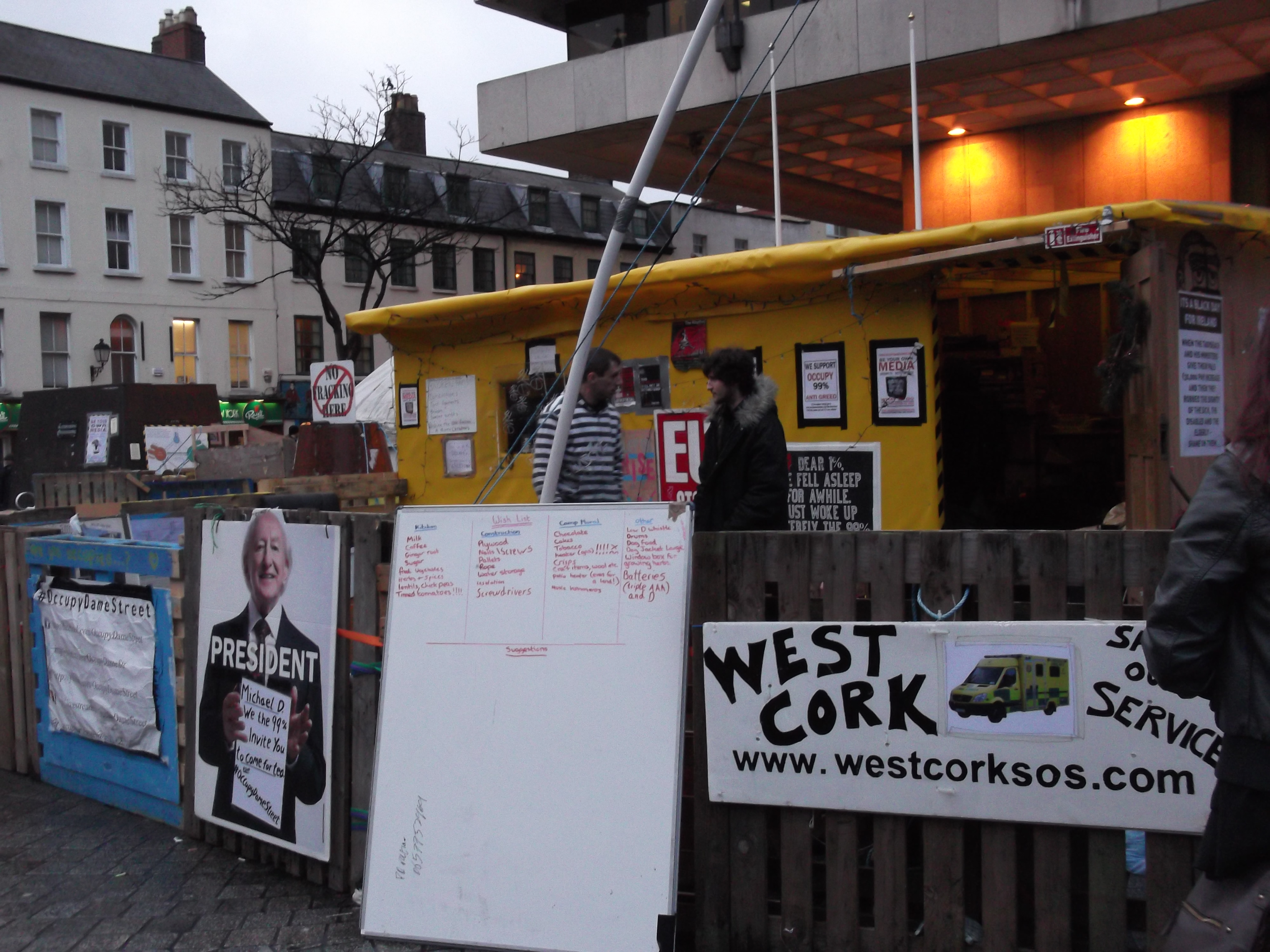
- The entrance to Occupy Dame Street's "Tent Town" on 19 December 2011
- Date: From 8 October 2011 to 8 March 2012
- Location: Dublin, Ireland
- Caused by: Economic inequality, corporate influence over government, Populism, inter alia.
- Methods: Demonstration; Occupation; Nonviolent protest; Street protest; Internet activism

Number
- 2,000+

Occupy Dame Street (ODS) or Occupy Dublin was a peaceful protest and demonstration against economic inequality, social injustice and corporate greed taking place outside the Central Bank of Ireland plaza on Dame Street in Dublin, beside the Temple Bar area of the city. Part of the global Occupy movement, it took its name from the Occupy Wall Street demonstration in New York City's Wall Street financial district. Occupy Dame Street had four requests: the withdrawal of the EU/IMF from Ireland, an end to public ownership of private debt, the return to public ownership of Ireland's privatised oil and gas reserves, and the implementation of what the movement describes as "real participatory democracy". The national police force, Garda Síochána, dismantled their camp during a late-night raid on 8 March 2012. The protesters vowed to fight on. Some were never heard of again, while others found other channels of protest. The most detailed account and analysis of events was written by Helena Sheehan.

== Timeline ==
=== 2011 ===
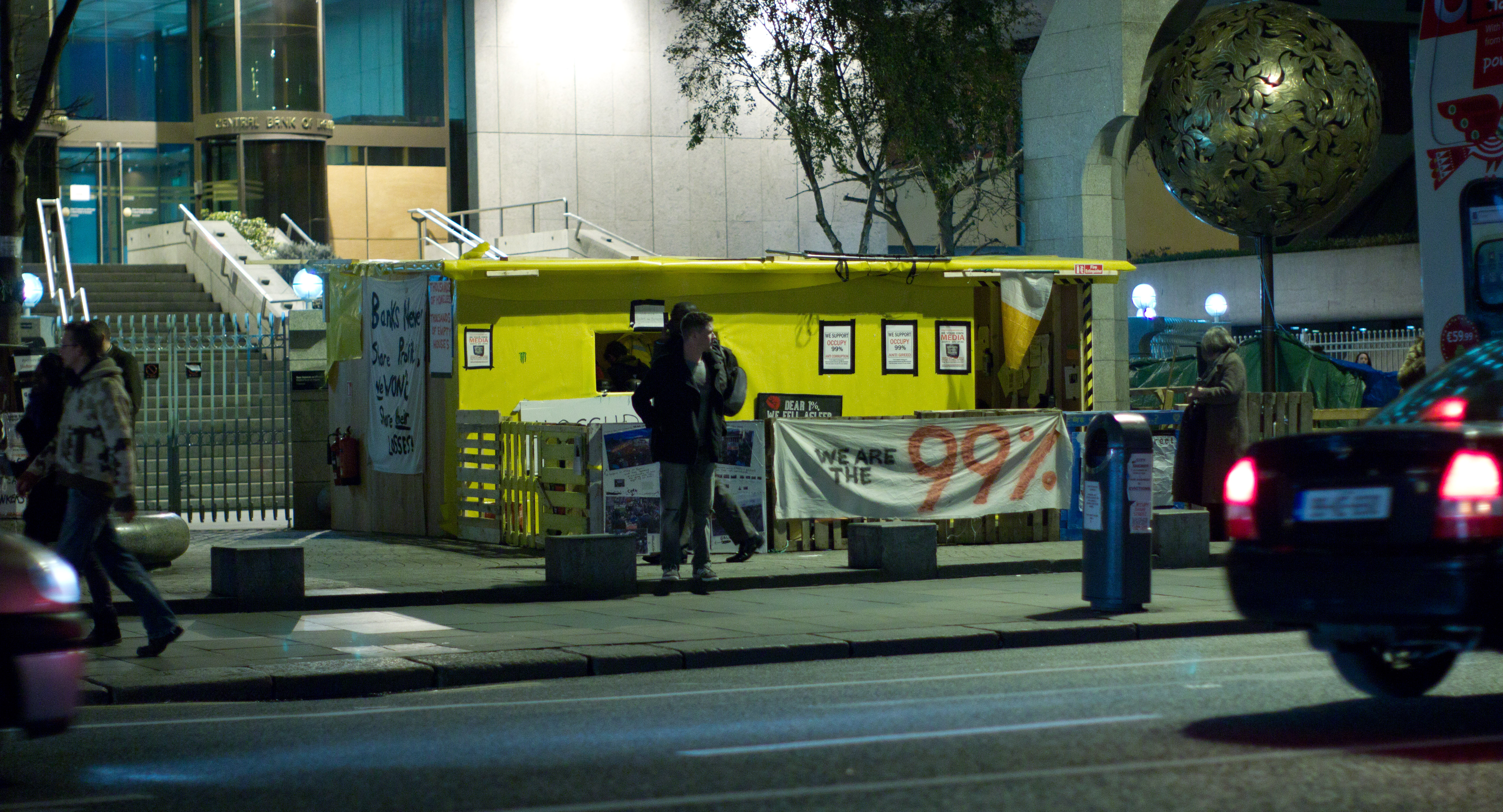
Occupy Dame Street Camp in November 2011

The movement started with a series of assemblies at the Seomra Spraoi social centre. Then, after an online Facebook and Twitter campaign, the occupation began on 8 October 2011, a Saturday afternoon, initially with around 60 protesters who set up camp in tents outside the Central Bank's head office on Dame Street. The tents were attached to each other and were not pegged to the concrete as that would not be permitted. A free Wi-Fi connection was established anonymously in the first days of the movement. The original group was then joined by further people during the days that followed. Around 1,000 people passed through the encampment from the afternoon of 8 October and the afternoon of 11 October. On 22 October, a demonstration in Dublin city centre organised by the group was reported to have over 2,000 in attendance, including English left-wing activist and alternative rock musician Billy Bragg.

On 12 November 2011, organisers of the movement marched from the Garden of Remembrance at Parnell Square to their "Tent Town" outside the Central Bank. In mid-November 2011, the Central Bank of Ireland announced it would seek a court order to put an end to the protest taking place outside its headquarters.

The group gained the support of Irish musicians Christy Moore, Damien Dempsey and Glen Hansard, who all played separately at the group's "Tent Town" on 8, 23 and 24 December respectively.

=== 2012 ===
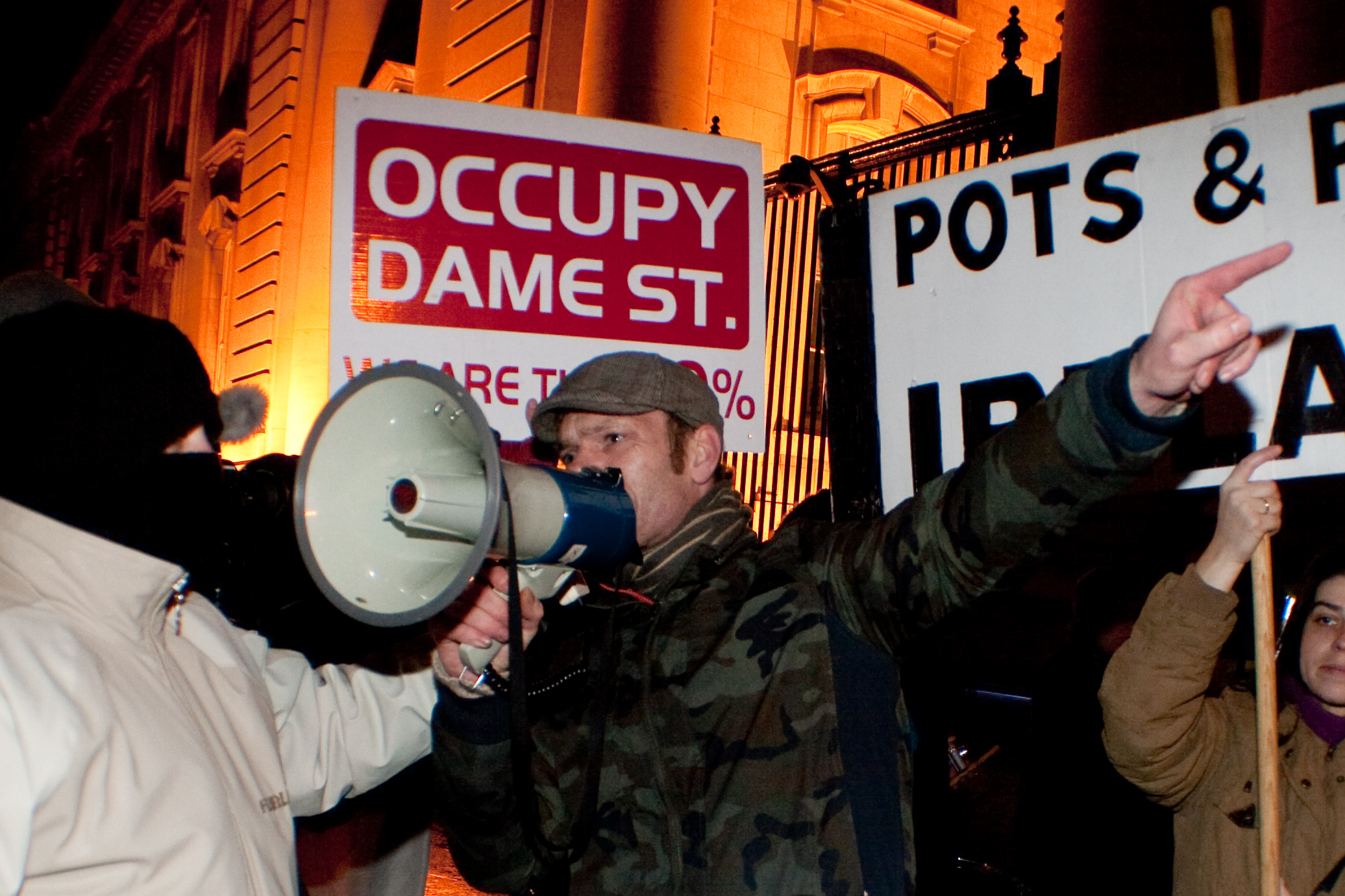
An Occupy Dame Street sign was present outside Dáil Éireann as the Irish government delivered its budget on 6 December 2011.

The group began their 'Occupy Nama' strategy, whereby group members non-violently occupy NAMA owned buildings for a brief period of time, usually until the intervention of Garda Síochána

Authorities requested the protesters to postpone the camp for the Saint Patrick's Day Parade. Parade Grand Marshal Johnny Giles also suggested the protest move for the parade.

Until March 2012, Occupy Dame Street continued to engage in organised meetings, events and actions. Occupy Dame Street's camp was dismantled by Gardaí in the early hours of 8 March during which time some 15 protesters affiliated with the group were present. Protesters announced a demonstration at the Central Bank for later that day and vowed that the destruction of their camp does not mean their quest for justice is over. on the evening of 8 March over 70 people took part in a spontaneous march from Dame Street to a nearby Garda station on Pearse Street in protest of the removal of the camp.

== Features ==
Aubrey Robinson, the son of former President of Ireland Mary Robinson, is among the people to have participated. The movement held assemblies at 18:00 three days per week. Occupy movement hand signals were encouraged instead of loud cheers.

== Responses ==
In 2011, local Garda Síochána described the movement as "peaceful" and "well behaved". In March 2012, they dismantled the Occupy Dame Street camp.

Dublin City Council received one complaint, but a spokeswoman said: "As it is private property, Dublin City Council has no authority to move these people". This is because the encampment is clear of the public footpath.

Some local businesspeople had complained about the camp saying it affected their businesses.

In December 2011, TD Aengus Ó Snodaigh and Luke 'Ming' Flanagan praised the efforts of the group in interviews to RTÉ Radio 1.

On 9 October 2011, the United States Embassy in Dublin warned its citizens to avoid the area where the protest movement is occurring.

== See also ==
- Anti-austerity protests in Ireland
- List of Occupy movement protest locations
- Post-2008 Irish banking crisis
- Post-2008 Irish economic downturn
