= March for a Better Way =

March for a Better Way was a demonstration held in Dublin on Saturday 27 November 2010 at 11:30 am. Organised by the Irish Congress of Trade Unions (ICTU), it followed Ireland's admission of the EU/ECB/IMF troika.

The demonstration was one of the largest to ever take place in Ireland, with an estimated 100,000 people in attendance.

The Irish Independent described it as the largest trade union march of 2010.

The march route was from Wood Quay to the General Post Office on O'Connell Street and 50,000 people participated.

== See also ==
- 2010 student protest in Dublin
