= Vanderhoef =

Vanderhoef is a surname. Notable people with the surname include:

- Larry N. Vanderhoef (1941–2015), American biochemist and academic
- Marion Vanderhoef (1894–1985), American tennis player
