= UC Davis pepper spray incident =

Occupy movement event in 2011

Coordinates: 38°32′28.0″N 121°44′57.6″W

- Part of the Occupy movement
- News coverage of the pepper spraying incident was shown around the world.
- Location: Davis, California, US
- Date: November 18, 2011; 4:01 pm (Pacific)
- Target: UC Davis students
- Weapon: MK-9 pepper spray
- Deaths: 0
- Injuries: 11
- Perpetrators: UC Davis Police, Linda Katehi

The UC Davis pepper spray incident occurred on November 18, 2011, during an Occupy movement demonstration at the University of California, Davis. After asking the protesters to leave several times, university police pepper sprayed a group of student demonstrators as they were seated on a paved path in the campus quad. The video of UC Davis police officer Lt. John Pike pepper-spraying demonstrators spread around the world as a viral video and the photograph became an Internet meme. Officer Alex Lee also pepper sprayed demonstrators at Pike's direction.

Pike was subsequently fired, despite a recommendation that he face disciplinary action but be kept on the job. As of August 2014, Alex Lee was no longer listed in a state salary-database as working at UC Davis. In October 2013, a judge ruled that Pike should be paid $38,000 in worker's compensation benefits, for "[the] suffering he experienced after the incident." Apart from the worker's compensation award, he retained his retirement credits. The three dozen student demonstrators, meanwhile, were collectively awarded $1 million by UC Davis in a settlement from a federal lawsuit, with each pepper sprayed student receiving $30,000 individually.

After the incident, large protests against the use of pepper spray occurred on campus. UC Davis Chancellor Linda Katehi apologized to the students, saying that the police had acted against her orders for there to be no arrests and no use of force. A public debate about the militarization of police and the appropriate use of pepper spray on peaceful protesters took place in the media, with questions raised about the freedom of speech and the right to peaceably assemble guaranteed by the First Amendment to the United States Constitution.

== Synopsis ==
On 18 November 2011, campus police officer Lt. John Pike pepper sprayed nonviolent demonstrators at UC Davis. The demonstrations were primarily in response to tuition hikes at the university, and more broadly aligned with the Occupy movement. The specific triggering event for the incident was the refusal of the demonstrators to comply with an order to remove their encampment.

According to The New York Times, multiple videos show a peaceful demonstration with officers "freely moving about". According to U.C. Davis police chief Annette Spicuzza, the protesters had surrounded the officers and would not let them leave.

Following the incident, the campus police chief and two officers were placed on administrative leave. UC Davis student and faculty organizations called for the resignation of Linda Katehi, chancellor of UC Davis. Katehi requested an inquiry into the incident and, in response, Mark Yudof, president of the University of California system appointed a task force to investigate the incident. The task force was composed of students, faculty, staff, and members from the UC community and led by former California Supreme Court Justice and UC Davis Professor Emeritus of Law, Cruz Reynoso.

President Yudof also contracted Kroll Inc. and its chairman, former Los Angeles Police Chief William J. Bratton, to conduct the factual investigation and a review of police procedures for the task force. The Davis Division of the UC Academic Senate (the faculty of the University of California) conducted their own, separate investigation concurrently as well. Personnel in the Yolo County district attorney's office and Yolo County sheriff's department also reviewed the pepper spray incident to determine whether there was any "criminal conduct". Finally, President Yudof instructed Christopher Edley, dean of the UC Berkeley School of Law, and Charles Robinson, general counsel for the University of California, to conduct a separate review of protocols concerning non-violent protests at all ten UC campuses.

Alleged use of excessive force by police against students and demonstrators was said to be part of a larger pattern observed within the state of California and across the United States. The board of the Council of UC Faculty Associations said that "police violence" was used against non-violent demonstrators at UC Davis, UCLA, UC Berkeley and at a Cal State Board of Trustees meeting in Long Beach. Rep. Jerrold Nadler of New York's 8th congressional district and ranking member of the United States House Judiciary Subcommittee on the Constitution, sent a letter to United States Attorney General Eric Holder requesting that the United States Department of Justice investigate the actions of law enforcement during the nationwide Occupy protests to determine if the civil liberties of demonstrators and reporters were violated. According to Nadler, Occupy UC Davis was one of at least eight separate events recorded on video at Occupy demonstrations throughout the United States where "significant and unwarranted force in making arrests" occurred.

As of March 2012, Occupy UC Davis continued to engage in organized meetings, events, and UC Davis-specific actions, in addition to joining actions of allied occupations such as those of Oakland, UC Berkeley, and Woodland.

On July 31, 2012, a UC Davis spokesman announced that Pike was no longer employed by the university. Nearly a year later, on July 27, 2013, it was reported that Pike had filed for workers compensation, and hoped to receive a monetary award for what he termed a "psychiatric injury" due to threats he received after his identity was made public. A settlement conference was scheduled for August 13, 2013. In October 2013, it was reported that Joel Harter, an administrative law judge for the California Division of Workers' Compensation, had approved a settlement totaling $38,056 for Pike. Apart from the settlement, Pike also retained his retirement credits earned from his employment by the University of California.

The school spent considerable funds (upwards of $175,000) to kill off traces of the incident on the internet.

== Background ==
In 2009, the University of California Regents approved a 32% (compounded for the year) tuition hike for the 2009–2010 school year. The following years saw several large protests and actions across California in response to tuition hikes and other complaints against the UC administration, including 52 arrested on November 19, 2009 and an attempt to block the local interstate on March 4, 2010. During February 2010, a communique titled "After the Fall: COMMUNIQUÉS FROM OCCUPIED CALIFORNIA" was published that analyzed and summarized an autumn of radical action in terms that resonated with the later Occupy Wall Street movement/tactic.

Occupy Wall Street (OWS) began on September 17, 2011, in New York City's Zuccotti Park in the Wall Street financial district with protests focused on social and economic inequality, high unemployment, greed, as well as corruption, and the undue influence of corporations—particularly that of the financial services sector—on government. The protesters' slogan, We are the 99%, refers to the growing difference in wealth in the U.S. between the wealthiest 1% and the rest of the population. The protests grew into a worldwide movement known as the Occupy movement and make use of a variety of civil disobedience tactics. Occupy Cal grew out of this movement as a series of protests at UC Berkeley.

A major theme of the Occupy demonstrations at California public universities was the role of education in creating jobs and improving the quality of life of society and the contrasting failure of the UC Regents and the State of California to honor commitments made in the California Master Plan for Higher Education. 81% tuition increases for students, mandatory furloughs (including for professors), firings of lower-ranking workers (especially those working directly with students), and well-publicized raises for the highest paid administrators have further fueled discontent both within the University of California system (of which UC Davis is a part) and within the California State University system, which has also seen large tuition raises and consequent protests.

Occupy UC Davis (distinguished from the off-campus Occupy Davis) was a name used to refer to those responding to University of California police violence (specifically at Occupy Cal on November 9, 2011), and later grew to encompass other themes. Occupy Davis demonstrators occupied the city's Central Park in mid-October.

External videos
- Police beat and arrest students at UC Berkeley, November 9, 2011

On November 9, 2011 students and professors at UC Berkeley began with a series of teach-ins around campus, a noon rally, and a march. The event attracted approximately 1,500 demonstrators. Midday, protestors set up seven tents to symbolize their support for the Occupy movement. In response, law enforcement officials from UC Berkeley Police, the Alameda County Sheriff's Office and other UC Police officers, arrived in riot gear to remove the seven tents from the protest site.

Video footage of the afternoon confrontation showed police beating protesters with batons and dragging two protesters by the hair, one of whom was UC Berkeley English professor Celeste Langan. Thirty-nine protesters, including Langan, were arrested for charges including "resisting and delaying a police officer in the performance of their duties, and failure to disperse when given a dispersal order."

The ACLU expressed "grave concerns" about the use of batons on protesters. The UC Student Association released a statement saying "UC Students are outraged by the brutal tactics used by the UCPD against students." In response to the police brutality and other perceived failings of UC Berkeley chancellor Robert Birgeneau and the UC Regents, the Occupy Cal General Assembly called for a general UC strike on November 15, 2011. Other student groups from around the state announced plans to join in the protest. On November 11, the UC Davis Faculty Association also voted to endorse the November 15 systemwide strike. University Professor Bob Ostertag echoed these sentiments in a public letter about the earlier events at UC Berkeley:

Chancellor Robert Birgeneau thus joins the likes of Bull Connor, the notorious segregationist and architect of the violent repression of the civil rights movement in Birmingham, Alabama, as some of the very few people who view the non-violent tactics of Martin Luther King as violent.

The faculty of the UC Davis Department of English published a statement calling for "the disbanding of the UCPD and the institution of an ordinance against the presence of police forces on the UC Davis campus, unless their presence is specifically requested by a member of the campus community."

== Occupy UC Davis ==
=== Rallies and encampment ===
On Tuesday, November 15, 2011, several hundred demonstrators rallied on the quad to protest against proposals to increase tuition fees due to state budget cuts. UC Davis was subjected to a 40 percent cut in its general funds and a $130 million deficit in 2011. After marching to Mrak Hall in the administration building, 50 people stayed overnight and two tents were raised outside. The tents were later taken down after a representative for student affairs expressed concerns.

On Wednesday, November 16, 2011, the movement intensified within another of the three public higher education systems in California, namely the California State University (CSU) system, when protesters attempted to attend a meeting of the CSU Trustees. Protesters were sprayed with pepper spray. At least one student who was pepper sprayed was also put on her stomach by police, hog-tied and placed in handcuffs, which was a clear violation of CSU's own policies.

On Thursday, November 17, 2011, a group of Occupy UC Davis demonstrators once again set up tents, this time on the campus quad between Memorial Union and Shields Library. On November 18, Katehi, citing safety concerns about people from outside the UC Davis community participating in demonstrations on the campus, informed the Occupy UC Davis group in writing that the tents must be removed by 3:00 pm "in the interest of safety, respect for our campus environment and in accordance with our Principles of Community." According to Katehi, the Occupy group did not respond to this request, and they were further informed that if they did not remove the tents, they would be removed.

After being informed of the requests from the administration and police, some students removed their tents. University police announced at the General Assembly that the tents, still numbering approximately 25, would have to be removed by 3 pm.

=== Thanksgiving; winter break ===
Demonstrators held Thanksgiving in the quad with a local family donating 10 cooked turkeys and 100 pounds of mashed potatoes. By the end of the quarter, students began to dismantle the encampment on December 8 for winter break. Attorney Bernie Goldsmith told The Davis Enterprise that the Occupy demonstrators plan to return on January 9, 2012.

=== US Bank protests and subsequent bank closure ===
In January 2012, Occupy UC Davis protesters started a two-month-long blockade of the US Bank on the UC Davis campus. This autonomous action involved directly sitting in front of the bank, forcing the bank to effectively shut down every day. The protesters argued that private banks on a public campus created a clear conflict of interest and that collusion between banks and the UC regents, in the form of privatization, was the root cause of rising tuition. After the bank shut down, charges were filed against twelve of the protesters known as the "Davis Dozen" or "Banker's Dozen". They were charged with blocking a sidewalk and conspiracy. In May 2013 they accepted a plea agreement and were each convicted only of an infraction and sentenced to 80 hours of community service.

== Pepper spray incident ==
External media

Images
- Brian Nguyen's flickr set (The California Aggie)

Video
- Cops Pepper Spray Passive Protesters (Associated Press)

On November 18, 2011, police arrived wearing riot gear at 3:15 pm and began removing tents and arresting demonstrators obstructing the removal of tents at 3:35 pm. A group of demonstrators staged a sit-in on the walkway in the quad, linking arms together and refusing to move. This blockade prevented the Campus police from leaving. Campus police officers asked the demonstrators to move several times, but the students refused.

While students were sitting on the ground, in a circle, around the officers, they were asked to "leave peacefully." Sometime around 4 pm, two officers began spraying Defense Technology MK-9, 0.7% Orange Band pepper spray at almost "point-blank range" in the faces of the seated students. The pepper spray used, according to various websites, has a recommended minimum distance of six feet. Bystanders recorded the incident with cell-phone cameras, while members of the crowd chanted "Shame on you" and "Let them go" at the police officers. Eleven protesters received medical treatment; two were hospitalized.

According to the UC Davis police chief, the officers were forced to use pepper spray when students surrounded them. One of the officers who used pepper spray on the students was subsequently identified as Lieutenant John Pike. Ten arrests were made. Arrestees were "cited and released on misdemeanor charges of unlawful assembly and failure to disperse". Police began to leave the area around 4:10 pm as more students began to arrive.

== Aftermath ==
Pike and another unnamed UC Davis Police officer were placed on administrative leave shortly after the incident. UC Davis Police Chief Annette Spicuzza was later placed on leave as well.

=== Pepper spray inventor's reaction ===
Kamran Loghman, who helped develop pepper spray with the Federal Bureau of Investigation in the 1980s, stated that the incident at Davis "violated his original intent," adding he'd never seen "such an inappropriate and improper use of chemical agents." Loghman, who also had assisted in the development of guidelines for police departments using the spray, said that use-of-force manuals generally advise that pepper spray is appropriate "only if a person is physically threatening a police officer or another person."

=== Silent protest; Katehi asked to resign ===
On November 19, after holding a press conference, Katehi walked out of an administration building and was confronted by hundreds of silent demonstrators who lined the sidewalk as she made the three-block walk to a waiting vehicle. Katehi appeared on CNN shortly after, expressing some remorse but ultimately defending her actions. She also called for creation of a task force to review the incident and report their findings and recommendations within 90 days. Also that evening, the board of the UC Davis Faculty Association issued a statement calling for both the immediate resignation of the Chancellor and an end to police removal of non-violent demonstrators from the campus:

Given the recent use of excessive force by police against "occupy" protestors at UC Berkeley and elsewhere, the Chancellor must have anticipated that, by authorizing police action, she was effectively authorizing their use of excessive force against peaceful UCD student protestors. The Chancellor's role is to enable open and free inquiry, not to suppress it. We also call for a policy that will end the practice of forcibly removing non-violent student, faculty, staff, and community protestors by police on the UC Davis campus. The University of California should be taking a leadership role in encouraging the exercise of free speech, not in suppressing it.

External videos
- UC Davis chancellor sorry for pepper spray incident (Reuters)

The UC Davis Faculty Association is an advocacy group representing about 110 active tenured and tenure-track professors (about 4 percent of the more than 2,500 total faculty members at UC Davis). The largest faculty group – the Academic Senate – is composed of more than 1,500 tenured and tenure-track professors. In addition, there are another 1,000 faculty members on campus made up of adjunct professors, lecturers, University Extension educators and other non-tenure-track academic appointments. Linda Bisson, chair of the Academic Senate, called for a faculty investigation, but said she believed that most faculty members wanted Katehi to stay in her post. Later, in May 2012, the UC Davis Academic Senate Executive Council censured the chancellor. The UC Davis Graduate Student Association (GSA) had earlier censured Katehi on November 30, 2011.

On November 21, a General Assembly was held on the UC Davis campus. That body voted to stage a general strike on Monday, November 28 to prevent a vote by the UC regents on tuition increases.

=== Apology from Katehi ===
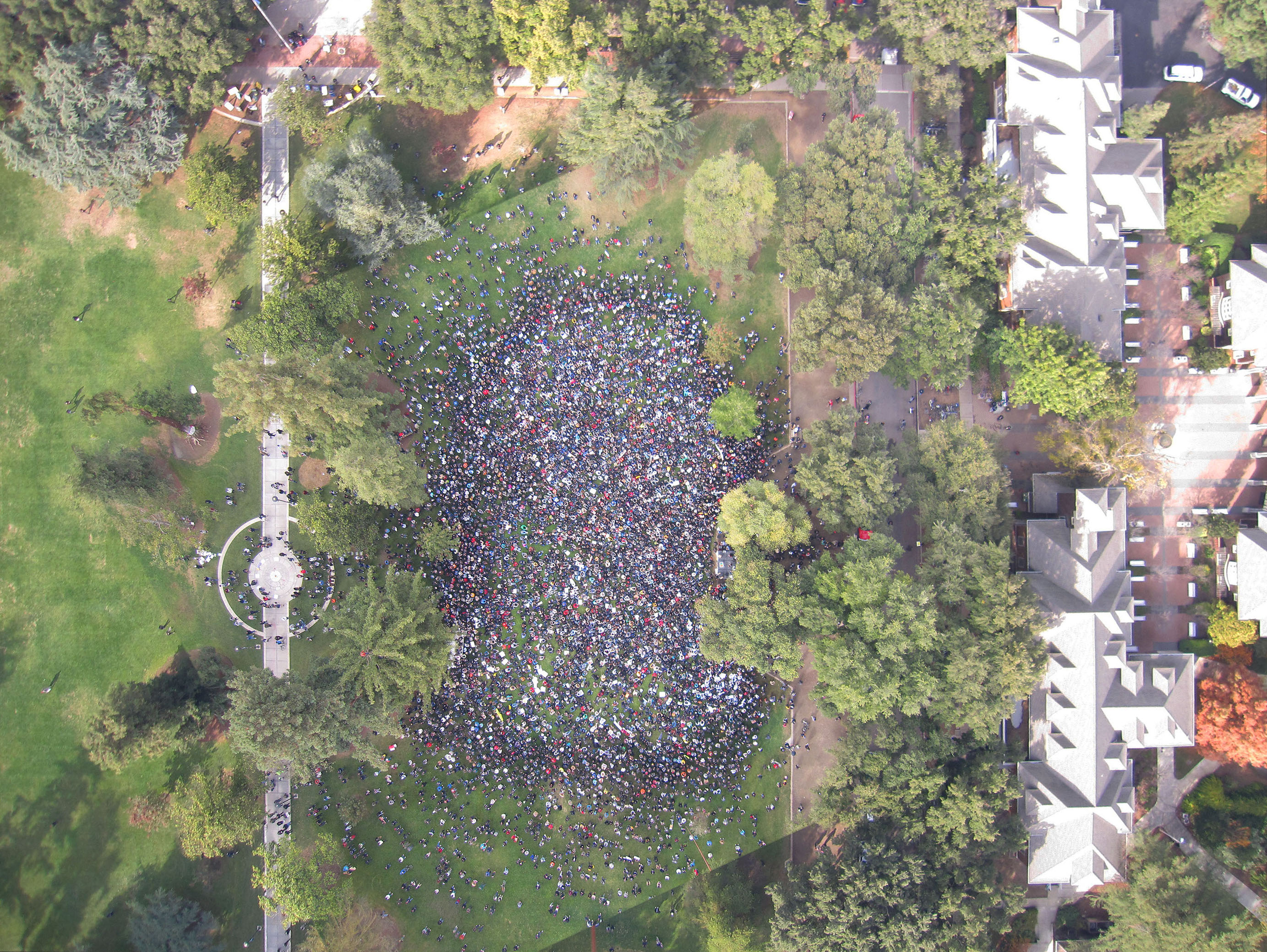
On November 21, 2011, the Public Laboratory for Open Technology and Science (PLOTS) launched a helium balloon and captured this image of the UC Davis community "gathered to voice their disapproval of the pepper spraying of non-violent protestors on campus".

On November 21, Katehi attended a large student protest attended by an estimated 5,000 people. After listening to their statements, Katehi said she was there to apologize. On the following day, she stated that the police had gone against her specific orders to act peacefully when removing tents or equipment, and not to proceed if there were too many students, and she had not approved the police use of riot gear. At a town hall meeting, she told around 1,000 students, "I want to unequivocally apologize to the entire community for the appalling use of pepper spray. I will do everything in my power to make sure nothing like that ever happens again." She said, "My instructions were for no arrests and no police force. I explicitly directed the chief of police that violence should be avoided at all costs."

=== Investigations ===
Katehi and State Assembly Speaker John A. Pérez requested an outside investigation, and Mark G. Yudof appointed former Los Angeles Police Department Chief William J. Bratton to head the investigation.

The board of the Council of UC Faculty Associations said that "police violence" was used against non-violent demonstrators throughout the state of California:

This week, we have seen excessive force used against non-violent protesters at UC Berkeley, UCLA, CSU Long Beach, and UC Davis. Student, faculty and staff protesters have been pepper-sprayed directly in the eyes and mouth, beaten and shoved by batons, dragged by the arms while handcuffed, and submitted to other forms of excessive force. Protesters have been hospitalized because of injuries inflicted during these incidents. The violence was unprovoked, disproportional and excessive.

Bratton, chairman of the Kroll Security Group, was accused by critics and the Council of UC Faculty Associations as having a potential conflict of interest. Kroll, which holds security contracts in the UC system, is a subsidiary of Altegrity Risk International and works closely with the financial sector on Wall Street.

On December 6, 2011, Rep. Jerrold Nadler of New York's 8th congressional district and ranking member of the United States House Judiciary Subcommittee on the Constitution, sent a letter to Eric Holder, the United States Attorney General, requesting that the United States Department of Justice "launch a thorough investigation into law enforcement activities surrounding Occupy Wall Street — and its national offshoots — to determine whether the police have indeed violated the civil liberties of demonstrators or members of the media." In the letter, Nadler notes that Occupy UC Davis was one of at least eight separate events recorded on video at Occupy demonstrations throughout the United States where "significant and unwarranted force in making arrests" occurred.

In Sacramento, on December 14, 2011, state legislators questioned Katehi in regard to the pepper spraying incident. Concerns were discussed about the current rules for policing protests and use of force.

The release of a report by the university's task force investigating the crackdown was delayed in March 2012, when the police officers' union filed suit to prevent its release without redacting the names of the officers involved. The Reynoso report was finally released on April 11, 2012. The report found that "Lieutenant Pike's use of force in pepper spraying seated protesters was objectively unreasonable," and that "the evidence does not provide an objective, factual basis for Lt. Pike's purported belief that he was trapped, that any of his officers were trapped, or that the safety of their arrestees was at issue."

On July 31, 2012, a UC Davis spokesman announced that Pike was no longer employed by the university.

On September 19, 2012, the Yolo County District Attorney's office, citing insufficient evidence, announced that it would not prosecute any of the police officers involved in the incident for illegal use of force. Pike responded that he was "relieved" by the decision. Pike subsequently filed a worker's compensation claim with the California Division of Workers Compensation Appeals Board for psychiatric injuries he suffered as a result of the incident. In October 2013 the Division awarded Pike $38,055 in compensation.

=== Settlement of class-action lawsuit ===
On September 26, 2012, The University of California announced its decision to offer $30,000 to each of 21 plaintiffs who were pepper sprayed by Pike, according to a proposed settlement of a class-action lawsuit. The school also offered to pay $50,000 of the students' legal fees and set aside an additional $100,000 for any future claims related to the incident, which would allow each additional claimant up to $20,000 in damages.

=== Media reactions ===
Journalist Laura Flanders described the events as a "Bull Connor Moment," an allusion to the Birmingham, Alabama sheriff who infamously deployed fire hoses and attack dogs against peaceful protestors during the American Civil Rights Movement. Viewing footage of the incident, political strategist Ron Christie described it on Hardball with Chris Matthews as "excessive force", saying, "I wouldn't call that pepper spray, I'd say that was a pepper-hose."

=== Internet meme ===
The image of Pike using his pepper spray on the occupy demonstrators became an Internet meme. Images have been manipulated to depict him pepper spraying various famous people, works of art and other objects and have received widespread coverage in media.

=== Action by Anonymous ===
The activist group Anonymous posted a statement online that, henceforth, Pike's "information [would be] public domain". The San Francisco Chronicle reported that Pike subsequently received some seventeen thousand angry or threatening emails, ten thousand text messages, and hundreds of letters, causing him to state that he suffered from depression and anxiety, which helped him achieve a worker's-compensation claim settlement of $38,056.

=== University PR response; alleged attempt to divert web searches ===
On April 13, 2016 The Sacramento Bee reported that it had obtained UC Davis documents through the California Public Records Act that showed that the university had paid at least $175,000 to public relations companies for work related to the "negative image" of the university that was circulating on the Internet. The consultancy fee was paid by the university's communications department, whose budget had increased from almost $3m in 2009, to $5.5m in 2015.

A proposal from Maryland company Nevins & Associates that was obtained by the newspaper showed that the company had been hired by the university on a six-month contract that paid $15,000 a month, starting January, 2013. The proposal prepared by Nevins & Associates offered to create an online campaign to clean up the "negative attention" on the university, and to advise the UC Davis administration in "the use of Google platforms to eliminate search results" that reflect "negatively on the university". The company stated that the overall goal was the "eradication of references to the pepper-spray incident in search results on Google search for the university and the Chancellor".

After the Nevins & Associates contract expired, the university hired in 2014 the Sacramento-based company ID Media Partners in an $82,500 contract to "design and execute a comprehensive search engine results management strategy" aimed at improving the reputation of the university and Katehi.

The use of university funds to remove negative references online was cited as one of the reasons that Katehi was removed from her post as Chancellor in April 2016 and put on administrative leave.

=== Resignation ===
On August 9, 2016, Katehi resigned her position as Chancellor of the University, but retained her position as a professor in the Department of Electrical Engineering and is allowed to have the title "chancellor emerita". She received a full year of paid sabbatical (paying her $424,360 for the year) with instruction responsibilities to start in the Fall of 2017. The resignation was a deal approved by UC President Janet Napolitano. Katehi stated that she would use her time to write "a memoir about her experiences as a woman in the electrical engineering field and as an administrative figure".
