= University of California police departments =

University of California Police Department
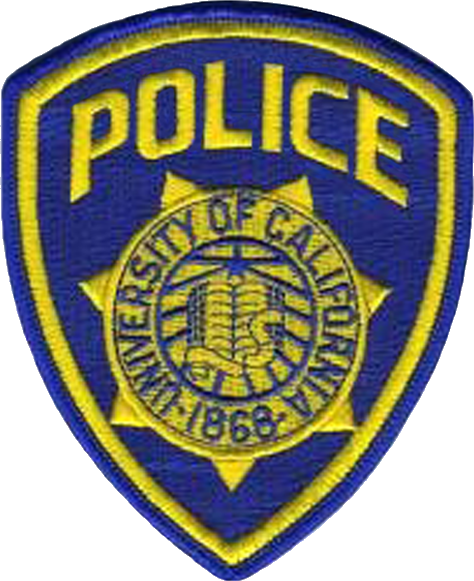

- Abbreviation: UCPD

Agency overview
- Formed: September 19, 1947 (76 years ago)

Jurisdictional structure
- Operations jurisdiction: California, USA
- Legal jurisdiction: State of California
- General nature: Civilian police

Operational structure
- Officers: 460

Facilities
- Stations: 10

The police departments of the University of California system are charged with providing law enforcement to each of the system's campuses.

== History ==
The University of California was established in 1868, and moved its first campus to Berkeley in 1873. The San Francisco and Los Angeles campuses followed in 1873 and 1919, respectively. The original UCPD department at Berkeley was founded after World War II. In September 1947, the Regents of the University of California established UCPD, as a state law-enforcement agency.

== Authority and jurisdiction ==
The UCPD is one of several police agencies in California having a statewide jurisdiction and authority (other examples include the California Highway Patrol, the California State University Police Department, and the California Department of Fish and Game). UCPD officers, like most California police officers, are empowered by section 830.2(b) of the California Penal Code, giving them authority as duly sworn peace officers throughout the state of California. As specified by Section 92600 of the California Education Code, their primary jurisdiction extends to the campuses and properties owned by the Regents of the University of California, as well as lands within a one-mile (1.6 km) radius of those campuses.

== Organization ==
Each of the ten University of California system's campuses possesses its own police department led by its own chief of police. There is no single "chief of the UCPD". One chief is selected as the departments' central coordinator. The coordinator is responsible for compiling crime statistics from each campus, as required by the Clery Act, and for ensuring that the various departments are operating within the UCPD's mission. However, each independent campus department's chain of command flows from the University of California Regents through the respective campus chancellor. The coordinator does not dictate the day-to-day operations of a department, and each department sets its own Standard Operating Policies.

Since October 1989, UCPD officers wear LAPD-style dark blue uniforms with departmental patches; their previous uniforms were California Highway Patrol-style tan. The badge is a gold seven-point star with a colored California state seal in the center, a common badge style used by various other state agencies.

Almost all of the departments have a Community Service Officer (CSO) program. CSOs are non-sworn student employees that perform various tasks for the department. Although their job description varies slightly from department to department, most utilize CSOs to perform night escorts, building checks, and general citizen assistance. Because CSOs are not sworn police officers, their main purpose is to act as additional "eyes and ears" of the department.

All of the ten departments use tasers: San Francisco, Berkeley, Los Angeles, San Diego, Santa Barbara, Irvine, Riverside, Davis, Santa Cruz, and Merced.

=== Specialized divisions ===
In addition to CSO programs, departments each have a Communications Division, which is the police dispatch center and the 9-1-1 access point for each UC campus. Each department also staffs a Detective Division to investigate crimes and other cases reported by citizens and the patrol officers.

In addition to these standard police bureaus, several departments also staff more specialized police and public safety units. These include: Emergency Medical Services (EMS), Bomb Squad, Crime Prevention Units, Special Response Teams, Crime Labs, Dignitary Protection Units, Negotiation and Entry Teams, and others.

== Individual departments ==
=== Berkeley ===
University of California Police Department
- Abbreviation: UCPD

Agency overview
- Formed: 1947
- Legal personality: Governmental: Government agency

Jurisdictional structure
- Operations jurisdiction: University of California, Berkeley, California, U.S.
- Legal jurisdiction: State of California
- Governing body: Regents of the University of California
- General nature: Civilian police
- Specialist jurisdiction: Buildings and lands occupied or explicitly controlled by the educational institution and the institution's personnel, public entering the buildings, immediate precincts

Operational structure
- Sworn members: 70
- Unsworn members: 45
- Agency executive: Yogananda Pittman, Chief of Police
- Units: 60 Community Service Officers

Website
- ucpd.berkeley.edu

The original University of California Police Department started on the Berkeley campus after the First World War. The very first security employees were three watchmen who wore full-length street carmen's coats. They each carried keys, a sidearm, and a flashlight as well as a switch to chase errant dogs from the Greek Theater stage during weekend concerts. In 1925, Captain Walter J. Lee was appointed to lead the department, which he did for the next thirty plus years. Captain Lee is given credit for the eventual growth and efficiency of the police department.

In 1947, the Regents established the University of California Police Department in its own right as a fully constituted police agency with authority based on Sections 20221 and 20222 of the State Education Code. By 1959, UC Berkeley Police consisted of about twenty-two sworn personnel.

Captain Lee was succeeded by Captain W. W. Wadman. Captain Wadman was the first university staff member in the country who was selected to attend the FBI National Academy. Campus police duties during his tenure included patrolling the campus, enforcing traffic regulations and controlling traffic, investigating reports and complaints, conducting escorts, and policing an assortment of events. Officers usually walked their beats and rarely used cars.

The only communications between dispatchers and officers in the field were staggered hourly call-ins and, at night, the use of the light on top of the Campanile, a regional landmark used to summon officers in emergencies.

In 1959, the state established the Commission on Peace Officers Standards and Training (POST) to develop minimum standards and requirements for all police officers in the state, thus leading to the development of a fully professional police force.

In the fall of 1964, the Free Speech Movement began in Berkeley, a phenomenon which spread to many other college campuses in the following years. In December 1964, the police arrested 774 people in the Sproul Hall Sit-in, the largest mass arrest undertaken in the country up to that time. After the Free Speech Movement, there were seven years of frequent, and sometimes violent demonstrations, including draft protests, strikes, bombings of the ROTC building and PG&E Towers, arsons, and street battles.

One of the most notable on-going protests has been about a piece of university property called People's Park. People's Park history is long and appears to be never ending. The University purchased the land in 1967 to build dormitories, but were prevented from building due to protests. Since that time, all efforts to develop the land have continued to be met with resistance from community activists.

On May 1, 1969, William P. Beall, the retired chief of the Berkeley Police Department, became the chief at UC Berkeley. In addition to his duties at Berkeley, Chief Beall became the first university-wide coordinator of the nine-campus police department system. Chief Beall oversaw the instituting and managing uniform system-wide policies governing recruiting, training, personnel, and performance standards. The nine campus police departments continue to work together closely. The chiefs meet every three months at one of the campuses.

Chief Beall was succeeded by Chief Derry Bowles. Chief Bowles had been the chief of the UC Police Department on the Santa Barbara campus. Chief Bowles led the department through the early 1980s, a time that included massive sit-ins and demonstrations surrounding the university's investments in South Africa.

In 1990, Victoria L. Harrison was selected as chief of police. She was the first female police chief in the UC system, and the first in Alameda County. She came to the Berkeley campus as a lieutenant, having served the first part of her career on the Santa Barbara campus. Chief Harrison served for 19 years. She led the department through extensive program changes and capital improvements. She retired as an emeritus employee and received the Berkeley Citation. On August 1, 2009, Mitchell J. Celaya was sworn in as chief. He was the first UC Berkeley chief to have started his career with UCPD as a police officer at Berkeley, and was the first Latino UC police chief. He worked many assignments as he promoted through the ranks and served as assistant chief for Chief Harrison. He retired December 30, 2012. Margo Bennett, a Captain in the department, served as the acting chief until she was appointed to the position in April 2013.

=== Davis ===
University of California, Davis Police Department
- Abbreviation: UCDPD

Agency overview
- Legal personality: Governmental: Government agency

Jurisdictional structure
- Operations jurisdiction: University of California, Davis, California, U.S.
- Legal jurisdiction: State of California
- Governing body: Regents of the University of California
- General nature: Civilian police
- Specialist jurisdiction: Buildings and lands occupied or explicitly controlled by the educational institution and the institution's personnel, public entering the buildings, immediate precincts

Operational structure
- Overseen by advisory board: UC Davis Police Accountability Board
- Police officers: 50
- Unsworn members: ~170
- University administrators responsible: Clare Shinnerl, Vice Chancellor for Finance, Operations and Administration; Gary S. May, Chancellor
- Agency executive: Joseph A. Farrow, Chief of Police
- Campuses: 2

Facilities
- Locations: 2

Notables
- Programs: Protective Service Officers; Aggie Hosts; Safe Rides; Safety Escort

Website
- police.ucdavis.edu

The University of California, Davis Police Department is located in the campus Fire and Police Building at 625 Kleiber Hall Drive.

The department is chiefly responsible for police activities on the school's campus and the medical center in Sacramento. The chief of the department is Joseph A. Farrow. The department's officers are armed. Equipment available to them includes handguns, paintball guns used to fire riot-control agents and cans of pepper spray.

The department includes a number of teams and divisions. The Support Services Division, Investigations Division, Training Division, Patrol Division, 9-1-1 Communications Center, Property and Evidence Division, Lost and Found Division, Professional Standards Division and a Security Division. All of these are based at the department's police station at Kleiber Hall Drive and Hutchison Drive.

UCPD utilizes non-sworn student employees in the Aggie Host Security Officer program. These students operate the Safe Ride transportation service, provide event security, and perform security patrols, either on vehicle or on foot.

In August 2017, the new Chief of Police, Joseph A. "Joe" Farrow, was sworn in. Farrow served as the commissioner of the California Highway Patrol from 2008 until his retirement in July 2017.

=== Irvine ===
University of California, Irvine Police Department
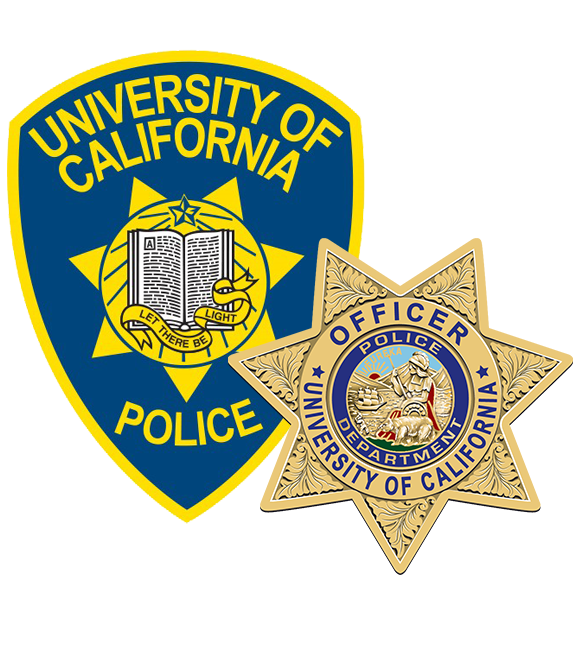
- Abbreviation: UCIPD
- Motto: Our Community, Our Commitment

Agency overview
- Formed: 1965
- Legal personality: Governmental: Government agency

Jurisdictional structure
- Operations jurisdiction: University of California, Irvine, California, U.S.
- Legal jurisdiction: State of California
- Governing body: Regents of the University of California
- General nature: Civilian police
- Specialist jurisdiction: Buildings and lands occupied or explicitly controlled by the educational institution and the institution's personnel, public entering the buildings, immediate precincts

Operational structure
- Sworn members: 42
- Unsworn members: ~180
- Agency executive: Elizabeth Griffin, Chief of Police

Facilities
- Stations: 7

Notables
- Award: IACLEA Accreditation (2024)

Website
- police.uci.edu

The University of California, Irvine Police Department is located at 410 E. Peltason, Irvine, CA.

=== IACLEA Accreditation ===
The UCI Police Department is an accredited agency. It began its accreditation review process on February 14, 2022, and achieved official accreditation in September 2024 by the International Association of Campus Law Enforcement Administrators (IACLEA). In addition to meeting all mandatory standards, the department exceeded expectations by achieving 93% of the optional standards—far surpassing IACLEA’s minimum requirements and demonstrating its commitment to professional excellence.

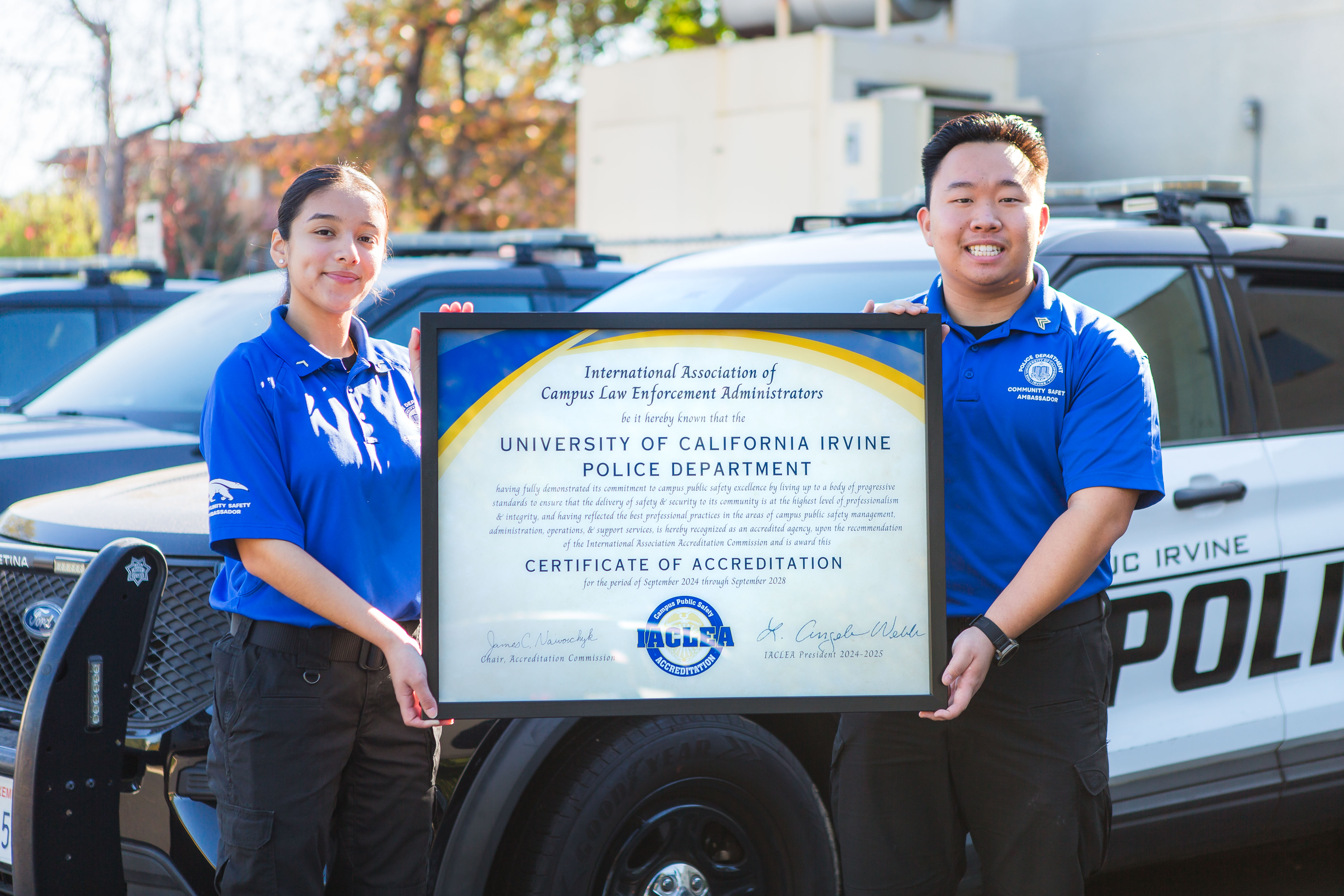
Two community safety ambassadors showcase UCIPD’s IACLEA Accreditation certificate

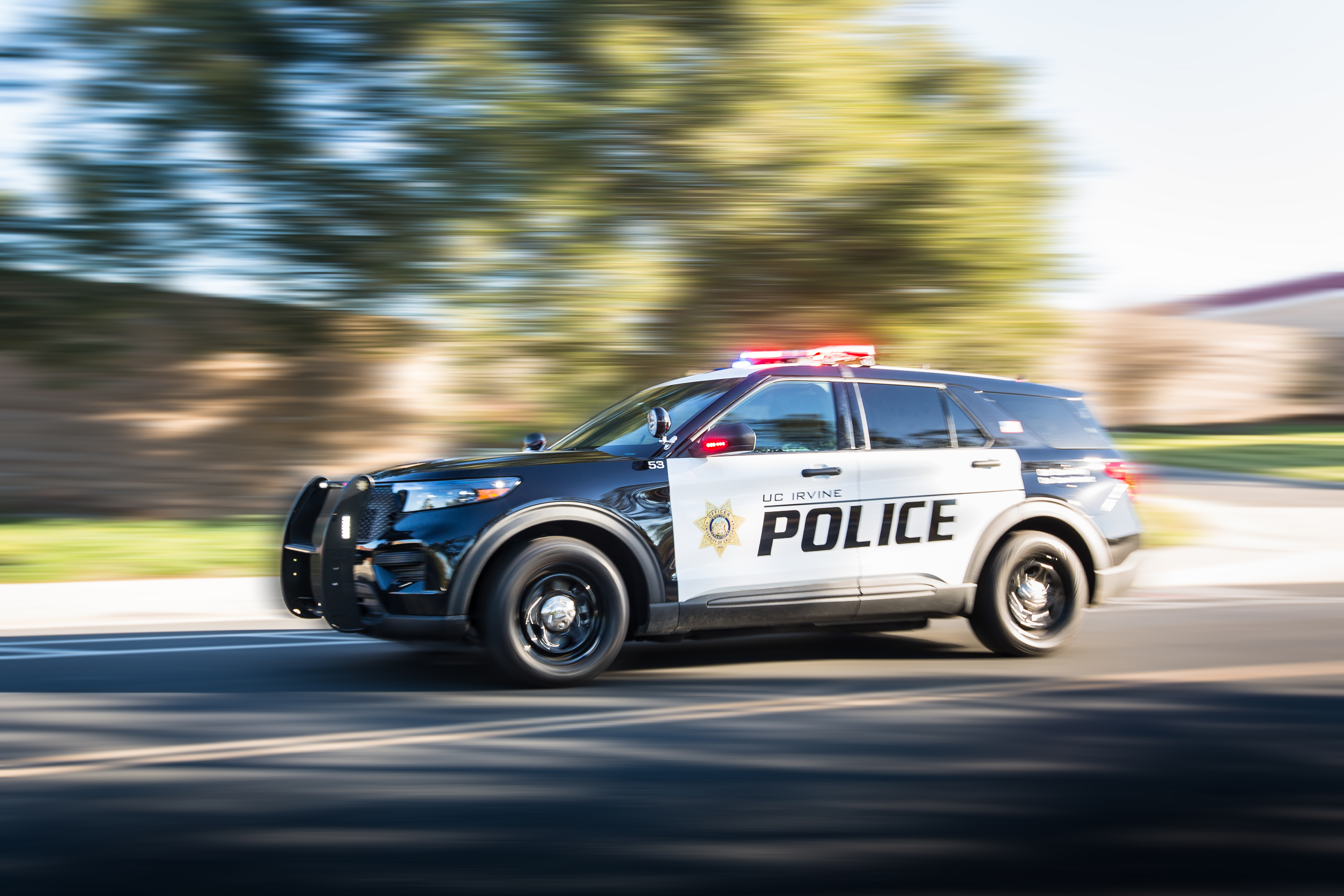
UC Irvine police car responding to a call for service

=== Los Angeles ===
University of California, Los Angeles Police Department
- Abbreviation: UCLAPD

Agency overview
- Legal personality: Governmental: Government agency

Jurisdictional structure
- Operations jurisdiction: UCLA, California, U.S.
- Legal jurisdiction: State of California
- Governing body: Regents of the University of California
- General nature: Civilian police
- Specialist jurisdiction: Buildings and lands occupied or explicitly controlled by the educational institution and the institution's personnel, public entering the buildings, immediate precincts

Operational structure
- Sworn members: 65
- Unsworn members: 46
- Agency executive: John Thomas, Chief of Police
- Units: 80 Community Service Officers; 21 Emergency medical technicians

Facilities
- Stations: 1

Website
- police.ucla.edu

The University of California, Los Angeles (UCLA) Police Department is located at 601 Westwood Plaza, Los Angeles, CA. The department moved into a modern new police station in early 2010. The department is home to both the student Community Service Officer (CSO) program as well as UCLA Emergency Medical Services (UCLA EMS). The EMS program responds to over 1700 9-1-1 medical aid calls on campus, as well as in the surrounding Westwood Village community. At least one ambulance is in service 24 hours a day, 365 days a year. All of the employees of UCLA EMS are full-time UCLA students who are EMT trained.

=== Merced ===
University of California, Merced Police Department
- Abbreviation: UCMPD

Agency overview
- Formed: 2005
- Legal personality: Governmental: Government agency

Jurisdictional structure
- Operations jurisdiction: University of California, Merced, California, U.S.
- Legal jurisdiction: State of California
- Governing body: Regents of the University of California
- General nature: Civilian police
- Specialist jurisdiction: Buildings and lands occupied or explicitly controlled by the educational institution and the institution's personnel, public entering the buildings, immediate precincts

Operational structure
- Sworn members: 15
- Agency executive: Chou Her, Chief of Police

The University of California, Merced Police Department is located at 5200 N. Lake Road, Merced, CA.

=== Riverside ===
University of California, Riverside Police Department
- Abbreviation: UCRPD

Agency overview
- Formed: 1954
- Legal personality: Governmental: Government agency

Jurisdictional structure
- Operations jurisdiction: University of California, Riverside, California, U.S.
- Legal jurisdiction: State of California
- Governing body: Regents of the University of California
- General nature: Civilian police
- Specialist jurisdiction: Buildings and lands occupied or explicitly controlled by the educational institution and the institution's personnel, public entering the buildings, immediate precincts

Operational structure
- Sworn members: 35 (including 4 UNET Officers)
- Unsworn members: 13
- Agency executive: Mike Lane, Chief of Police
- Units: 25 Community Service Officers

Facilities
- Stations: 1

The University of California, Riverside Police Department is located at 3500 Canyon Crest, Riverside, CA.

=== San Diego ===
University of California, San Diego Police Department
- Abbreviation: UCSDPD

Agency overview
- Formed: 1960
- Legal personality: Governmental: Government agency

Jurisdictional structure
- Operations jurisdiction: UC San Diego, California, U.S.
- Legal jurisdiction: State of California
- Governing body: Regents of the University of California
- General nature: Civilian police
- Specialist jurisdiction: Buildings and lands occupied or explicitly controlled by the educational institution and the institution's personnel, public entering the buildings, immediate precincts

Operational structure
- Sworn members: 50
- Unsworn members: 21 Residential Security;1 Bike;12 Dispatchers
- Agency executive: Lamine Secka, Chief of Police
- Units: 51 Community Service Officers - Students

Facilities
- Stations: 2 (Satellite Station is located in Price Center)

The University of California, San Diego (UC San Diego) Police Department is located at 9500 Gilman Drive #0017, La Jolla, CA. This is located at the intersection of Voigt Drive at Gilman Drive in the Campus Service Complex, Building B.

UC San Diego is made up of eight colleges that each have their own residence areas. The interior and exterior of these housing areas are patrolled by 20 residential security officers. Over 70 students make up the Community Service Officer Program, which provides safety escorts on campus.

Police patrol services are provided by seventeen police officers and corporals assigned to the Patrol Division. The Investigations Unit is composed of four detectives and one detective sergeant that are assigned to investigate crimes that occur on the UC San Diego campus.

=== San Francisco ===
University of California, San Francisco Police Department, San Francisco
- Abbreviation: UCSFPD

Agency overview
- Legal personality: Governmental: Government agency

Jurisdictional structure
- Operations jurisdiction: University of California, San Francisco, California, U.S.
- Legal jurisdiction: State of California
- Governing body: Regents of the University of California
- General nature: Civilian police
- Specialist jurisdiction: Buildings and lands occupied or explicitly controlled by the educational institution and the institution's personnel, public entering the buildings, immediate precincts

Operational structure
- Sworn members: 75
- Unsworn members: 250
- Agency executive: Mike Denson, Chief of Police
- Units: 1 Community Service Officers

Facilities
- Stations: 2

The University of California, San Francisco (UCSF) Police Department headquarters is located at 654 Minnesota St, Suite 180, San Francisco, CA. Police patrol services are provided 24 hours per day at all San Francisco and San Mateo County sites. All sworn officers have full police powers statewide, with primary jurisdiction on property owned, operated, or controlled by UCSF and are responsible for all related aspects of law enforcement services and criminal investigation.

UCSF police officers are responsible for the detection and suppression of all criminal activities related to the UCSF campus, and by contract, the UC College of the Law campus also in San Francisco. The UCSF Police Department is the only University of California police department to receive Commission on Accreditation of Law Enforcement Agencies (CALEA) accreditation.

The Field Services Division operates from two sub-stations located at the Parnassus and Mission Bay campuses and is responsible for uniformed patrol, traffic enforcement and investigation, response to dispatched calls for service, preliminary criminal case investigation, special event management and specialized field operations.

The Information Services Division includes the 911 Emergency Communications Center (ECC), which provides services including dispatching police, answering 911 calls originating from UCSF facilities, monitoring fire and intrusion alarms. The ECC is the focal point of all police field communication and links the University with other emergency public agencies. The ECC has 10 full-time dispatchers, certified by the state of California's Commission of Peace Officer Standards and Training. The Investigations Unit conducts investigations of major crimes. They also maintain investigative liaisons with other law enforcement agencies and develop crime analysis information to assist in effective patrol operations and to better inform the community of crime matters. IT support, property and evidence management and fleet management are also responsibilities of this division.

The Public Safety Services Division provides on-site security protection services at designated sites, manages the WeID Access Control Program, conducts security surveys and new development plan review, coordinates approval of new security devices with the Capital Projects and Facilities Management organization, manages the LiveScan fingerprinting and security clearance process, and troubleshoots security issues on behalf of the UCSF enterprise. UCSFPD Public Safety Ambassadors are unarmed non-sworn employees that act as extra eyes and ears for sworn Police Officers as well as a visible deterrent to criminal activity.

The UCSF Police Department patrols the two main UCSF campuses, but as well as over 100 different properties in San Francisco, Daly City and South San Francisco.

The department is also responsible for providing basic police services and crime prevention to UCSF Medical Center mainly through providing patrols and traffic control/parking enforcement by working directly with Medical Center Security Services, security enforcement officers, and public safety personnel.

=== Santa Barbara ===
University of California, Santa Barbara Police Department
- Abbreviation: UCSBPD

Agency overview
- Formed: 1972
- Legal personality: Governmental: Government agency

Jurisdictional structure
- Operations jurisdiction: UC Santa Barbara, California, U.S.
- Legal jurisdiction: State of California
- Governing body: Regents of the University of California
- General nature: Civilian police
- Specialist jurisdiction: Buildings and lands occupied or explicitly controlled by the educational institution and the institution's personnel, public entering the buildings, immediate precincts

Operational structure
- Sworn members: 40
- Agency executive: Dustin Olson, Chief of Police
- Units: 110 Community Service Officers

The University of California, Santa Barbara (UCSB) Police Department is located at 1201 Public Safety Building, Santa Barbara, CA.

In addition to having a CSO program, the UCSB police department operates a paramedic unit. The EMS program responds to 9-1-1 medical calls on campus, as well as in the surrounding Isla Vista community, 24 hours a day, 7 days a week, 365 days a year. The student employees are EMT trained, and the non-students are paramedic trained. In Santa Barbara County, this allows the ambulance to be considered an ALS provider. The program utilizes a type III ambulance. EMS services through the UCPD Rescue were discontinued in July, 2011 and Santa Barbara County Fire Department added an Advanced Life Support ambulance as well as additional staffing to Fire Station 17, which is attached to the police department and formerly housed both SBCo. FD personnel as well as UCSB Rescue. This new service provides the primary medical response and transport to all 9-1-1 calls on campus, and transports from Isla Vista are shared with American Medical Response, a private for-profit paramedic ambulance company which serves Goleta and the rest of Santa Barbara County. Student EMTs continue to staff alongside firefighter- paramedics on the ambulance as SBCo.FD interns.

The Problem-Solving Unit provides resources in criminal investigations, criminal intelligence, threat management, crime prevention, dignitary protection, and liaison to external agencies. This investigative unit actively participates in the Santa Barbara Regional Narcotics Enforcement Task Force (SBRNET), Santa Barbara County Arson Task Force, Joint Terrorism Task Force (JTTF), and works closely with the Joint Regional Information Center (JRIC). In addition, the Problem-Solving Unit investigates all major felonies, crimes against persons, property crimes, general crimes, and actively supports the campus threat management process.

The Isla Vista Foot Patrol (IVFP) was initiated in 1970 in the interest of developing "community based policing" for the community of Isla Vista. The UCSB Police Department works with the Santa Barbara County Sheriff's Department (SBSO) and the California Highway Patrol (CHP) to staff the IVFP. While the SBSO maintains primary jurisdiction and responsibility for Isla Vista, the UCSB Police Department and California Highway Patrol provide a supportive role. The UCSB Police Department also serves in advocating and representing the University's interests in matters related to law enforcement, safety, and security.

=== Santa Cruz ===
University of California, Santa Cruz Police Department
- Abbreviation: UCSCPD

Agency overview
- Formed: 1965
- Legal personality: Governmental: Government agency

Jurisdictional structure
- Operations jurisdiction: University of California, Santa Cruz, California, U.S.
- Legal jurisdiction: State of California
- Governing body: Regents of the University of California
- General nature: Civilian police
- Specialist jurisdiction: Buildings and lands occupied or explicitly controlled by the educational institution and the institution's personnel, public entering the buildings, immediate precincts

Operational structure
- Sworn members: 20
- Agency executive: Kevin Domby, Chief of Police

The University of California, Santa Cruz (UCSC) Police Department is located at the Emergency Response Center, 1156 High St., Santa Cruz, CA. Beginning in 2012, undergraduate students have been hired as Student Ambassadors under the university police department.

Investigations & Patrol

The UC Santa Cruz Police Department Investigations unit has the responsibility of investigating felony and misdemeanor crimes occurring on the campus. The detective of the unit works closely with allied agencies to identify criminal suspects and crime trends. The Detective is responsible for investigations of both property and persons crimes which include burglary, grand larceny, stolen property, vehicle theft, fraud/forgeries, identity theft, assaults, robberies, homicides, crimes against children, weapons violations and other types of crimes involving the campus community. The Detective is also responsible for crimes against women and sexual assaults that occur on campus, the Sex Offender Registrant Program, and works closely with the Department of Justice and the local District Attorney.

The primary function of the patrol division personnel is to provide a uniformed response to calls for service, enforce traffic laws, investigate criminal activity, provide safety presentations to the campus community, assist other divisions as needed, and to act as a visible deterrent to crime. Officers patrol the campus using marked patrol cars, bicycles and on foot.

== See also ==
- California State University Police Department
- List of law enforcement agencies in California
