= Linda Katehi =

Greek-American engineer and university administrator

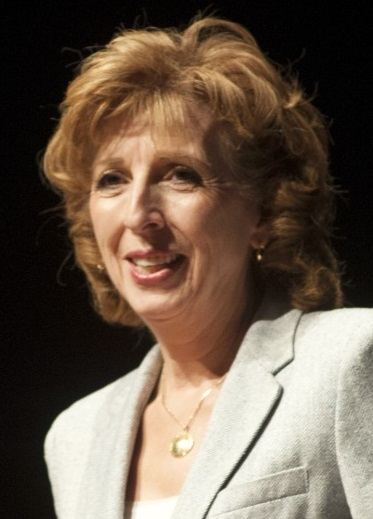
- Katehi in 2015

Sixth Chancellor at the University of California, Davis
- In office August 17, 2009 – August 9, 2016
- Preceded by: Larry N. Vanderhoef
- Succeeded by: Gary S. May

Provost and Vice Chancellor at the University of Illinois at Urbana-Champaign
- In office 2005–2009

John Edwardson Dean of Engineering Purdue University
- In office 2005–2009

Personal details
- Born: Pisti Basile Katehi; January 30, 1954 (age 72) Athens, Kingdom of Greece
- Education: National Technical University of Athens (Greece); Henry Samueli School of Engineering and Applied Science (University of California, Los Angeles)
- Profession: University Administrator, Professor of Electrical and Computer Engineering, and Women and Gender Studies
- Scientific career
- Fields: Electrical engineering
- Workplaces: National Technical University of Athens; University of Michigan, Ann Arbor; Purdue University; University of Illinois at Urbana-Champaign; University of California, Davis
- Thesis: A generalized solution to a class of printed circuit antennas (1984)
- Doctoral advisor: Nicolaos Alexopoulos

Linda Pisti Basile Katehi-Tseregounis (born January 30, 1954) is a Greek-born American engineering professor and former university administrator. Katehi was elected a member of the National Academy of Engineering (2006) for contributions to three-dimensional integrated circuits and on-wafer packaging and to engineering education. Katehi worked as the University of Illinois Urbana-Champaign's provost from 2006 to 2009 and dean of engineering at Purdue University from 2002 to 2006. Beginning in 2009, she served as the sixth chancellor of the University of California, Davis.

On April 27, 2016, University of California President Janet Napolitano removed Katehi from her post and placed her on paid administrative leave pending an investigation into possible violations of university policies over nepotism. On August 9, 2016, the UC President announced that she had accepted Katehi's resignation after the investigation found "numerous instances where Chancellor Katehi was not candid, that she exercised poor judgment, and violated multiple University policies." Katehi remained in her post as electrical engineering professor. Since fall 2019, Katehi has served as a professor in the Department of Electrical and Computer Engineering at Texas A&M University.

== Early life and education ==
Katehi was born in Athens and grew up on Salamis Island in Greece. After graduating from high school, Katehi was admitted to the National Technical University of Athens.

In 1977, Katehi graduated with a degree in electrical engineering. She was one of the two women in her class of 189 students and has stated that this led to many difficulties and biases against her during that time. She has spoken publicly about this experience: "Engineering has always been a field where not too many women go. When I was an undergrad, there were only two women in a class of 189 in electrical and mechanical engineering. Only two." Katehi has stated that this motivated her to mentor women and other underrepresented minorities pursuing careers in engineering and the sciences.

Katehi has stated that she was drawn to electrical engineering as a teenager in 1969, when she watched Neil Armstrong's Apollo 11 Moon landing. While captivated by the astronauts, she was most inspired by the engineers in mission control on Earth.

After two years working as a researcher at the Ministry of National Defense's Naval Research Lab in Athens, she was encouraged by a mentor to apply to graduate school at the University of California, Los Angeles. She came to the United States in 1979. She went on to earn her master's degree and doctorate in electrical engineering at UCLA's Henry Samueli School of Engineering and Applied Sciences in 1981 and 1984, respectively.

== Career ==
Katehi began her teaching career in Greece, as a lecturer. She taught at the National Technical University of Athens between 1977 and 1978. She then became a researcher at the Ministry of National Defence's Naval Research Lab in Athens, Greece.

In her early US career, Katehi worked at the University of Michigan, Ann Arbor from 1984 to 2001 as a professor of electrical engineering and computer science, and as associate dean of academic affairs and graduate education starting in 1994. She was hired as the engineering dean at Purdue University in 2002. While there, she increased both the faculty by 15% and research funding within the engineering department. In 2005, Katehi became the first female provost and vice-chancellor of the University of Illinois at Urbana-Champaign. After four years at the University of Illinois, Katehi became the 6th Chancellor of the University of California, Davis in 2009, succeeding Larry Vanderhoef. She was the first female chancellor of the university.

Katehi's expertise is in circuit design and her research focuses on antennas. She holds 19 patents. Through her academic roles she has been a mentor to over 70 postdoctoral fellows.

In addition to her university roles, Katehi was appointed by President George W. Bush to the committee on the National Medal of Science. She chaired the 12-member committee, along with the Secretary of Commerce's committee for the National Medal of Technology and Innovation, until 2010. She was appointed to the FBI's National Security Higher Education Advisory Board in 2010. Katehi is a fellow of the American Association for the Advancement of Science and in 2011, she was elected to the American Academy of Arts and Sciences. She is also a member of the National Academy of Engineering where she chaired the committee on K–12 engineering education for two years.

=== Current position ===
Since October 2019, Katehi has served as the O'Donnell Foundation Chair II Professor of Engineering and Distinguished Chair Professor of Electrical and Computer Engineering at Texas A&M University, College Station, Texas. She also holds appointments as Professor of Materials Science and Engineering and Professor of Intelligent Electronics. Her current research focuses on intelligent edge RF electronics, neuromorphic computing using analog memory, and the co-design of analog hardware with artificial intelligence algorithms. Funding for this work has come from BAE Systems, the State of Texas, and Texas A&M University's Targeted Proposal Teams initiative.

=== Technology transfer and entrepreneurship ===
In December 1994, while at the University of Michigan, Katehi co-founded EMAG Technologies, Inc., located in Ann Arbor, Michigan. The company was established to commercialize her research in high-frequency circuit and antenna modeling using fast multiresolution-based computational methods. Since its founding, EMAG Technologies has employed more than 100 engineers and markets EM.Cube, described as the first high-frequency circuit and antenna software with extensive design capabilities, along with NEOSCAN, a portable electro-optic, fiber-based system for non-invasive vector near-field measurements. Katehi retained an ownership interest in the company throughout her subsequent academic positions.

=== Board memberships ===
- Member of the Board of textbook publisher John Wiley & Sons
- Member of the Board of the Committee on Institutional Cooperation
- Member of the Board of The Cyprus Institute
- Member of the Board of Valley Vision
- Member of the Board of the Bay Area Council Economic Institute
- Member of the Board of the Business Higher Education Forum

== University of California, Davis ==
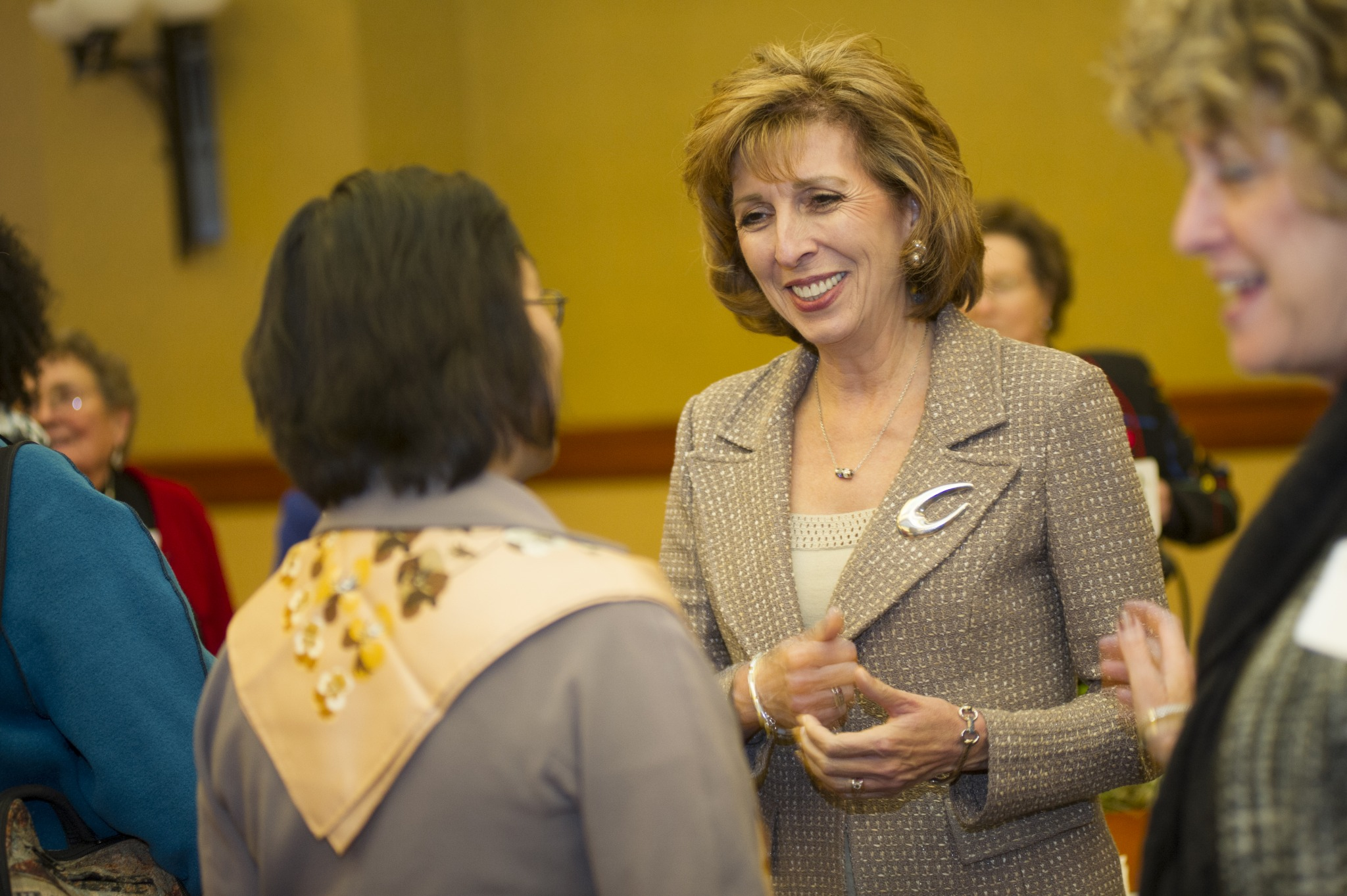
Katehi meeting with students, 2015

Katehi was appointed chancellor by the University of California Board of Regents on May 7, 2009, effective August 17, 2009. She holds UC Davis faculty appointments in electrical and computer engineering and in women and gender studies. Katehi charged a committee with creating a new "Vision of Excellence" for the school. She also launched several blue ribbon committees: tech transfer and commercialization, research, information technology excellence, and organizational excellence. Katehi also created the Chancellor's Colloquium Distinguished Speaker Series. As of 2009, Katehi's base annual salary was $400,000.

In response to demonstrations on campus in 2010, Katehi launched the Hate-Free Campus Initiative to reaffirm the campus's values and commitment to one another. The initiative included creation of "Beyond Tolerance Tuesday," collaboration with the Museum of Tolerance, and the creation of a speakers series and the Civility Project, which began with a grant from the National Endowment for the Humanities.

Under Katehi's leadership, UC Davis co-hosted the Governors' Global Climate Summit 3: Building the Green Economy in November 2010. Participants included Governor Arnold Schwarzenegger, the United Nations Development Programme, and the United Nations Environment Programme.

In 2013, Katehi launched the UC Davis World Food Center. In January 2015, she announced that UC Davis planned to build a new location for the World Food Center in downtown Sacramento, which could also serve as a satellite campus. In September 2014, Katehi announced a partnership between Mars, Incorporated and UC Davis to create the Innovation Institute for Food and Health. Mars pledged to contribute $40 million to the project over 10 years while UC Davis committed to contribute $20 million over 10 years. Additionally, Katehi announced a partnership with a government agency in Chile to expand research on a global level in conjunction with the UC Davis World Food Center.

Days after the announcement of the Mars partnership, Katehi and UC Davis announced the installation of a solar array on 70 acres of land south of Interstate 80, providing 14 percent of all UC Davis's power consumption, built in conjunction with SunPower.

Increasing the percentage of Latino students at UC Davis was stated as a goal, with UC Davis aiming to become a Hispanic Serving Institution by having at least 25% of their undergraduate student body made up of Latinos by the 2018–2019 school year.

In March 2015, Katehi invited the public to participate in the construction of the Shrem Museum in UC Davis's Gateway District by signing a steel beam to be installed and visible after construction. Upon completion, the museum houses the UC Davis art collection consisting of over 5,000 items.

== Research ==
=== Intelligent RF electronics and neuromorphic computing ===
Katehi's most recent research centers on the design and development of intelligent edge RF electronics, with emphasis on co-designing analog hardware and artificial intelligence algorithms for neuromorphic computations using analog memory. This research has produced intelligent sensors capable of spectrum classification and real-time forecasting, with applications in cognitive radio and defense communications.

Recent peer-reviewed publications from this research program include work on radio frequency signal processing using memristive systems on chip (Nature Electronics, Vol. 8, July 2025), real-time signal processing using fused neural networks on a memristor-based system-on-chip (Science Advances, Vol. 11, Issue 30, July 2025), and a cognitive radio receiver using analog in-memory processing (under review at Nature Computational Science).

In April 2025, Katehi received seed funding from Texas A&M's Targeted Proposal Teams initiative for the project "Rapid Design and Optimization of Memristors Using Digital Twin and Additive Manufacturing Technologies," undertaken with co-investigators from the Departments of Engineering and Performance, Visualization, and Fine Arts.

=== Flexible and stretchable microwave electronics ===
A 2020 paper published in Nature Communications (Vol. 11, Article 3118), co-authored by Katehi, demonstrated heterogeneously integrated flexible microwave amplifiers on cellulose nanofibril substrates — a breakthrough for biodegradable, flexible high-frequency electronics. A related 2021 paper in ACS Applied Materials & Interfaces demonstrated S-to-X-Band stretchable inductors and filters for gigahertz soft and epidermal electronics.

== Involvement in STEM ==
In August 2011, Katehi voiced her support of the California STEM Learning Network in her Huffington Post blog. The California STEM Learning Network, otherwise known as CLSNet, started in 2008 with funding provided by the S.D. Bechtel Jr. Foundation and the Bill and Melinda Gates Foundation.

In September 2012, Katehi was awarded a $3.725 million grant over 5 years from the National Science Foundation to establish an ADVANCE program at UC Davis, with the goal of increasing female participation in science, technology, engineering and mathematics (STEM) education and careers. Katehi serves as the principal investigator and chairs the project's steering committee. The grant money was used in part to create the Center for the Advancement of Multicultural Perspectives on Science (CAMPOS), whose primary focus is increasing cultural diversity and supporting Latinas in STEM careers.

In October 2012, Katehi was included on the California STEM Learning Network's list of twelve "Leading Women in STEM." The Network recognized Katehi for her work in increasing STEM opportunities for women and girls and serving as a role model in the field.

In March 2013, Katehi was chosen to speak at the 26th annual Yolo County Women's History Month luncheon. Katehi also gave a keynote address about her work in STEM at the Consortium for Women and Research's annual Distinguished Women in Science Lecture Series in April 2013.

=== Women in engineering advocacy ===
Throughout her career Katehi has been a prominent advocate for women and underrepresented minorities in engineering and STEM. She served as President of the US Women Engineering Proactive Network (WEPAN) from 2016 to 2019 and as President of the Engineering Section of the American Association for the Advancement of Science (AAAS) from 2017 to 2018.

Katehi has spoken publicly about her experience as one of two women among 189 students in her engineering class at the National Technical University of Athens, stating that this motivated her throughout her career to mentor women and underrepresented minorities pursuing careers in engineering and the sciences.

== Awards and recognition ==
For her academic work, she has received awards including the AHC Aristeio Award in Academics in 2011 and a Gabby Award for her achievements in education and academia, also in 2011.

In 2014, she received an honorary degree from the American College of Greece as part of their annual commencement ceremony.

=== Simon Ramo Founders Award ===
In 2015, the National Academy of Engineering presented Linda Katehi with its Simon Ramo Founders Award, established in 1965, recognizing her "For visionary leadership in engineering research, entrepreneurship, and education, and for national advocacy of higher education as a major driver of the U.S. economy." When Katehi received it in October 2015, she became the first woman ever to receive the award in its fifty-year history.

=== Publications record ===
Over her career Katehi has authored or co-authored more than 700 refereed publications in technical journals and symposia proceedings, as well as 10 book chapters. Her Google Scholar profile lists more than 19,700 citations.

=== Memoir ===
In 2022, Katehi published a memoir, Higher Ground (Amplify Publishing, ISBN 9781684017232), reflecting on her career in engineering and academic leadership, including her experiences as a woman in a male-dominated field and the controversies surrounding her chancellorship at UC Davis. The memoir recounts her journey from Salamis Island, Greece, to the chancellorship of one of America's top public universities, addressing themes of gender bias, leadership, mentorship, and resilience in higher education.

== Controversies ==
=== University of Illinois clout scandal ===
Before coming to UC Davis, Katehi served as provost and vice chancellor for academic affairs at the University of Illinois at Urbana-Champaign from April 1, 2006, to June 2009. As the Provost, she oversaw all Colleges and Schools, the Library, HR, IT, facilities and was in charge of the university budget. She oversaw the admissions for UIUC during part of the time period (2003–2009) that came to be investigated under the University of Illinois clout scandal. Katehi denied involvement, saying the "Category I" decisions were made at higher administrative levels. That was confirmed by the findings described in the report published by the investigative committee.

In August 2015, a federal judge allowed a spoliation of evidence claim to proceed against the University of Illinois at Urbana-Champaign in an action associated with the resignation of the Chancellor. Rather than litigating the claim, the University of Illinois settled the action at a cost of more than $2 million.

=== UC Davis pepper-spray incident ===
On November 18, 2011, Katehi requested Occupy movement protesters on the UC Davis campus to remove their tents from the quad. When the group of peaceful protesters refused to move, campus police officers pepper-sprayed them while they sat on the ground, linking arms. Eleven protesters received medical treatment; two were hospitalized.

The incident received national and international media attention. Footage captured on mobile phones circulated widely online and became a prominent symbol of the national Occupy movement. Katehi described the video images as "chilling" in a public statement. She subsequently appeared before more than 1,000 students on the campus quad to apologize publicly, saying "I am here to apologize. I feel horrible for what happened."

Katehi stated there had been "no option" except police action due to health and safety concerns, participation of some non-UC Davis persons in the protests, and some protestors' non-compliance with Katehi's earlier written and police's oral directions. The incident led to further protests and calls for Katehi's resignation from some campus departments and organizations. UC Davis Academic Senate Chair Linda Bisson criticized Katehi's slow response in providing information and taking disciplinary action against police, but said most faculty wanted Katehi to stay in her post while being held accountable in some way. An online petition asking her to resign gathered upwards of 100,000 signatures.

Katehi said she took "full responsibility for the incident" and placed two officers and the chief of campus police on administrative leave. Katehi stated that she would not step down, and she and State Assembly Speaker John A. Pérez requested an outside investigation. Mark G. Yudof appointed former Los Angeles Police Department Chief William J. Bratton to head the investigation. The Reynoso Task Force Report published in April 2012 reported that Katehi "failed to express in any meaningful way her expectation that the police operation was to be sharply limited so that no use of force would be employed by police officers other than their demand that the tents be taken down." On July 31, 2012, a UC Davis spokesman announced that John Pike, a police officer who pepper-sprayed students, was no longer employed by the university.

After the incident, UC Davis's Office of Strategic Communications budget was increased from $2.93 million in 2009 to $5.47 million in 2015. University records show the university paid at least $175,000 to a Maryland-based public relations firm to suppress online search results about the pepper spray incident. Despite this effort, searching "UC Davis pepper spray" on Google continued to return approximately 100,000 results at the time of reporting. On August 9, 2016, it was further reported that Katehi had once asked an aide to edit her Wikipedia page to protect her reputation. An independent investigation found that following the pepper-spray incident, Katehi hired a public relations firm primarily to improve her personal narrative and online identity through her Wikipedia page, for which the firm was paid $44,600.

=== EMAG Technologies — conflict of interest ===
UC records disclosed during the investigation into Katehi's chancellorship revealed that she had retained a financial interest in EMAG Technologies, the Ann Arbor company she co-founded in 1994. She reported receiving $103,000 from the firm in 2012 and $25,000 in 2013, while simultaneously serving as UC Davis Chancellor. Senior counsel for the Center for Public Interest Law described this as a potential conflict of interest for a public university administrator.

=== Conflict of interest in board memberships ===
During her tenure as chancellor of UC Davis, Katehi became embroiled in controversy over her service on outside boards of directors. In March 2016, Katehi apologized for these activities. Student activists and protesters called for her resignation by holding a protest lasting more than a month at her office. She later apologized for the DeVry board membership, calling it an error, and promised to donate $200,000 of her Wiley stock proceeds, out of the $420,000 compensation for serving on their board, to an undergraduate scholarship fund at UC Davis. Several members of the California State Assembly, unsatisfied with her response, called for her resignation, while others remained neutral.

UC President Janet Napolitano called the DeVry board membership "a mistake," but said she did not consider it a ground for Katehi's resignation at the time.

On April 1, 2016, hundreds of students walked out of classes and, with faculty, protested and called for the resignation of Katehi in a press conference. Protesters stated Katehi represented the "corporatization and privatization of the university," and that she had "failed to properly address racial and religious tensions on campus."

DeVry Education Group: Katehi faced criticism for her decision to join the board of the DeVry Education Group, a for-profit education corporation, at a time when DeVry was the subject of a federal investigation for misleading advertising practices. Katehi received $70,000 a year for her service on DeVry's board. She had not received the permission of UC president Janet Napolitano to serve on this board, as required by UC rules. Katehi resigned from the board in late February 2016.

John Wiley and Sons: Katehi also served on the board of the textbook publisher John Wiley and Sons, which has been criticized for the high cost of textbooks, and which has a direct interest in the textbook choices made by UC Davis. She received $420,000 (in pay and stock) from Wiley and Sons as compensation for her services from 2012 to 2014. She cited correcting "the chronic lack of diversity on a number of boards" as a reason to join those boards. She served on this board with permission from the University of California. In March 2016, Katehi said that she would donate all stock proceeds earned while serving on Wiley's board to a UC Davis scholarship fund.

King Abdulaziz University of Saudi Arabia: Katehi served on the board of King Abdulaziz University of Saudi Arabia.

=== Administrative leave and resignation ===
On April 27, 2016, UC President Janet Napolitano placed Chancellor Katehi on investigatory administrative leave from her position as chancellor, pending the outcome of an investigation into multiple possible violations of several University of California policies. According to Inside Higher Ed, the final straw was issues related to employing her daughter-in-law. Katehi's daughter-in-law, Emily Prieto-Tseregounis, was hired as an executive analyst at UC Davis in 2013, earning $77,000, and in less than three years was promoted to assistant vice chancellor earning $130,000.

The resignation was also covered by the Associated Press, which reported that doubts about Katehi's honesty — specifically her alleged misrepresentations to UC President Napolitano regarding her knowledge of the PR spending — were a primary factor in the decision. The ethics probe covered nepotism, misuse of student funds, and misleading administrators about her role in the social media scrubbing effort.

On August 9, 2016, the UC President announced that she had accepted Katehi's resignation after the investigation found "numerous instances where Chancellor Katehi was not candid, that she exercised poor judgment, and violated multiple University policies."

=== Resumption of academic work ===
In July 2017, the Sacramento Bee reported that Katehi would begin teaching at UC Davis again in the 2017–18 academic year as a "distinguished professor." She would receive a salary equivalent to her salary as chancellor. Public interest experts criticized the move as atypical, noting that Katehi's salary would be higher than any other professor in her department, even those with full teaching loads. UC Davis officials later revealed she would only be teaching one engineering class every academic quarter.

== Bibliography ==
=== Peer-reviewed journal articles and conference papers ===
- Gauthier, G.P., Dib, N., Katehi, L.P., and Rebeiz, G.M. "77 GHz dual-polarized microstrip antennas on thin dielectric membranes." IEEE Antennas and Propagation Society International Symposium 1997 Digest, Vol. 3, pp. 1874–1877. IEEE, 1997. doi:10.1109/APS.1997.631636
- Tentzeris, E.M., Cangellaris, A., Katehi, L.P.B., and Harvey, J. "Multiresolution time-domain (MRTD) adaptive schemes using arbitrary resolutions of wavelets." IEEE Transactions on Microwave Theory and Techniques, Vol. 50, No. 2, 2002, pp. 501–516. doi:10.1109/22.982230
- Jong-Gwan Yook and Katehi, L.P.B. "Micromachined microstrip patch antenna with controlled mutual coupling and surface waves." IEEE Transactions on Antennas and Propagation, Vol. 49, No. 9, 2001, pp. 1282–1289. doi:10.1109/8.947019
- Weller, T.M., Katehi, L.P.B., and McGrath, W.R. "Analysis and design of a novel noncontacting waveguide backshort." IEEE Transactions on Microwave Theory and Techniques, Vol. 43, No. 5, May 1995, pp. 1023–1030. doi:10.1109/22.382061
- Rieh, J.-S., Qasaimeh, O., Klotzkin, D., Yang, K., Katehi, L.P.B., Bhattacharya, P., and Croke, E.T. "Monolithically integrated SiGe/Si PIN-HBT front-end transimpedance photoreceivers." Proceedings IEEE/Cornell Conference on Advanced Concepts in High Speed Semiconductor Devices and Circuits, 1997, pp. 322–331. doi:10.1109/CORNEL.1997.649373
- Peroulis, D., Pacheco, S.P., Sarabandi, K., and Katehi, L.P.B. "Electromechanical considerations in developing low-voltage RF MEMS switches." IEEE Transactions on Microwave Theory and Techniques, Vol. 51, No. 1, January 2003, pp. 259–270. doi:10.1109/TMTT.2002.806514
- Peroulis, D., Sarabandi, K., and Katehi, L.P.B. "Design of reconfigurable slot antennas." IEEE Transactions on Antennas and Propagation, Vol. 53, No. 2, February 2005, pp. 645–654. doi:10.1109/TAP.2004.841339
- Papapolymerou, I., Franklin Drayton, R., and Katehi, L.P.B. "Micromachined patch antennas." IEEE Transactions on Antennas and Propagation, Vol. 46, No. 2, 1998, pp. 275–283. doi:10.1109/8.660973
- Nguyen, C.T.-C., Katehi, L.P.B., and Rebeiz, G.M. "Micromachined devices for wireless communications." Proceedings of the IEEE, Vol. 86, No. 8, 1998, pp. 1756–1768. doi:10.1109/5.704281
- Krumpholz, M. and Katehi, L.P.B. "MRTD: new time-domain schemes based on multiresolution analysis." IEEE Transactions on Microwave Theory and Techniques, Vol. 44, No. 4, April 1996, pp. 555–571. doi:10.1109/22.491023
- Pacheco, S.P., Katehi, L.P.B., and Nguyen, C.T.-C. "Design of low actuation voltage RF MEMS switch." 2000 IEEE MTT-S International Microwave Symposium Digest, Vol. 1, pp. 165–168. doi:10.1109/MWSYM.2000.860921
- Weller, T.M., Katehi, L.P.B., and Rebeiz, G.M. "High performance microshield line components." IEEE Transactions on Microwave Theory and Techniques, Vol. 43, No. 3, March 1995, pp. 534–543. doi:10.1109/22.372098
- Papapolymerou, J., Jui-Ching Cheng, East, J., and Katehi, L.P.B. "A micromachined high-Q X-band resonator." IEEE Microwave and Guided Wave Letters, Vol. 7, No. 6, June 1997, pp. 168–170. doi:10.1109/75.585207
- Pacheco, S., Nguyen, C.T., and Katehi, L.P.B. "Micromechanical electrostatic K-band switches." 1998 IEEE MTT-S International Microwave Symposium Digest, Vol. 3, pp. 1569–1572. doi:10.1109/MWSYM.1998.700675
- Peroulis, D., Pacheco, S., Sarabandi, K., and Katehi, L.P.B. "Tunable lumped components with applications to reconfigurable MEMS filters." 2001 IEEE MTT-S International Microwave Symposium Digest, Vol. 1, pp. 341–344. doi:10.1109/MWSYM.2001.966902
- Kormanyos, B.K., Harokopus, W., Katehi, L.P.B., and Rebeiz, G.M. "CPW-fed active slot antennas." IEEE Transactions on Microwave Theory and Techniques, Vol. 42, No. 4, April 1994, pp. 541–545. doi:10.1109/22.285057
- Robertson, S.V., Katehi, L.P.B., and Rebeiz, G.M. "Micromachined W-band filters." IEEE Transactions on Microwave Theory and Techniques, Vol. 44, No. 4, April 1996, pp. 598–606. doi:10.1109/22.491027
- Herrick, K.J., Schwarz, T.A., and Katehi, L.P.B. "Si-micromachined coplanar waveguides for use in high-frequency circuits." IEEE Transactions on Microwave Theory and Techniques, Vol. 46, No. 6, June 1998, pp. 762–768. doi:10.1109/22.681198
- Dib, N.I., Katehi, L.P.B., Ponchak, G.E., and Simons, R.N. "Theoretical and experimental characterization of coplanar waveguide discontinuities for filter applications." IEEE Transactions on Microwave Theory and Techniques, Vol. 39, No. 5, May 1991, pp. 873–882. doi:10.1109/22.79116
- Katehi, L.P.B., Harvey, J.F., and Brown, E. "MEMS and Si micromachined circuits for high-frequency applications." IEEE Transactions on Microwave Theory and Techniques, Vol. 50, No. 3, March 2002, pp. 858–866. doi:10.1109/22.989969
- Gauthier, G.P., Raskin, J.-P., Katehi, L.P.B., and Rebeiz, G.M. "A 94-GHz aperture-coupled micromachined microstrip antenna." IEEE Transactions on Antennas and Propagation, Vol. 47, No. 12, 1999, pp. 1761–1766. doi:10.1109/8.817650
- Peroulis, D., Pacheco, S.P., and Katehi, L.P.B. "RF MEMS Switches With Enhanced Power-handling Capabilities." IEEE Transactions on Microwave Theory and Techniques, Vol. 52, No. 1, January 2004, pp. 59–68. doi:10.1109/TMTT.2003.821234
- Kyoung Yang, David, G., Jong-Gwan Yook, Papapolymerou, I., Katehi, L.P.B., and Whitaker, J.F. "Electrooptic mapping and finite-element modeling of the near-field pattern of a microstrip patch antenna." IEEE Transactions on Microwave Theory and Techniques, Vol. 48, No. 2, 2000, pp. 288–294. doi:10.1109/22.821779
- Weller, T.M., Katehi, L.P.B., and Rebeiz, G.M. "Single and double folded-slot antennas on semi-infinite substrates." IEEE Transactions on Antennas and Propagation, Vol. 43, No. 12, 1995, pp. 1423–1428. doi:10.1109/8.475932
- Ponchak, G.E., Margomenos, A., and Katehi, L.P.B. "Low-loss CPW on low-resistivity Si substrates with a micromachined polyimide interface layer for RFIC interconnects." IEEE Transactions on Microwave Theory and Techniques, Vol. 49, No. 5, May 2001, pp. 866–870. doi:10.1109/22.920142
- Tentzeris, E.M., Robertson, R.L., Harvey, J.F., and Katehi, L.P.B. "Stability and dispersion analysis of Battle-Lemarie-based MRTD schemes." IEEE Transactions on Microwave Theory and Techniques, Vol. 47, No. 7, July 1999, pp. 1004–1013. doi:10.1109/22.775432
- Sabetfakhri, K. and Katehi, L.P.B. "Analysis of integrated millimeter-wave and submillimeter-wave waveguides using orthonormal wavelet expansions." IEEE Transactions on Microwave Theory and Techniques, Vol. 42, No. 12, 1994, pp. 2412–2422. doi:10.1109/22.339775
- Drayton, R.F. and Katehi, L.P.B. "Development of self-packaged high frequency circuits using micromachining techniques." IEEE Transactions on Microwave Theory and Techniques, Vol. 43, No. 9, 1995, pp. 2073–2080. doi:10.1109/22.414543
- Rosenbaum, S.E., Kormanyos, B.K., Jelloian, L.M., Matloubian, M., Brown, A.S., Larson, L.E., Nguyen, L.D., Thompson, M.A., Katehi, L.P.B., and Rebeiz, G.M. "155- and 213-GHz AlInAs/GaInAs/InP HEMT MMIC oscillators." IEEE Transactions on Microwave Theory and Techniques, Vol. 43, No. 4, April 1995, pp. 927–932. doi:10.1109/22.375256
- Yang, K., Katehi, P.B., and Whitaker, J.F. "Electric field mapping system using an optical-fiber-based electrooptic probe." IEEE Microwave and Wireless Components Letters, Vol. 11, No. 4, April 2001, pp. 164–166. doi:10.1109/7260.916331
- Herrick, K.J., Yook, J.G., and Katehi, L.P.B. "Microtechnology in the development of three-dimensional circuits." IEEE Transactions on Microwave Theory and Techniques, Vol. 46, No. 11, 1998, pp. 1832–1844. doi:10.1109/22.734496
- Yang, K., David, G., Robertson, S.V., Whitaker, J.F., and Katehi, L.P.B. "Electrooptic mapping of near-field distributions in integrated microwave circuits." IEEE Transactions on Microwave Theory and Techniques, Vol. 46, No. 12, 1998, pp. 2338–2343. doi:10.1109/22.739221
- Ponchak, G.E., Donghoon Chun, Jong-Gwan Yook, and Katehi, L.P.B. "The use of metal filled via holes for improving isolation in LTCC RF and wireless multichip packages." IEEE Transactions on Advanced Packaging, Vol. 23, No. 1, 2000, pp. 88–99. doi:10.1109/6040.826766
- Shumpert, J.D., Chappell, W.J., and Katehi, L.P.B. "Parallel-plate mode reduction in conductor-backed slots using electromagnetic bandgap substrates." IEEE Transactions on Microwave Theory and Techniques, Vol. 47, No. 11, 1999, pp. 2099–2104. doi:10.1109/22.798005
- Yumin Lu, Peroulis, D., Mohammadi, S., and Katehi, L.P.B. "A MEMS reconfigurable matching network for a class AB amplifier." IEEE Microwave and Wireless Components Letters, Vol. 13, No. 10, October 2003, pp. 437–439. doi:10.1109/LMWC.2003.818523
- Jae-Sung Rieh, Liang-Hung Lu, Katehi, L.P.B., Bhattacharya, P., Croke, E.T., Ponchak, G.E., and Alterovitz, S.A. "X- and Ku-band amplifiers based on Si/SiGe HBT's and micromachined lumped components." IEEE Transactions on Microwave Theory and Techniques, Vol. 46, No. 5, May 1998, pp. 685–694. doi:10.1109/22.668683
- Margomenos, A. and Katehi, L.P.B. "Fabrication and Accelerated Hermeticity Testing of an On-Wafer Package for RF MEMS." IEEE Transactions on Microwave Theory and Techniques, Vol. 52, No. 6, June 2004, pp. 1626–1636. doi:10.1109/TMTT.2004.828467
- Goverdhanam, K., Simons, R.N., and Katehi, L.P.B. "Coplanar stripline components for high-frequency applications." IEEE Transactions on Microwave Theory and Techniques, Vol. 45, No. 10, 1997, pp. 1725–1729. doi:10.1109/22.641719
- Dib, N.I. and Katehi, L.P.B. "Impedance calculation for the microshield line." IEEE Microwave and Guided Wave Letters, Vol. 2, No. 10, October 1992, pp. 406–408. doi:10.1109/75.160122
- Zhenqiang Ma, Mohammadi, S., Bhattacharya, P., Katehi, L.P.B., Alterovitz, S.A., and Ponchak, G.E. "A high-power and high-gain X-band Si/SiGe/Si heterojunction bipolar transistor." IEEE Transactions on Microwave Theory and Techniques, Vol. 50, No. 4, April 2002, pp. 1101–1108. doi:10.1109/22.993412
- Raskin, J.-P., Gauthier, G., Katehi, L.P., and Rebeiz, G.M. "Mode conversion at GCPW-to-microstrip-line transitions." IEEE Transactions on Microwave Theory and Techniques, Vol. 48, No. 1, 2000, pp. 158–161. doi:10.1109/22.817486
- Heng-Ju Cheng, Whitaker, J.F., Weller, T.M., and Katehi, L.P.B. "Terahertz-bandwidth characteristics of coplanar transmission lines on low permittivity substrates." IEEE Transactions on Microwave Theory and Techniques, Vol. 42, No. 12, 1994, pp. 2399–2406. doi:10.1109/22.339773
- Gong, X., Margomenos, A., Liu, B., Hajela, S., Katehi, L.P.B., and Chappell, W.J. "Precision Fabrication Techniques and Analysis on High-Q Evanescent-Mode Resonators and Filters of Different Geometries." IEEE Transactions on Microwave Theory and Techniques, Vol. 52, No. 11, November 2004, pp. 2557–2566. doi:10.1109/TMTT.2004.837162
- Harle, L. and Katehi, L.P.B. "A vertically integrated micromachined filter." IEEE Transactions on Microwave Theory and Techniques, Vol. 50, No. 9, September 2002, pp. 2063–2068. doi:10.1109/TMTT.2002.802317
- Weller, T.M., Katehi, L.P., and Rebeiz, G.M. "A 250-GHz microshield bandpass filter." IEEE Microwave and Guided Wave Letters, Vol. 5, No. 5, May 1995, pp. 153–155. doi:10.1109/75.374082
- Lu, Liang-Hung, Bhattacharya, P., Katehi, L.P.B., and Ponchak, G.E. "X-band and K-band lumped Wilkinson power dividers with a micromachined technology." 2000 IEEE MTT-S International Microwave Symposium Digest, Vol. 1, pp. 287–290. doi:10.1109/MWSYM.2000.860981
- Jui-Ching Cheng, Dib, N.I., and Katehi, L.P.B. "Theoretical modeling of cavity-backed patch antennas using a hybrid technique." IEEE Transactions on Antennas and Propagation, Vol. 43, No. 9, 1995, pp. 1003–1013. doi:10.1109/8.410218
- Robertson, S.V., Katehi, L.P.B., and Rebeiz, G.M. "Micromachined self-packaged W-band bandpass filters." Proceedings of 1995 IEEE MTT-S International Microwave Symposium, pp. 1543–1546. doi:10.1109/MWSYM.1995.406269
- Eleftheriades, G.V., Ali-Ahmad, W.Y., Katehi, L.P.B., and Rebeiz, G.M. "Millimeter-wave integrated-horn antennas. I. Theory." IEEE Transactions on Antennas and Propagation, Vol. 39, No. 11, 1991, pp. 1575–1581. doi:10.1109/8.102771
- Engel, A.G. and Katehi, L.P.B. "Low-loss monolithic transmission lines for submillimeter and terahertz frequency applications." IEEE Transactions on Microwave Theory and Techniques, Vol. 39, No. 11, 1991, pp. 1847–1854. doi:10.1109/22.97485
- Laheurte, J.-M., Katehi, L.P.B., and Rebeiz, G.M. "CPW-fed slot antennas on multilayer dielectric substrates." IEEE Transactions on Antennas and Propagation, Vol. 44, No. 8, 1996, pp. 1102–1111. doi:10.1109/8.511818
- Simons, R.N., Chun, Donghoon, and Katehi, L.P.B. "Reconfigurable array antenna using microelectromechanical systems (MEMS) actuators." IEEE Antennas and Propagation Society International Symposium 2001 Digest, Vol. 3, pp. 674–677. doi:10.1109/APS.2001.960186
- Simons, R.N., Dib, N.I., and Katehi, L.P.B. "Modeling of coplanar stripline discontinuities." IEEE Transactions on Microwave Theory and Techniques, Vol. 44, No. 5, May 1996, pp. 711–716. doi:10.1109/22.493924
- Peroulis, D. and Katehi, L.P.B. "Electrostatically-tunable analog RF MEMS varactors with measured capacitance range of 300%." IEEE MTT-S International Microwave Symposium Digest, 2003, Vol. 3, pp. 1793–1796. doi:10.1109/MWSYM.2003.1210488
- Dib, N.I., Gupta, M., Ponchak, G.E., and Katehi, L.P.B. "Characterization of asymmetric coplanar waveguide discontinuities." IEEE Transactions on Microwave Theory and Techniques, Vol. 41, No. 9, 1993, pp. 1549–1558. doi:10.1109/22.245676

=== Recent publications (2020–2025) ===
- Zhang, Huilong, Katehi, Linda P.B., Cai, Zhiyong, Gong, Shaolin, and Ma, Zhenqiang. "Heterogeneously Integrated Flexible Microwave Amplifiers on a Cellulose Nanofibril Substrate." Nature Communications, Vol. 11, Article 3118, June 2020. doi:10.1038/s41467-020-16068-y
- Lan, Yu, Zhang, Huilong, et al. and Katehi, Linda P.B. "S- to X-Band Stretchable Inductors and Filters for Gigahertz Soft and Epidermal Electronics." ACS Applied Materials & Interfaces, Vol. 13, No. 21, May 2021, pp. 25053–25063.
- He, Chaoyi, Huang, Yi, Ling, Yunzhi, Ge, Glenn, Yang, J. Joshua, Hu, Miao, and Katehi, Linda. "Radio Frequency Signal Processing via a Memristive System on Chip." Nature Electronics, Vol. 8, July 2025.
- Wang, Zixu, Song, Wenhao, Wang, Tong, et al. and Katehi, Linda. "Real-time Signal Processing using a fused network demonstrated on Memristor-based System-on-Chip." Science Advances, Vol. 11, Issue 30, July 2025.
- He, Chaoyi, Huang, Yi, Ling, Yunzhi, Ge, Glenn, Yang, J. Joshua, Hu, Miao, and Katehi, Linda. "Cognitive Radio Receiver using Analog in Memory Processing." Nature Computational Science (under review), September 2025.

=== Patents ===
- Katehi, Linda P.B., Papapolymerou, Ioannis, and Cheng, Jui-Ching. US Patent 5,821,836 A — "Miniaturized filter assembly." Filed May 23, 1997. Issued October 13, 1998. Assignee: The Regents of the University of Michigan.

=== Book chapters and conference proceedings ===
- Katehi, Linda, and Herrick, Katherine J. 29th European Microwave Conference: 5th–7th October 1999, Munich, Germany; Conference Proceedings. Microwave Engineering Europe, 1999. ISBN 9780862131524

=== Memoir ===
- Katehi, Linda P.B. Higher Ground. Amplify Publishing, 2022. ISBN 9781684017232
