= UCLA Emergency Medical Services =

Emergency Medical Services organization

- Established: 1979
- Headquarters: Los Angeles, California
- Jurisdiction: UCLA campus and surrounding area
- Employees: ~21 students 1 full-time manager
- BLS or ALS: BLS
- Ambulances: 3 (+1 electric cart)
- Responses: 1,700+/year
- Website: www.ems.ucla.edu

UCLA Emergency Medical Services (UCLA EMS) is a student-run Emergency Medical Services organization at the University of California, Los Angeles. Part of the University of California Police Department (UCPD), UCLA EMS provides 9-1-1 emergency medical response to the UCLA campus and surrounding areas 24 hours a day, 365 days a year. Each year, UCLA EMS responds to over 1,700 calls for medical aid, making it one of the busiest collegiate EMS agencies in the nation.

== History ==
In 1979, responding to an ever-growing campus and the resulting increase in demand for emergency services, UCLA created the Emergency Medical Services out of the UCLA Police Department. Originally, the ambulance was staffed by police officers who had received medical training. When a medical aid call came in, the police officers would respond back to the police station, jump in the ambulance, and respond to the scene. Beginning in the early 1980s, student employees (community service officers, or CSOs) of the police department began to staff the ambulance. Eventually, EMS would break off to become its own division at UCPD.

== Currently ==
=== EMS response ===
UCLA EMS is a primary, "first-in" Basic Life Support (BLS) emergency medical unit dispatched by the UCPD 9-1-1 Communications Center to over 1,700 medical aid calls annually in a densely populated response area that includes the UCLA campus as well as surrounding areas of Westwood. UCLA EMS operates on a tiered response system. If needed, Advanced Life Support (ALS) assistance is provided by the Los Angeles Fire Department (LAFD) (the UCLA campus falls within the first-in area of stations 37 and 71). UCLA EMS operates one primary response ambulance ("EMS-1") 24/7 - additional units (either fully staffed ambulances or response teams) are staffed during special events or emergencies on the UCLA campus.

Patients are typically transported to the Ronald Reagan UCLA Medical Center, located on campus.

=== Vehicles and equipment ===
UCLA EMS currently owns one Chevy type III ambulance from Wheeled Coach and two Type II Ford ambulances outfitted by Leader Industries in El Monte, CA. It also has an electric cart for special events, specially outfitted to accommodate a gurney and other medical equipment. EMTs are trained as EMT-D's and utilize the Zoll E-series Semi-Automatic Defibrillator for defibrillation, 3-lead EKG, Capnography (EtCO_{2}), NIBP, and pulse oximetry. The Zoll AED-Pro is used at special events due to its portable size.

=== Non-EMS duties ===
While 911 emergency medical response is their first priority, EMTs also staff the front desk of the UCLA Police Station. They assist visitors, maintain the campus central Lost & Found program, and take over 40% of the Department's police reports.

== Membership ==
Membership is open to full-time UCLA students who are certified as EMTs in California and who have a minimum of one year left in school and a 2.0 GPA. Typically, hiring occurs twice a year during the Fall and Spring academic quarters. Hiring is a competitive process involving a battery of exams which evaluate medical and campus geography knowledge, physical agility, interpersonal skills, and performance under hypothetical scenarios.

== Training ==
All hirees enter a rigorous 6-month training program designed to enhance the skills and knowledge learned in basic EMT education. The program consists of three phases. Phase I exposes new EMTs to the job via ride-alongs, and Phases II and III put the trainee on EMS-1 and provided him or her with extensive on-the-job training. Shifts are supplemented by simulation sessions, classroom lectures, and campus geography lessons to further prepare the trainee for the demands of a UCLA EMT. Passing of multiple written and simulation examinations are required to test out of training into Probationary status.

Additionally, Continuing Education (CE) lectures taught by the Medical Director or an appropriate guest are conducted on a monthly basis for all EMTs. The CE's are highly interactive and are designed to create a well-informed team of EMS personnel that have been exposed to a wide range of topics that exceed their basic training as a BLS provider.

== Special events ==
UCLA EMS is responsible for providing medical coverage to events on the UCLA campus, which frequently bring thousands or tens-of-thousands of people onto the campus. For these events, UCLA EMS will staff another ambulance in addition to the in-service response unit (EMS-1). Some events are recurring, such as UCLA home basketball games in Pauley Pavilion, Mercedes Benz Tennis Cup, Nickelodeon Kids Choice Awards, IM and other NCAA Conference sports events, and Commencement ceremonies. Notable non-recurring events include the 1984 Olympics, movie premiers, film shoots, and the Special Olympics.

== Organization ==
UCLA Emergency Medical Services is a division of the Police Community Services section of the UCLA Police Department, along with Crime Prevention and CSO Programs. UCLA EMS operates under a team management system. "Team Management" consists of the EMS Manager, Medical Director, Supervisors, Coordinators, and Team Representative - it meets monthly to discuss organizational and operational issues.

Organizational structure

- Chief of Police
- Director of Police Community Services
- Medical Director
- EMS Manager
- Training Supervisor
- Quality Improvement (QI) Supervisor
- Coordinators (Public Relations/Hiring, Maintenance Coordinator)
- Field Training Officers (FTO's)
- Trained EMTs
- Probationary EMTs
- Trainees

== Accolades ==
In February 2012, five members of UCLA EMS participated in the 19th annual NCEMSF Conference and won 1st Place in the MCI simulation, finishing sixth overall in the Skills Competition based on total points. Over 90 collegiate EMS teams from around the country were in attendance.

In February 2022, five members of UCLA EMS participated in the 29th annual NCEMSF Conference and won 1st place in the Stryker EMS Skills Classic.
