= Gary S. May =

American electrical engineer and academic (born 1964)

7th Chancellor of the University of California, Davis
- Incumbent
- Assumed office August 1, 2017
- Preceded by: Linda Katehi

Personal details
- Born: Gary Stephen May; May 17, 1964 (age 62) St. Louis, Missouri, U.S.
- Education: Georgia Institute of Technology (BS); University of California, Berkeley (MS, PhD)
- Awards: Presidential Award for Excellence in Science, Mathematics, and Engineering Mentoring (2015); AAAS Fellow (2008); IEEE Fellow (2006)
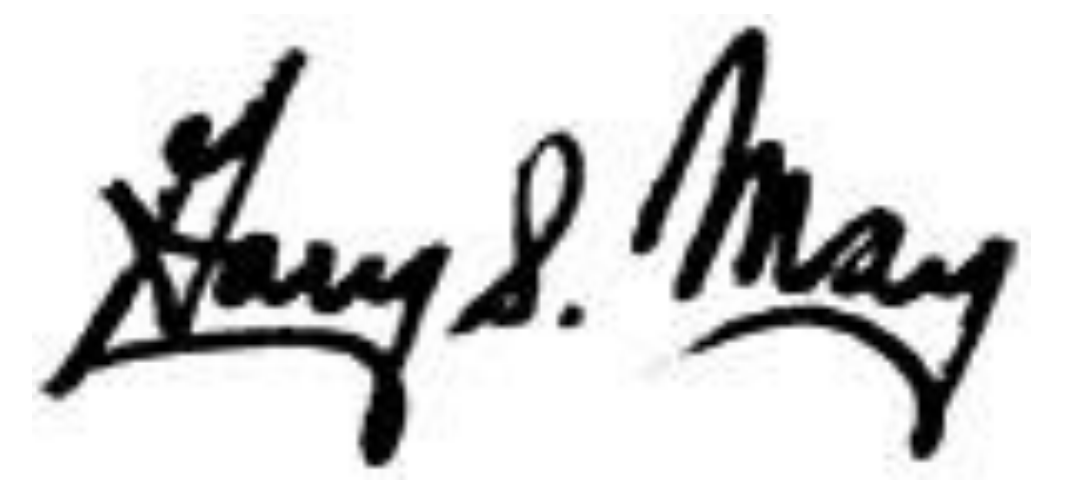
- Signature
- Scientific career
- Fields: Electrical engineering
- Workplaces: Georgia Institute of Technology; University of California, Davis
- Thesis: Automated malfunction diagnosis of integrated circuit manufacturing equipment (1991)
- Doctoral advisor: Costas Spanos

Gary Stephen May (born May 17, 1964) is an American academic and electrical engineer who is the seventh chancellor of the University of California, Davis.He is a member of the National Academy of Engineering. This recognized his work in semiconductor manufacturing research and innovations in educational programs for underrepresented groups in engineering. He is a member of the American Academy of Arts and Sciences for educational and academic leadership.

== Early life ==
May was born in St. Louis, Missouri. He attended Georgia Institute of Technology, where he was a member of the ANAK Society. May graduated in 1985 with a B.S. in electrical engineering. He attended the University of California, Berkeley, where he earned an M.S. (1987) and Ph.D. (1991), both in electrical engineering and computer science.

== Career ==
=== Georgia Tech ===
May joined the Georgia Tech ECE faculty in 1991 as a member of the School's microelectronics group. His research is in the field of computer-aided manufacturing of integrated circuits.

May is the founder of Georgia Tech's Summer Undergraduate Research in Engineering/Science (SURE) program, a summer research program designed to attract talented minority students into graduate school. He also is the founder and director of Facilitating Academic Careers in Engineering and Science program (FACES), a program designed to encourage minority engagement in engineering and science careers in academia. He is a member of the National Advisory Board of the National Society of Black Engineers (NSBE).

He was a National Science Foundation "National Young Investigator" (1993–98) and was Editor-in-Chief of IEEE Transactions on Semiconductor Manufacturing (1997–2001). He has authored over 200 articles and technical presentations on IC computer-aided manufacturing. In 2001, he was named Motorola Foundation Professor, and was appointed associate chair for Faculty Development. May was a National Science Foundation and an AT&T Bell Laboratories graduate fellow, and has worked as a member of the technical staff at AT&T Bell Laboratories in Murray Hill, New Jersey.

=== UC Davis ===
The University of California Board of Regents confirmed May as UC Davis chancellor on Feb. 23, 2017.

In 2018, May established task forces on food insecurity, housing and health care and established the Office of Diversity, Equity and Inclusion in February 2019.

Along with campus leaders and civic officials from Davis and Yolo County, He helped launch the Healthy Davis Together initiative, in November 2020 and included free saliva-based testing for COVID-19 open to the UC Davis community and residents of Yolo County. A Mathematica evaluation of the program reported that case counts were reduced by 60 percent in Davis.

Throughout his career, he has championed diversity and mentorship in higher education and the workplace, providing support to minority educational organizations and underrepresented groups. He developed nationally recognized programs to attract, mentor and retain underrepresented groups in STEM fields, May partnered with his mentor to establish the "Professor Emeritus Augustine O. Esogbue and Chancellor Gary May Endowed Award in Engineering Diversity".

Under his leadership, UC Davis has risen in national and global rankings reaching number one in the US and second in the world for Veterinary Medicine and Agriculture and Forestry, according to QS rankings in 2022. Davis ranked in the top 10 public universities in the nation according to U.S. News & World Report in 2017. Also, The Wall Street Journal/College Pulse named UC Davis #3 among public schools in their 2025 ranking of US colleges.

==== Controversy ====
May has been a member of the board of directors of Leidos, a defense contractor, since 2015. His involvement with Leidos—which frequently works with government agencies such as U.S. Immigration and Customs Enforcement, the National Security Agency, United States Border Patrol, Veterans Health Administration (VHA), and the United States Department of Homeland Security—has prompted criticism from media outlets and students in the Davis community.

Linda Katehi, May's predecessor as chancellor, resigned following a scandal over her "moonlighting" on for-profit boards.

== Personal life ==
May married LeShelle R. May, a software engineering manager at CNN. The family moved from Atlanta to Davis to allow him to become UC Davis's chancellor.

== Recognition ==
- Georgia Tech College of Engineering Hall of Fame (2024)
- Lifetime Member of the Year Award from the National Society of Black Engineers (2023)
- Education Award from the Institute of Electrical and Electronics Engineers’ Electron Devices Society for “dedicated leadership and mentorship that has diversified academic leaders in education" (2023)
- Honorary Doctorate from Georgia Institute of Technology (2021)
- American Association for the Advancement of Science, Lifetime Mentor Award (2021)
- Sacramento's Most Admired CEOs, Sacramento Business Journal (2021)
- American Society for Engineering Education, Fellow Member (2021)
- National Medical Fellowships’ Excellence in Education Award (2021)
- Named by the Sacramento Kings Foundation as a Dream All Star (2021)
- Career Services Champion Award from the National Association of Colleges and Employers (2020)
- American Academy of Arts and Sciences, Member (2020)
- 1,000 Inspiring Black Scientists in America by Cell Mentor (2020)
- Named to the Sacramento 300, the most powerful business leaders in Metro Sacramento (2019)
- National Academy of Engineering, Member (2018)
- Presidential Award for Excellence in Science, Math and Engineering Mentorship (2015)
- ECEDHA Leadership Award (2015)
- Doctor Honoris Causa of Engineering from Universidata Latina de Panama (2011)
- AAAS Fellow, (2009
- IEEE Fellow, "For contributions to education in semiconductor manufacturing and engineering." (2006)

== Notable publications ==
- May, Gary S.; Chubin, Daryl E. (January 2003). "A Retrospective on Undergraduate Engineering Success for Underrepresented Minority Students". Journal of Engineering Education. 92 (1): 27–39. doi:10.1002/j.2168-9830.2003.tb00735.x. ISSN 1069-4730.
- May, Gary S.; Spanos, Costas J. (2006-05-11). Fundamentals of Semiconductor Manufacturing and Process Control. John Wiley & Sons. ISBN 978-0-471-79027-3.
- May, G.S.; Huang, J.; Spanos, C.J. (May 1991). "Statistical experimental design in plasma etch modeling". IEEE Transactions on Semiconductor Manufacturing. 4 (2): 83–98. doi:10.1109/66.79720.
- Chubin, Daryl E.; May, Gary S.; Babco, Eleanor L. (January 2005). "Diversifying the Engineering Workforce". Journal of Engineering Education. 94 (1): 73–86. doi:10.1002/j.2168-9830.2005.tb00830.x.
- Himmel, C.D.; May, G.S. (May 1993). "Advantages of plasma etch modeling using neural networks over statistical techniques". IEEE Transactions on Semiconductor Manufacturing. 6 (2): 103–111. doi:10.1109/66.216928.
- Hong, Sang Jeen; Lim, Woo Yup; Cheong, Taesu; May, Gary S. (February 2012). "Fault Detection and Classification in Plasma Etch Equipment for Semiconductor Manufacturing $e$-Diagnostics". IEEE Transactions on Semiconductor Manufacturing. 25 (1): 83–93. doi:10.1109/TSM.2011.2175394. ISSN 0894-6507.
- Sang Jeen Hong; May, G.S.; Dong-Cheol Park (November 2003). "Neural network modeling of reactive ion etching using optical emission spectroscopy data". IEEE Transactions on Semiconductor Manufacturing. 16 (4): 598–608. Bibcode:2003ITSM...16..598H. doi:10.1109/TSM.2003.818976. ISSN 0894-6507.

== Noteworthy mentees ==
- Dean Dr. Raheem Beyah, Ph.D., Dean of The College of Engineering, Georgia Institute of Technology
- Mr. David Joshua Ferguson, MS, MRSB MRSC, Scientist and Science Educator
