= Center for Information Technology Research in the Interest of Society =

U.S. research institute

- Abbreviation: CITRIS
- Formation: July 1, 2001; 25 years ago
- Type: Governor Gray Davis Institute for Science and Innovation
- Purpose: To create technological solutions for emerging societal issues
- Headquarters: Sutardja Dai Hall, UC Berkeley campus
- Location: UC Berkeley, UC Davis, UC Merced, UC Santa Cruz
- Fields: Technology, Policy, sciences, design
- Director: Costas Spanos
- Parent organization: University of California
- Subsidiaries: CITRIS Foundry
- Staff: over 300 faculty

The Center for Information Technology Research in the Interest of Society and the Banatao Institute (CITRIS) is a research institute operated by the University of California to facilitate the real-world applications of technological research. Approved in 2000, it is part of the Governor Gray Davis Institutes for Science and Innovation, along with the California Institute for Quantitative Biosciences, California Institute for Telecommunications and Information Technology, and the California Nanosystems Institute. Headquartered at UC Berkeley, CITRIS was founded in 2001 from a desire to see innovative technologies put to practical use in improving the quality of life for people. CITRIS's partner campuses include UC Davis, UC Merced and UC Santa Cruz.

CITRIS's cross-campus collaborations include works with the UC Davis School of Medicine, the UC Berkeley School of Public Health, the UC Merced Water Research Program, and the Berkeley Center for New Media. CITRIS also addresses state and national level issues through funded research programs and active collaboration with the California Energy Commission, the California Telehealth Network, and many others.

== Research ==
CITRIS and the Banatao Institute have expanded their research to address the subcategories of Core Technology and Technology and Society.

- Sustainable Infrastructures pursue information technology research in energy, water, transportation, and the built environment as an essential foundation to creating a sustainable future. Through cyber-physical systems and the Internet of Things (IoT), information technologies can weave together these interrelated systems to promote resilience and address climate change.

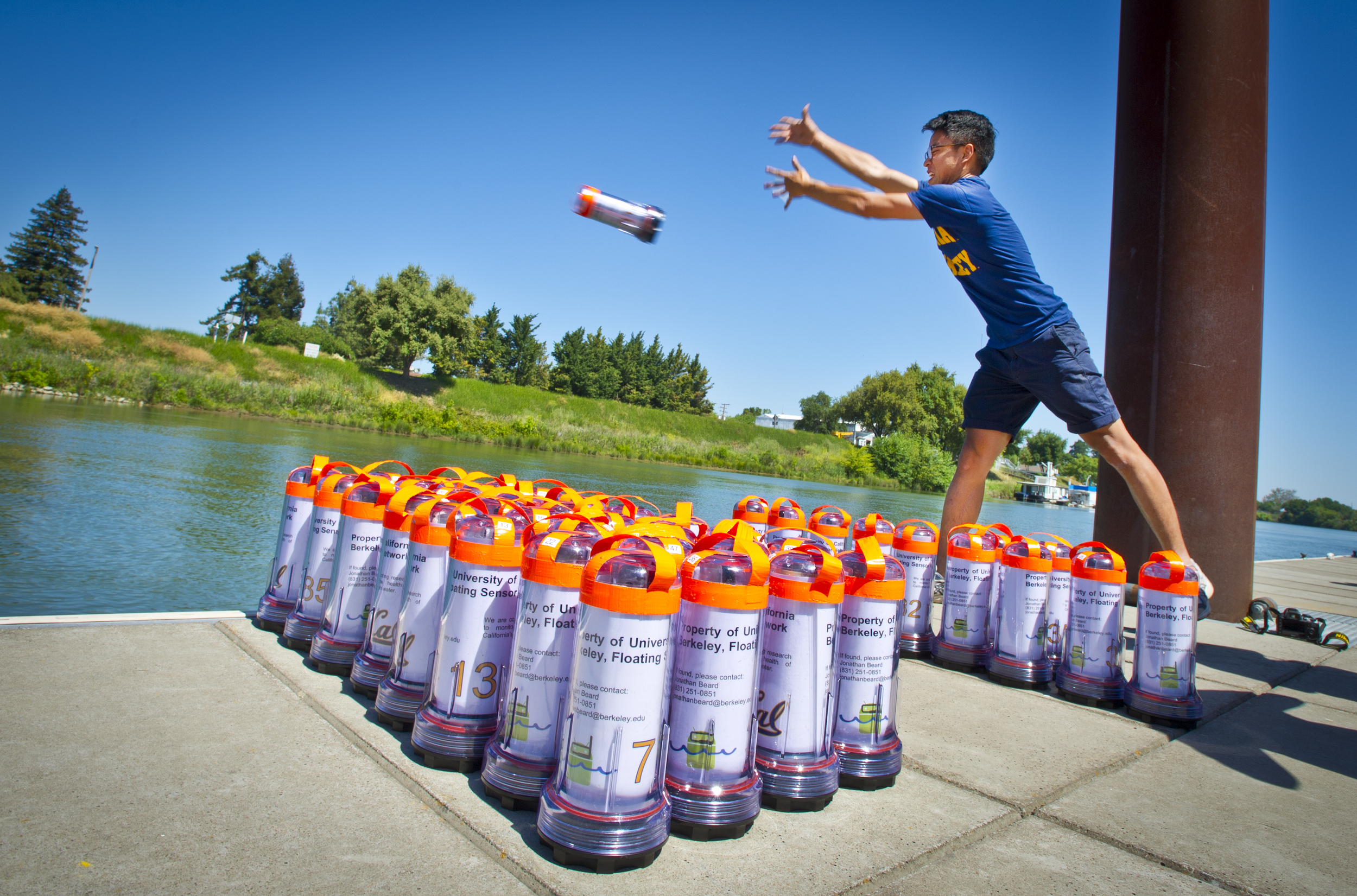
The launch of 100 floating sensors into the Sacramento River for the Floating Sensor Network project

A notable example is of the 2012 Floating Sensor Network project, which collected data to help researchers and scientists better understand how water flows from the Sacramento-San Joaqiun River Delta to pumping stations and the San Francisco Bay. It is a collaborative effort between CITRIS and UC Berkeley's Department of Civil and Environmental Engineering and Electrical Engineering.

- Health focuses on improving health outcomes and access to cost-effective care. CITRIS develops and integrates innovative technology in telehealth, sensors, analytics and mobile devices.
- People and Robots advances multi-disciplinary robotics research to improve the human experience. The thrust draws from innovations in sensors, devices, UAVs, networks, optimization, and machine learning for applications in healthcare, manufacturing, transportation, safety, and a range of other contexts that benefit society. Current research focuses on cloud robotics, deep learning, human-centric automation, and bio-inspired robotics.

== Labs and Programs ==
- The Berkeley Marvell Nanofabrication Lab located in the CITRIS headquarters building, includes more than 15,000 square feet of Class100 and Class1000 clean rooms, with a wide range of micro and nanofabrication capabilities. The Nano lab serves over 70 principal investigators and more than 450 graduate and postgraduate researchers on an annual basis. The Nano lab is first and foremost an academic research facility. However, excess equipment capacity is made available to affiliate companies if their research needs do not conflict with academic research priorities. Over the past 15 years, the Nano lab has welcomed more than 100 affiliate member companies―approximately one-quarter of them based upon UC Berkeley developed technologies or founded by UC Berkeley alumni.
- The CITRIS Invention Lab is an onsite rapid prototyping and packaging lab that works in conjunction with the Marvell Nanofabrication Lab. Resources consist of an array of traditional prototyping equipment that range from basic craft tools to machining and electronics instruments.
