= Nicolaos Alexopoulos =

Electrical engineer and academic

Nicolaos Georgiou Alexopoulos
- Born: March 30, 1942 (age 84)
- Occupations: Electrical engineer, professor, university dean

Nicolaos Georgiou Alexopoulos (born March 30, 1942) is a Greek electrical engineer, former professor and university dean, and a champion of education and research. He currently serves as the Vice President for Academic Programs and University Relations at the Broadcom Foundation, and previously was Vice President for Antennas, RF (Radio Frequency) Technologies, and University Relations at Broadcom Corporation from 2008 to 2015. In 2005, he received an honorary doctorate degree from the National Technical University of Athens "for contributions to education and research in engineering electrodynamics and for his public lectures on the 'Genesis and Destruction of the First Research University: The Museum/Library of Alexandria."

Alexopoulos is a member of the Dean's Engineering Leadership Council at the Henry Samueli School of Engineering, University of California, Irvine (UCI). He is also a member of the Corporate Advisory Board for UCI's Department of Biomedical Engineering. He was a former member of the Scientific Advisory Board for the Centre for Integrated Circuits and Systems at Nanyang Technological University in Singapore from April 2010 to March 2012.

Alexopoulos is a named inventor of 45 US patents. He is a Fellow of the Institute of Electrical and Electronics Engineers (IEEE) and was elected "for contributions to the understanding of substrate-superstrate effects on printed circuit antennas and integrated microwave circuits." He is a Member of the National Academy of Engineering, elected "For contributions to microwave circuits, antennas, and structures for low observable technologies, and for contributions in engineering education."

In September 2016, the Henry Samueli School of Engineering at the University of California, Irvine, honored Alexopoulos and his wife with the naming of the Nicolaos G. and Sue Curtis Alexopoulos Presidential Chair in Electrical Engineering and Computer Science. In 2019, the University of Michigan awarded him the College of Engineering Alumni Medal Award, "the highest accolade given by the Michigan Engineering Alumni Board."

== Education ==
Born in Athens, Greece, in 1942, Alexopoulos graduated from the 8th Gymnasium in Athens in 1959 and left Greece that year at the age of 17 aboard the Italian liner Saturnia, bound for college in the United States. He attended Eastern Michigan University in Ypsilanti, Michigan, for two years before transferring in 1961 to the University of Michigan in Ann Arbor, Michigan, where he received his Bachelor of Science degree (1965), Master's degree (1967), and PhD (1968), all in the field of electrical engineering. His PhD advisors were Chiao-Min Chu and Piergiorgio Uslenghi; his dissertation was entitled "Electromagnetic Scattering from Certain Radially Inhomogeneous Dielectrics."

Nicolaos Alexopoulos's late brother, Aristides Georgiou Alexopoulos (1940–1978), who left Greece for the United States in 1976, was Dr. Alexopoulos's inspiration for the study of electrical engineering. Without benefit of a radio, books, or manuals, Aristides enlisted his younger brother to help him assemble a receiver/transmitter to get access to music from Italian radio stations. Needing a broadband antenna, Aristides designed a spiral, rhombic-shaped wire object that he and Nicolaos mounted on a wooden pole, propped up by rocks, to the roof of the family's home. That early antenna would later become the inspiration for Nicolaos Alexopoulos's lifelong interest in electrical engineering and spiral shapes in nature.

== Career ==
Dr. Alexopoulos served as dean of the Henry Samueli School of Engineering at the University of California, Irvine, from 1997 to 2008. He was a member of the faculty at the Henry Samueli School of Engineering and Applied Science at the University of California, Los Angeles (UCLA), from 1969 to 1996, where he served as associate dean for faculty affairs (1986–1987) and chair of the Department of Electrical Engineering (1987–1992), before taking his post as dean at UCI.

In 1999, Alexopoulos procured for UCI's engineering school a $20 million gift from Broadcom Corporation co-founder Henry Samueli, "the largest donation in the school's history." In recognition of the gift, the school was named the Henry Samueli School of Engineering.

During his deanship at UCI, Dr. Alexopoulos envisioned and/or supported the creation of university and campus advancements, including:

- Establishment of the National Fuel Cell Research Center (1997)
- Creation of the Department of Chemical and Biochemical Engineering and Materials Science at UCI (1997) The department name was later shortened to Department of Chemical Engineering and Materials Science in the 2002–2003 academic year.
- Integrated Nanosystems Research Facility (1998)
- Establishing the first "named" school on the UCI campus (1999)
- Center for Pervasive Communications and Computing (2000)
- California Institute for Telecommunications and Information Technology, Calit2 (2000)
- Department of Biomedical Engineering (2002)
- Center for Engineering Science in Design (2006)
- LifeChips graduate program (2006)
- The Edwards Lifesciences Center for Advanced Cardiovascular Technology (2007)

Of significant importance to UCI's engineering school was the establishment of the California Institute for Telecommunications and Information Technology (Calit2), initiated and supported by Nicolaos Alexopoulos in 2000. California's then-Governor Gray Davis proposed a three-way partnership between California government, academia, and industry "to increase the state’s capacity for creating the new knowledge and highly skilled people that will drive entrepreneurial business growth and expand the California economy into new industries and markets." Calit2, a partnership between UC Irvine (UCI) and UC San Diego (UCSD), was established as one of four new research initiatives, which later became known as the Governor Gray Davis Institutes for Science and Innovation. With the dean of the engineering school at UCSD, Alexopoulos co-chaired the Governing Board, one of three boards governing Calit2, which included the vice chancellors for research and the deans of other schools at both campuses.

At the UCI campus, Alexopoulos commenced development of the Center for Pervasive Communications and Computing (CPCC). He noted at the CPCC inauguration ceremony in 2000 that critical goals of the school were the creation of a well-trained workforce for local companies and providing those companies with access to faculty expertise. Generous donations from industry leaders Henry Samueli (Broadcom Corporation) and Dwight Decker (Conexant) made possible the funding of faculty and graduate fellowships at UCI's engineering school. The opening of the CPCC in 2003 marked "a key milestone towards technology transfer and overall cooperation between industry, academia and state government." That same year, Dean Alexopoulos assumed a leadership role in corporate and external relations for the Irvine division of Calit2, which opened in 2004. In its first two years of operation, faculty of Calit2 received over $30 million of federal government grants and contracts.

In 2007, Alexopoulos was elected as a member into the National Academy of Engineering for contributions to microwave circuits, antennas, and structures for low observable technologies, and for contributions in engineering education.

Alexopoulos joined Broadcom Corporation (2008–2015) as Vice President for Antennas, RF Technologies and University Relations. During and since his years at Broadcom, he was awarded patents for collaborative work he did with his engineering colleagues while at the company. He also led the creation of the annual Broadcom Foundation University Research Competition for international engineering graduate students. The competition, held annually during the Broadcom Technical Conference from 2012 to 2015, brought together twelve finalists who presented and defended their research before 500 Broadcom Corporation engineer-judges. The top three students received cash prizes from Broadcom Foundation at the Technical Conference banquet. Alexopoulos would later lead the creation of graduate-level student-driven workshops at universities around the globe after joining Broadcom Foundation, where he is currently Vice President for Academic Programs and University Relations.

Dr. Alexopoulos is highly cited in computer science and engineering literature and has written hundreds of scholarly articles and publications. He received two S. A. Schelkunoff Transactions Prize Awards, previously known as the 'Best Paper' award (for journal publications), and an Honorable Mention for the R. W. P. King Award from IEEE. In 1986, Dr. Alexopoulos founded Phraxos Research & Development, Inc., a company focused on applied research projects for the US Air Force, US Army Research Office, and the defense industry in the areas of electromagnetic modeling and design, principally for microwave and millimeter wave passive components and circuits, antennas, antenna arrays, conformal antennas, frequency selective surfaces, radomes, and advanced materials. He has served as a consultant to high-tech companies and the U.S. government.

== STEM Workshops ==
In support of Broadcom Foundation's mission to "advance science, technology, engineering and math (STEM) education by funding research, recognizing scholarship and increasing opportunity", Alexopoulos was instrumental in the creation and support of STEM workshops sponsored by the foundation. With the host university rotating yearly, the student-driven workshops provided students an opportunity to expand their global awareness and emphasized the development of "collaborations among undergraduate and graduate students from participating universities" in different countries.

=== KKT Workshop ===
In 2014, Broadcom Foundation became a sponsor of the KKT Workshop, "a long-standing international collaboration" of Keio University (Japan), KAIST (South Korea), and Tsinghua University (China). Hosting of the workshop rotated each year amongst the universities, and "30 engineering students – 10 from each university – designed their own symposium program" held at the host university. Although the foundation’s sponsorship of this workshop ended in 2019, the KKT Workshop became the model for future Broadcom Foundation university workshops.

=== EMEA University Student Research Workshop ===
In 2016, Broadcom Foundation sought to re-envision the STEM university programs it sponsors by focusing on the development of collaborative, student-driven workshops. Dr. Alexopoulos was instrumental in the creation of multidisciplinary university workshops among graduate students from participating universities around the world. In 2017, he partnered with professors from Tel Aviv University (Israel), Imperial College London (U.K.), University College Dublin (Ireland), and Indian Institute of Science (Bengaluru, India) to launch the EMEA University Student Research Workshop ("EMEA Workshop"), with a focus on 'Brain Emulation.' Alexopoulos explained that "the brain is the most efficient source conducting the most complicated computations at the lowest power levels. We want to understand exactly how the brain does this to better perceive and navigate the world. The EMEA Workshop partners ultimately selected a theme of "Brain-Inspired Computing and Technologies", and the workshop later expanded to five universities with the addition of the University of Groningen (Netherlands) in 2019. Alexopoulos and the workshop professors "insisted on a cross-disciplinary group of individuals because it's a global society that can tap the wonders of advanced communications; this is the academic model of the future. We required professors to encourage students to stretch outside their comfort zones." Following the KKT Workshop model, the EMEA Workshop rotated each year to a different host university. The inaugural workshop was hosted by Tel Aviv University in 2017, Imperial College London in 2018, and Indian Institute of Science (Bengaluru), in 2019.

=== Asia Pacific University Student Research Workshop ===
In 2018, under Dr. Alexopoulos's direction, Broadcom Foundation partnered with professors from University of California, Irvine (USA), National Chiao Tung University (Taiwan), and The University of Hong Kong (China) to create the Asia Pacific University Student Research Workshop; its focus, smart manufacturing in the era of the Fourth Industrial Revolution (Industry 4.0). The inaugural workshop was hosted by University of California, Irvine, and held in Pasadena, California. Guest students and faculty from Alabama A&M University and University of Pennsylvania joined the 2019 workshop, held in Hinschu, Taiwan, and hosted by National Chiao Tung University. Twenty-two graduate students with diverse backgrounds and academic disciplines "engaged in team-driven innovation activities and discussions to tackle how society might expand the means and methods to develop SMART cities and enhance the quality and performance of urban services in energy, transportation, health and public utilities.

== Interests ==
Inspired as a child by his older brother's creation of a receiver/transmitter and antenna, Dr. Alexopoulos developed a lifelong interest in spiraling shapes. In addition to playing a significant role throughout his academic work and engineering career, spirals became a favorite focus of fascination and study in his personal endeavors as well. He visits universities, libraries, and geographic locations of spirals around the world, e.g., Newgrange in Ireland and the Shanghai Tower in Shanghai. In addition to the many technical articles and journal publications he has written on spirals, he has given lectures on spiral shapes and their history to such organizations as IEEE; U.S. National Committee for the International Union of Radio Science (USNC-URSI); University of California, Irvine; and the Computer History Museum in Mountain View, California. Examples of his lectures include "Spiraling Through Space and Time (A Journey from Prehistoric Times to Modern High-tech Applications" and "Secrets of the Antikythera Mechanism."

== Awards and honors ==
- 1985, Fellow, Institute of Electrical and Electronics Engineers
- 2007, National Academy of Engineering
- 2008, American Electronics Association Engineering the Future Lifetime Achievement Award
- 2008, Forum for Corporate Directors, Orange County, Chairman's Award
- 2016 Nicolaos G. and Sue Curtis Alexopoulos Presidential Chair in Electrical Engineering and Computer Science in The Henry Samueli School of Engineering
- 2019, University of Michigan, College of Engineering Alumni Medal Award
