= Larry N. Vanderhoef =

American biochemist and academic (1941–2015)

- Vanderhoef in 2009

Fifth Chancellor of the University of California, Davis
- In office April 1994 – June 30, 2009
- Preceded by: Theodore L. Hullar
- Succeeded by: Linda P.B. Katehi

Personal details
- Born: March 20, 1941 Perham, Minnesota, U.S.
- Died: October 15, 2015 (aged 74) Davis, California, U.S.
- Spouse: Rosalie Suzanne Slifka (m. 1963)
- Education: University of Wisconsin, Milwaukee; Purdue University
- Profession: Biochemistry
- Scientific career
- Fields: Biochemistry
- Workplaces: University of Wisconsin, Madison; University of Illinois; University of Maryland, College Park; University of California, Davis
- Thesis: The purification, characterization, and fractionation of transfer ribonucleic acid in roots of pea seedlings and a comparison of relative ribonucleic acid amounts in dividing and non-dividing cells (1969)
- Doctoral advisor: Joe Key

Larry Neil Vanderhoef (March 20, 1941 – October 15, 2015) was an American biochemist and academic. He was the 5th chancellor of University of California, Davis.

== Biography ==
Vanderhoef was born in Perham, Minnesota to Wilmar James Vanderhoef and Ida Lucille Wothe. He received his B.A. and M.S. in biology from the University of Wisconsin–Milwaukee, and a Ph.D. in plant biochemistry from Purdue University.

Vanderhoef's research interests included the general area of plant growth and development, and in the evolution of the land-grant universities. He taught classes at levels from freshman to advanced graduate study.

The Regents of the University of California named Vanderhoef the fifth chancellor of UC Davis in 1994. He served on various national commissions addressing graduate and international education, the role of a modern land-grant university, and accrediting issues.

On June 2, 2008, Vanderhoef announced his intention to resign as chancellor on June 30, 2009, ending his tenure of more than fifteen years. In Summer 2009, former University of Illinois at Urbana-Champaign Provost Linda P.B. Katehi succeeded Vanderhoef as Chancellor of UC Davis.

Vanderhoef died on October 15, 2015, from complications due to a series of ischemic strokes, the first of which occurred in November 2012.
