= Costas Spanos =

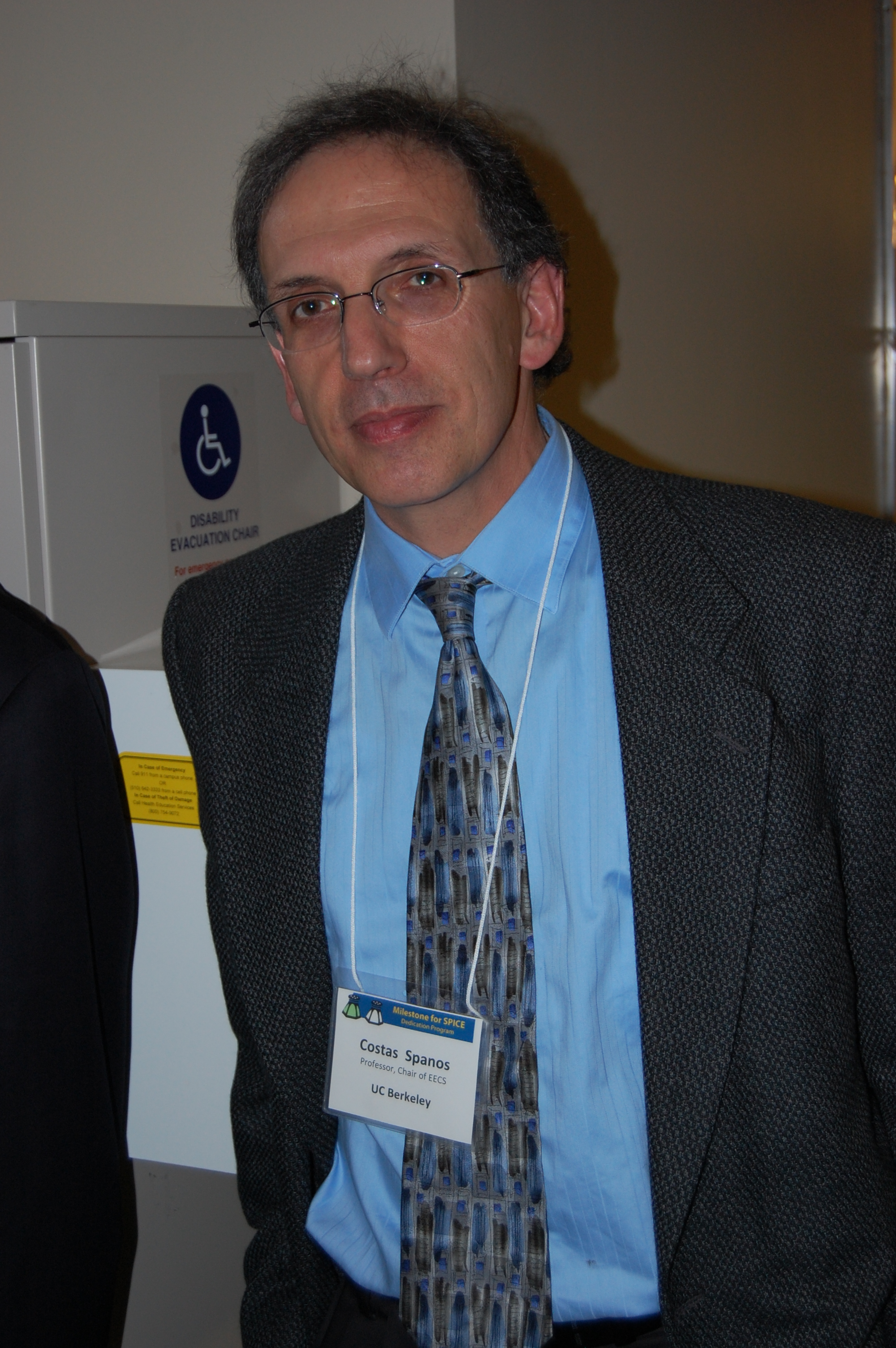
Costas J. Spanos at the IEEE SPICE Milestone plaque unveiling of UC Berkeley.

Costas J. Spanos is the Director of the Center for Information Technology Research in the Interest of Society (CITRIS) at UC Berkeley. He is also the CEO of the Berkeley Educational Alliance for Research in Singapore (BEARS) and the Andrew S. Grove Distinguished Professor of Electrical Engineering and Computer Sciences (EECS) at UC Berkeley.

== Early life and career ==
Spanos received his Electrical Engineering Diploma from the National Technical University of Athens in 1980 and his M.S. (1981) and Ph.D. (1985) degrees in Electrical and Computer Engineering from Carnegie Mellon University. From 1985 to 1988 he worked in the advanced computer-aided design group of Digital Equipment Corporation. In 1988 he became a member of the faculty in the Department of Electrical Engineering and Computer Sciences at the UC Berkeley. From 1994 to 2000 he was the Director of the Berkeley Microfabrication Laboratory. During 2004 to 2005 he acted as the Director of the Electronics Research Laboratory, while from 2004 to 2008 he was the Associate Dean for Research in the College of Engineering. He continued as the Associate Chair for the EECS Department from 2008 to 2010 and as the Chair of the Department from 2010 to 2012. His experience in AI, IoT, Data Analytics, Modeling and Machine Learning with broad applications in semiconductor technologies and cyber-physical systems led him to produce more than 300 publications and 15 patents. He is also the co-author of a textbook on semiconductor manufacturing.

== Selected publications ==
- X. Niu, N. Jakatdar, J. Bao, and C. J. Spanos, "Specular spectroscopic scatterometry," IEEE Trans. Semiconductor Manufacturing, vol. 14, no. 2, pp. 97–111, May 2001.
- M. Freed, M. Kruger, C. J. Spanos, and K. Poolla, "Autonomous on-wafer sensors for process modeling, diagnosis, and control," IEEE Trans. Semiconductor Manufacturing, vol. 14, no. 3, pp. 255–264, Aug. 2001.
- M. L. Freed, R. S. Mundt, and C. J. Spanos, "Methods and apparatus for obtaining data for process operation, optimization, monitoring, and control," U.S. Patent 6,691,068. Feb. 2004.
- M. Freed, M. V. P. Kruger, C. J. Spanos, and K. Poolla, "Wafer-grown heat flux sensor arrays for plasma etch processes," IEEE Trans. Semiconductor Manufacturing, vol. 18, no. 1, pp. 148–162, Feb. 2005.
- Q. Zhang, P. Friedberg, K. Poolla, and C. J. Spanos, "Enhanced spatial PEB uniformity through a novel bake plate design," in Proc. AEC/APC XVII Symp. 2005, Austin, TX: AEC/APC Official Proceedings CD-ROM, 2005, pp. 1–5.
- K. Poolla and C. J. Spanos, "Methods of and apparatus for controlling process profiles," U.S. Patent 7,016,754. March 2006.
- G. S. May and C. J. Spanos, Fundamentals of Semiconductor Manufacturing and Process Control, Wiley-Interscience, Hoboken, NJ: John Wiley & Sons, Inc./IEEE Press, 2006.

== Awards, Memberships and Fellowships ==
- IEEE Electron Devices Society (EDS) Fellows, 2000
- Institute of Electrical & Electronics Engineers (IEEE) Fellow, 2000
- Distinguished Berkeley Faculty Mentor Award (FMA), 2016
- Building and Environment Best Paper Award, 2018
