= Community service officer =

Crime prevention support staff in the US

A community service officer (CSO) provides support in crime prevention, investigation, and response where full police powers are unnecessary and assists police officers in upholding law and order.

== History ==
The concept has been in use in the United States since at least the 1970s. The United States Department of Justice database includes an article from 1977 entitled, COMBATING CRIME - FULL UTILIZATION OF THE POLICE OFFICER AND CSO (COMMUNITY SERVICE OFFICER) CONCEPT that described CSO functions and implementation of a CSO program. The program was not widely implemented until tight budgets collided with the public's demand for better response in emergency situations.

== Characteristics ==
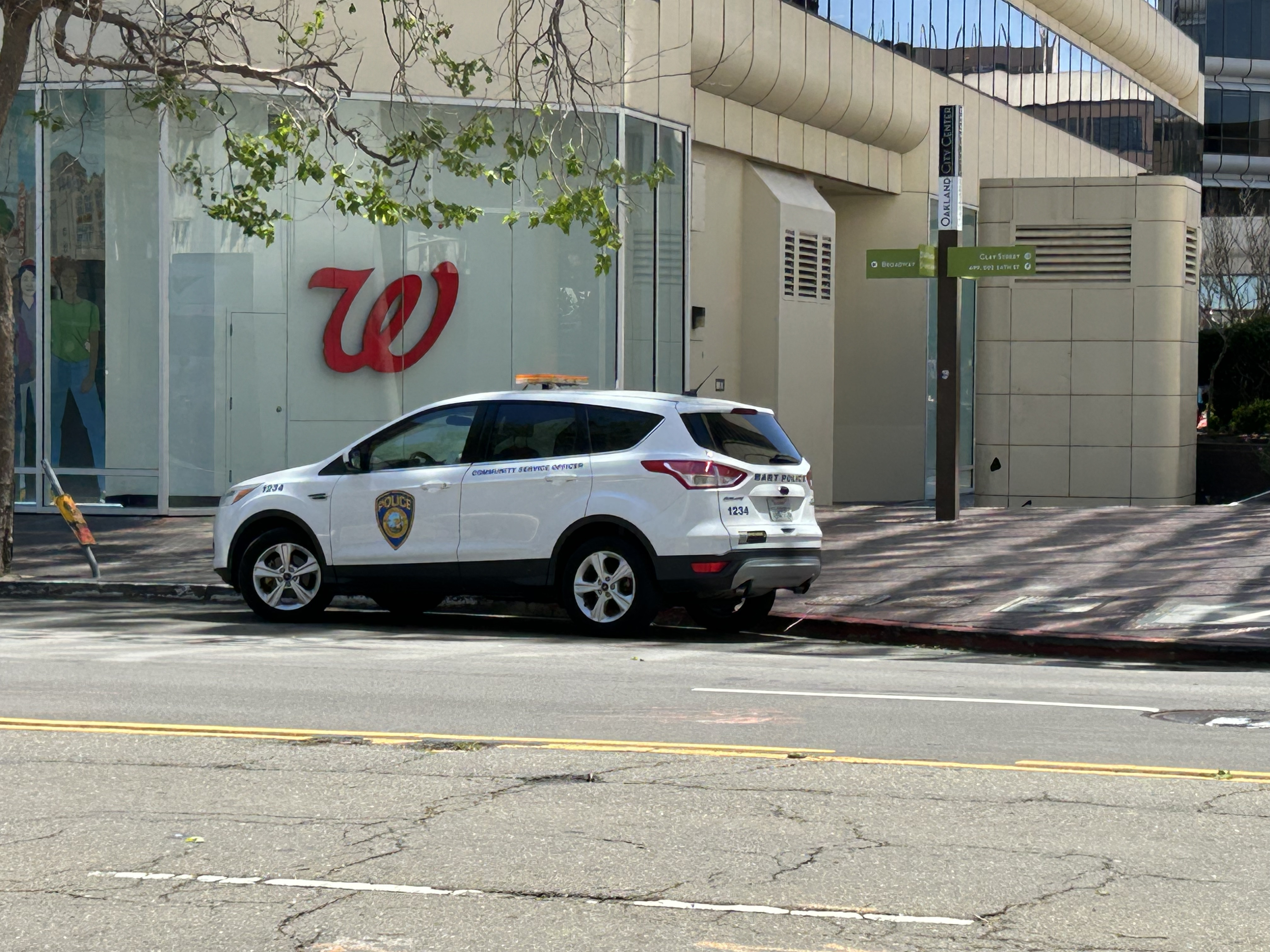
A BART Police CSO Ford Escape

Most community service officers are specially or limited commissioned peace officers and some are non-sworn (civilian) positions without powers of arrest and most do not carry firearms due to liability issues. Some CSOs are authorized to carry less-lethal weapons such as tasers, batons or pepper spray, and do receive training in self-defense tactics. Many departments authorize their CSOs to issue traffic and civil infraction citations in the course of crash investigations. At some agencies, the first year of the job is primarily clerical, with little field work. The amount of training a CSO receives will vary by state, and even by the local jurisdiction within a state.

The current climate within larger police agencies is that they are becoming increasingly constrained because of budgetary concerns and the need to serve a larger or growing community. In this environment, the position of the CSO is considered a blessing for both the departments and communities they serve in. CSOs typically are paid significantly less than sworn officers, allowing departments to field more people for the same amount of money. This has the effect of providing quicker response times to citizen requests for police services. Further, CSOs usually handle low to medium priority calls which do not require an armed police officer with arrest powers freeing sworn officers to concentrate on those incidents requiring their specific skill set. Even a few CSOs can have a significant impact on the efficiency and effectiveness of police services that departments provide.

Most departments distinguish the CSO's from normal police officers in a variety of ways, however, the two most common are uniform and vehicle. Uniforms vary by department and should be recognizable to the public as police staff, but visibly distinct from regular police officers, examples being neon Yellow (similar to the color of some traffic vests), a lighter blue color, or in some cases white. Issued vehicles for Community Service Officers often identify the individual as a CSO via decals on the vehicle. The lighting on the CSO vehicles is also different, though the color combinations vary by department. Examples include amber only lights in Jacksonville, Fl., or red/amber colors in St. Johns County, Fl., while Orlando, Fl. uses police red and clear color lights. In some cases, the color green replaced the color blue. Some CSO vehicles are equipped with a single tone siren for responding to mutual aid requests by police officers. Vehicle type is also department and locale-specific. Jacksonville uses the Chevy Malibu and Chevy Impala, Orlando uses the Ford Crown Victoria and Chevy Impala, and St. Johns County utilizes the Chevy Impala, as well as different models of Pickup and Sport Utility vehicles for the CSO's.

In Jacksonville, Florida, the CSO is regarded as an entry-level position to law enforcement for high school graduates, because the department requires police officers to be at least 21 and have a bachelor's degree, or associate degree and four years of active military or law-enforcement experience. CSOs are expected to attend college (tuition is reimbursed) and apply to the police academy within five years.

The hiring process for CSO's is similar to the process of a sworn officer being hired in most departments. CSO's must undergo oral board reviews, polygraph tests, medical and psychological exams, writing skills tests, and background investigations.

== Duties ==
- Civil regulation enforcement
- Accident Investigator
- Traffic control at vehicle collisions, public events, structure fires and traffic signal outages
- Traffic accident investigations
- Issue parking tickets
- Receives reports of and performs the initial investigation of burglaries, petty theft, found property, missing persons, vandalism and auto theft
- Provide emergency animal control
- Community Relations including crime prevention and responding to requests for information
- Dispatch
- Serves subpoenas
- Transports juveniles
- Respond to emergency vehicle breakdowns
- Assist school crossing guards
- Fingerprint services for citizens
- Vacation & Welfare Checks
- School Security
- Municipal Building Security

== See also ==
- Police community support officer, similar position in the United Kingdom
- Community policing
- Mobile Crisis Teams
