= Average Is Over =

2013 book by Tyler Cowen

Average Is Over: Powering America Beyond the Age of the Great Stagnation
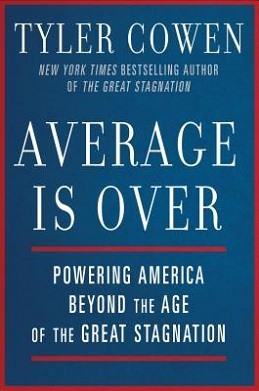
- First edition
- Author: Tyler Cowen
- Audio read by: Andrew Garman
- Language: English
- Subject: Economics
- Genre: Nonfiction
- Publisher: Dutton
- Publication date: September 12, 2013
- Publication place: United States
- Media type: Print; digital
- Pages: 304
- ISBN: 978-0-525-95373-9
- Preceded by: The Great Stagnation

Average Is Over: Powering America Beyond the Age of the Great Stagnation is a 2013 book by American economist Tyler Cowen laying out his vision for the future trajectory of the global economy. It is a sequel to Cowen's 2011 pamphlet The Great Stagnation, which argued that America had exhausted many of the low-hanging fruit (such as cheap land and easily achievable improvements in education) that had powered its growth in the 19th and early 20th century.

== Themes ==
Cowen forecasts that modern economies are delaminating into two groups: a small minority of highly educated people who are capable of working collaboratively with automated systems will become a wealthy aristocracy; the vast majority will earn little or nothing, surviving on low-priced goods created by the first group, living in shantytowns, working with highly automated production systems.

He claims that this future is foreshadowed by the recent evolution of chess from a game played by brilliant iconoclasts into freestyle chess, a team sport that relies on the creative use of advanced chess-playing software.

The author celebrates the arrival of functional online education for allowing a broader audience to keep up with rapid change at a lower price, leveraging the same sort of self-teaching that drives video game players to achievements.

Cowen sees the future role of educators as motivators rather than professors, closer to a gym membership, with (online) personal trainers. He cites Williamsburg, Brooklyn as a place full of young threshold earners, members of the second group.

In the final chapter, "A New Social Contract?," Cowen writes, "We will move from a society based on the pretense that everyone is given an okay standard of living to a society in which people are expected to fend for themselves much more than they do now."

== Reception ==
=== Interviews and discussions ===
Technology writer and critic Andrew Keen interviewed Cowen for his Keen On series for TechCrunch in September 2013.

Cowen appeared on a Financial Times podcast. Diane Coyle also participated, discussing her own book, and the authors talked about each other's publications as well. The host was Cardiff Garcia.

Cowen appeared on National Public Radio in September 2013 to discuss the book.

Cowen discussed the themes of the book in a video interview by Nia-Malika Henderson for the On Background series of The Washington Post''.

99u published some advice from Cowen for its readers that was based on insights in the book.

=== Reviews ===
The book was reviewed favorably by Philip Delves Broughton in The Wall Street Journal. Broughton noted that Cowen had not investigated high finance in his book and could have done so, but was otherwise favorably impressed by Cowen's themes.

Matthew Yglesias gave the book a mixed but largely positive review on his Slate blog, Moneybox. He writes that he expects the book "will set the intellectual agenda in much the way that its predecessor [The Great Stagnation] did" but that its "somewhat cryptic tone" requires "explication." He notes that Average Is Over apparently contradicts Cowen's previous book, The Great Stagnation – whereas that book argued (to quote Yglesias) "that the median household in rich countries had suffered stagnant living standards thanks to a slowdown in technological progress," Average Is Over argues that "the median household in rich countries will suffer stagnant living standards thanks to a speedup in technological progress." Yglesias proposes that the contradiction is resolved because "read in conjunction it's clear that in neither period was the stagnation actually caused by the pace of technological change ... scratch the surface and you'll see that Cowen actually thinks there's a policy reform agenda that, if implemented in a timely fashion, would channel much more of the gains of future automation and computerization to the median household." Yglesias then says that the policy reforms favored by Cowen constitute "in general a very solid forward-thinking 21st century egalitarian agenda." But he explains why Cowen "doubts the political system will deliver any of these solutions," and also notes that Cowen argues that "these somewhat bleak trends he forecasts aren't really all that bad if you look at them in the right light." He concludes by explaining why he disagrees with Cowen on both of these points.

Robert Heritt reviewed the book for The Daily Beast, calling it a "lively and worryingly prophetic read."

The book also received a (gated) review from Brenda Jubin on Seeking Alpha. Jubin wrote: "The future Cowen paints is pretty bleak for the majority of Americans." She concluded by writing: "This is not a future I want to see. We can only hope that, as often happens, trends are disrupted."

The Economist gave the book a mixed review, observing that Cowen's predictions about the use of technology for surveillance, rising unemployment, and demands for lower taxes were in line with current trends, but arguing that Cowen was too sanguine about the potential for inter-generational conflict or the appeal of demagogues in a democracy where the majority will become poorer.

Teresa Harnett gave it a negative review at Publishers Weekly, stating that it advances "a vision in which [humans] toil in submissive tandem with machines" which "neglects to provide evidence of how anyone's life will become better".

Other reviews include Michael Barone for the Washington Examiner and Michael Strain for the National Review.

== See also ==
- Race Against the Machine: How the Digital Revolution is Accelerating Innovation, Driving Productivity, and Irreversibly Transforming Employment and the Economy, a book by Andrew McAfee and Erik Brynjolfsson that Cowen references and claims that his book builds upon. McAfee described the relation between his books (with Brynjolfsson) and Cowen's books in a blog post on his website.
- The Singularity Is Near, a book by innovator and technology trend analyst Ray Kurzweil that Cowen references and claims to build upon. Cowen also critiques Kurzweil's claims that humans and machines will become physically integrated.
- The End of Men: And the Rise of Women, a book by Hanna Rosin.
