= Erik Brynjolfsson =

American academic

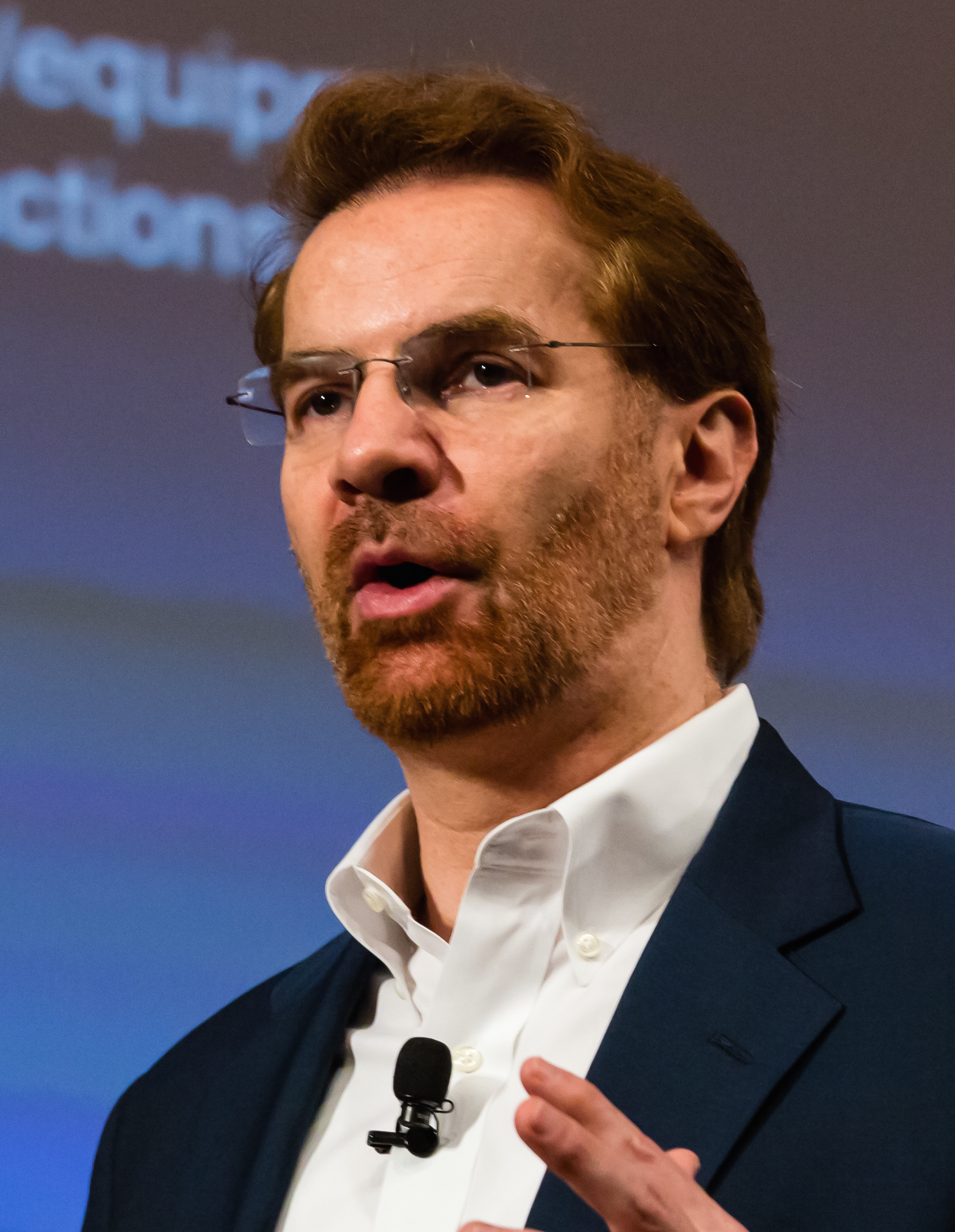
- Brynjolfsson in 2013
- Born: Roskilde, Denmark
- Citizenship: United States
- Education: Harvard University; Massachusetts Institute of Technology
- Known for: Productivity paradox The Long Tail; Bundling of Information Goods; Cyberbalkanization
- Scientific career
- Fields: Information Systems; Economics; Technological Change
- Workplaces: MIT; Stanford University
- Thesis: Information technology and the re-organization of work: theory and evidence (1991)
- Doctoral advisor: Thomas W. Malone
- Notable students: Shuman Ghosemajumder; Lorin Hitt; Yu (Jeffrey) Hu; Michael D. Smith; Marshall Van Alstyne; Xiaoquan (Michael) Zhang

Erik Brynjolfsson is an American academic, author and inventor. He is the Jerry Yang and Akiko Yamazaki Professor and a Senior Fellow at Stanford University where he directs the Digital Economy Lab at the Stanford Institute for Human-Centered AI, with appointments at SIEPR, the Stanford Department of Economics and the Stanford Graduate School of Business. He is also a research associate at the National Bureau of Economic Research and an author of several books. From 1990 to 2020, he was a professor at MIT.

Brynjolfsson contributes IT productivity research and work on the economics of information, the economics of AI, and the digital economy more generally. According to Martin Wolf, "No economist has done more to promote the revolutionary implications of information technology than MIT’s Erik Brynjolfsson."

== Biography ==
Erik Brynjolfsson was born in Roskilde, Denmark, to Marguerite Reman Brynjolfsson and Ari Brynjolfsson, a nuclear physicist. He attended Wayland High School, in Wayland, Massachusetts, where he was the valedictorian.

In 1984, he earned his A.B., magna cum laude, and his M.S. in applied mathematics and decision sciences at Harvard University. He received a Ph.D. in Managerial Economics in 1991 from the MIT Sloan School of Management.

After graduating from college, he taught courses on Building Expert Systems and on Applications of Artificial Intelligence at Harvard Extension School with Tod Loofbourrow. In 1987, he co-founded the Expert Systems subgroup of the Boston Computer Society and shortly thereafter, co-authored a series of articles on the topic.

Brynjolfsson served on the faculty of MIT from 1990 to 2020, where he was a professor at the MIT Sloan School of Management and Director of the MIT Initiative on the Digital Economy, and Director of the MIT Center for Digital Business. He also taught at Harvard from 1985 to 1995 and Stanford from 1996 to 1998.

In 2001 he was appointed the Schussel Family Professor of Management at the MIT Sloan School of Management. In February 2020, Stanford announced that Brynjolfsson would join its faculty in July, 2020. He also lectures, consults, and serves on corporate boards.

Brynjolfsson is of Icelandic descent.

=== Teaching ===
At Stanford, Brynjolfsson teaches a graduate course on "The AI Awakening: Implications for the Economy and Society" which has included guest lectures by Mira Murati, Jeff Dean, Eric Schmidt, Alexandr Wang, Mustafa Suleyman and others.

At MIT, he taught the course 15.567, The Economics of Information: Strategy, Structure, and Pricing, at MIT. He hosts a related blog, Economics of Information.

=== Public Service ===
Along with Tom Mitchell, Brynjolfsson co-chaired two committees for the National Academies of Sciences, one on "Automation and the US Workforce" in 2017 and one on "Artificial Intelligence and the Future of Work” released in 2024.

Brynjolfsson also directed the analysis of AI for the National Network for Critical Technology Assessment. He has testified about AI for the United States Congress and participated in AI Summits at the White House.

In 2016, he co-founded the AI Index and serves on its Steering Committee and was a co-author of the original (2016) report for the One Hundred Year Study of Artificial Intelligence.

=== Awards ===
His research has been recognized with nine "best paper" awards by fellow academics, including the John DC Little Award for the best paper in Marketing Science. Along with Andrew McAfee, he was awarded the top prize in the Digital Thinkers category at the Thinkers 50 Gala on November 9, 2015.

In 2011, he was elected Distinguished Fellow of the Information Systems Society.

In 2015, he received the Herb Simon Award for his work on digital economics, and in 2020 he was recognized with an Honorary Doctorate from the University of Turku for his research on the effects of information technology and AI on innovation, productivity and future work. Brynjolfsson was one of the inaugural fellows of the Schmidt Sciences AI2050 initiative.

== Research ==
Brynjolfsson is known for studying the economics of information systems and the economics of AI.

His early work measured the productivity contributions of IT and the complementary role of organizational capital and other intangibles. Along with Paul Milgrom, he wrote the lead article ("Complementarities in Organizations") in the NBER Handbook of Organizational Economics. Along with Daniel Rock and Chad Syverson, he wrote the lead article ("AI and the Modern Productivity Paradox") in the NBER volume on the Economics of Artificial Intelligence.

Brynjolfsson has done research on digital commerce, the Long Tail, bundling and pricing models, intangible assets and the effects of IT on business strategy, productivity and performance. In several of his books and articles, Brynjolfsson has argued that technology is racing ahead, and called for greater efforts to update our skills, organizations and institutions more rapidly.

=== Books ===
Brynjolfsson is the author of several books, including Wired for Innovation with Adam Saunders, and Race Against the Machine, The Second Machine Age: Work, Progress, and Prosperity in a Time of Brilliant Technologies and Machine, Platform, Crowd with Andrew McAfee.

The Second Machine Age was described as "pioneering a fundamentally new economics, one based not on the old reality of scarcity but on a new reality of abundance that we are only just beginning to comprehend."

=== Information technology and productivity ===
At the urging of Robert Solow, who first called attention to the gap between the computerization and productivity, Brynjolfsson wrote a review of the "IT Productivity Paradox".

In separate research, he documented a correlation between IT investment and productivity. His work provides evidence that the use of Information Technology is most likely to increase productivity when it is combined with complementary business processes and human capital.

A subsequent article, the Productivity J-Curve, described how these intangible investments might initially lead to stagnant or even lower productivity followed by a take-off.

=== Measuring the Digital Economy ===
Working with Avinash Collis, Felix Eggers, and others, Brynjolfsson developed new methods for measuring the digital economy using "massive online choice experiments". This work shows that even when goods like Wikipedia or email have zero price, and therefore may have little or no direct contribution to GDP as it is conventionally measured, they may still contribute significantly to well-being and consumer surplus. They introduced a new measure, GDP-B, which seeks to address these challenges by measuring the consumer surplus from these goods and assess how it changes over time.

=== Using AI to augment and extend human capabilities ===
Brynjolfsson has argued for using AI to augment and complement humans, rather than replace and substitute for them.

The key conclusion of his 2011 book Race Against the Machine was the humans should aim to work with machines as partners, rather than try to race against them. This built on his work stressing the importance of complementarities for achieving the full benefits of information technology.

In 2013, he gave a TED talk on the economic implications of AI in the opening session of TED where he argued that the key to economic growth was to use AI to augment human capabilities rather than replace them. Brynjolfsson was called a “techno optimist” after this debate, though he prefers the moniker “mindful optimist” noting that he concluded his TED talk with the words “Technology is not Destiny. We shape our Destiny.”

In 2018, he gave an Invited Talk at the International Conference on Learning Representations on “What Can Machine Learning Do? Workforce Implications” where he challenged AI researchers to create systems that augment and extend human capabilities, rather than merely imitate them.

In 2022, he wrote an article called "The Turing Trap", arguing that too often technologists, business executives and policymakers focus on using AI to automate and replace humans, which can limit the benefits of the technology and increase inequality, and that they should look for opportunities to augment human capabilities.

== Entrepreneur and Inventor ==
Brynjolfsson has been the co-founder of three companies (Foundation Technologies, Inc. Flexplay Technologies, Inc. and Workhelix, Inc) and has been awarded several U.S. patents. He also served on the Boards of Directors of two publicly traded companies, Computer Science Corporation (2010–2015) and CSK Holdings, Inc. (2005–2008).

Brynjolfsson designed the game software Dragonfire II. As an inventor, he's been awarded patents for forecasting of skills and tasks, as well as optical storage media.

=== Workhelix ===
Brynjolfsson co-founded Workhelix, Inc, a firm that helps companies assess their opportunities for using generative AI and other technologies. It applies the “task-based approach”, a methodology building on work by Brynjolfsson, Tom M. Mitchell and Daniel Rock for analyzing various technologies’ ability to augment or automate individual tasks.

=== Inclusive Innovation Challenge ===
Brynjolfsson was the co-founder of the MIT Inclusive Innovation Challenge (IIC), a global tournament designed to encourage entrepreneurs to use technology to create a more equitable future. IIC winners have collectively generated over $170 million in revenue, raised over $1 billion in capital, created more than 7,000 jobs, and served 350 million people.

== Books ==
- Brynjolfsson, E., & Saunders, A. (2010). Wired for Innovation. How Information technology in reshaping the economy. Massachusetts Institute of Technology. USA.
- Brynjolfsson, E., & McAfee, A. (2011). Race against the machine: How the digital revolution is accelerating innovation, driving productivity, and irreversibly transforming employment and the economy. Brynjolfsson and McAfee.
- Brynjolfsson, Erik and McAfee, Andrew (January, 2014) The Second Machine Age: Work, Progress and Prosperity in a Time of Brilliant Technologies, W.W. Norton & Company, ISBN 978-0-393-23935-5
- McAfee, A., & Brynjolfsson, E. (2017). Machine, Platform, Crowd: Harnessing our digital future. WW Norton & Company.

== Selected publications ==
- Brynjolfsson Erik and Mitchell, Tom (December, 2017) What can machine learning do? Workforce implications Science.
- Brynjolfsson Erik, Syverson, Chad and Rock Daniel (2019) Artificial Intelligence and the Modern Productivity Paradox: A Clash of Expectations and Statistics National Bureau of Economic Research.
- * Bresnahan, Timothy, Brynjolfsson, Erik and Hitt, Lorin (February, 2002) "Information Technology, Workplace Organization and the Demand for Skilled Labor: Firm Level Evidence" 'Quarterly Journal of Economics'', Vol. 117, pp. 339–376.
- * Bakos, Yannis and Brynjolfsson, Erik (December, 1999) "Bundling Information Goods: Pricing, Profits and Efficiency", Management Science,' Vol. 45, No. 12, pp. 1613–1630.
