= Technology Policy Institute =

Independent think tank

- Formation: 2010
- Type: Policy think tank
- Tax ID no.: 20-5835776
- Legal status: Non-profit organization
- Purpose: Research and development
- Location: Washington, D.C.
- President & Senior Fellow: Scott Wallsten
- Affiliations: Independent
- Website: techpolicyinstitute.org

The Technology Policy Institute is an independent think tank in Washington, DC dedicated to the study of technology policy. Established in 2010, its mission is "to advance knowledge and inform policymakers by producing independent, rigorous research and by sponsoring educational programs and conferences on major issues affecting information technology and communications policy." As of 2019, the University of Pennsylvania ranked Technology Policy Institute among most authoritative science and technology policy think tanks in the world.

== Overview ==
The Technology Policy Institute conducts research and publishes peer-reviewed papers, issues policy briefs, delivers congressional testimony, publishes commentary, hosts events and produces a podcast on a variety of topics related to technology policy. The institute's research has been cited in The Atlantic, Reuters, The Hill and others.

=== Screen time ===
In 2013, Scott Wallsten of the Technology Policy Institute published a study that researched screen time, specifically attempting to quantify how much less time people spend working, sleeping, and socializing at the expense of increased screen time. The study's scope was limited to "online leisure" activity (i.e. non-working screen time) and found that increased time online did equate to less time spent sleeping, studying, and socializing, among other activities.

=== Big Tech ===
In 2021, the institute described how new legislation and increased regulation for social media companies at the state level would potentially lead to increased cost of compliance and reduce overall competition.

== Annual conference ==
Since 2010, Technology Policy Institute has hosted the Aspen Forum, an annual conference in Aspen, Colorado focused on technology policy and regulation.

== Research areas ==
- Antitrust and Competition law
- Big data
- Blockchain
- Broadband
- Economics of digitization
- Evidence-based policy
- Information privacy and security
- Intellectual property, copyright, music licensing, and patents
- Net neutrality

== Board members ==
As of 2022, the website of the Technology Policy Institute listed 10 board members.

=== Board of directors ===
- Brian Tramont
- Scott Wallsten
- Thomas M. Lenard
- Madura Wijewardena
- Laura Martin

=== Board of Academic Advisors ===
- Shane Greenstein
- Thomas Hazlett
- Roger Noll
- Gregory Rosston
- Catherine Tucker
