= The Abundant University =

2023 book on higher education

The Abundant University: Remaking Higher Education for a Digital World
- Cover
- Author: Michael D. Smith
- Language: English
- Subject: Higher education, digital transformation, educational technology
- Genre: Non-fiction
- Publisher: MIT Press
- Publication date: September 19, 2023
- Publication place: United States
- Media type: Print (hardcover), eBook
- Pages: 296
- Awards: The Phillip E. Frandson Award for Literature (2024)
- ISBN: 9780262048552

The Abundant University: Remaking Higher Education for a Digital World is a 2023 book by Michael D. Smith, published by MIT Press. The author traces the financial and ethical challenges facing modern higher education and advocates for the transformative potential of digital technologies to address these issues. Smith argues that the current model of higher education, characterized by scarcity in enrollment, instruction, and credentialing, is unsustainable and exacerbates social inequality. By embracing digital platforms for learning and credentialing, the author proposes a shift toward a more inclusive, affordable, and effective educational system that better serves students, employers, and society. Smith builds on his previous work in the digital transformation of other industries to critique the exclusivity of traditional higher education and highlight the possibilities of abundant, technology-driven learning. The work won the Phillip E. Frandson Award for Literature in 2024, and the MIT Press Alumni Book Award in 2025.

== Background ==
In an October 2023 interview on Two Think Minimum, the podcast of the Technology Policy Institute, the book was discussed in depth. The interviewer, Scott Wallsten, engaged with the book's ideas on how technology can make higher education more accessible and equitable by moving away from the traditional university model that "caters primarily to the elite." The author argued that an education system designed to foster talents across socioeconomic backgrounds requires "a viable high-quality alternative path" beyond the conventional four-year degree.

== Summary ==
The book examines the pressing challenges facing traditional higher education and advocates for a transition towards digital, accessible, and inclusive educational models. Smith critiques the "scarcity model" of elite universities, which perpetuates socioeconomic inequality through selective admissions, exclusive credentialing, and resource-constrained instruction. Drawing parallels with the digital transformation in the entertainment industry, Smith suggests that higher education could similarly embrace abundance through technology, allowing for broader, cost-effective access to quality education.

Smith identifies traditional universities as outdated, expensive, and exclusionary, often serving affluent families while less privileged students face high costs and limited opportunities. By embedding technology into educational systems, he argues, universities can shift to a model of abundance, enabling greater inclusivity and responsiveness to diverse student needs. His vision includes digital universities that could provide affordable, flexible, and high-quality learning, particularly benefiting students in underserved areas.

The book also discusses potential barriers to this shift, including resistance from faculty who may view digital methods as undermining established pedagogies and undervaluing the on-campus experience. Smith also explores the challenges of balancing the digital model with traditional academic values, particularly regarding research and the irreplaceable social interactions of campus life. However, he suggests that the demand for digital credentials and the growth of online education platforms will increasingly pressure universities to adapt.

While Smith acknowledges the limitations of digital-only education—such as reduced in-person interactions and potential impacts on research intensity—he remains optimistic about technology’s role in fostering a more equitable and student-centered educational landscape. He notes that, although some elite institutions have experimented with digital courses, few have fully embraced the transformative potential he envisions. Smith’s work, although largely centered on U.S. institutions, raises questions relevant to the global higher education community, advocating a future where digital technology democratizes access and redefines educational success beyond the conventional campus-based model

== Critical reception ==
Jandhyala B.G. Tilak (Note: Jandhyala B.G. Tilak of the Council for Social Development in New Delhi.) praised the author’s ability to create an engaging narrative with well-developed characters, remarking that "the author captured the complexities of human nature in a way that was both compelling and thought-provoking." However, Tilak critiqued certain parts of the book for being overly descriptive, which he felt slowed the pacing at times.

Grace Kaletski-Maisel (Note: Grace Kaletski-Maisel of the University of Central Florida.) stressed the author’s call for a shift from a scarcity-driven model in higher education to one based on abundance through digital innovation. Kaletski-Maisel noted Smith’s criticism of elite institutions that maintain exclusivity by limiting admissions and relying on conventional instructional and credentialing methods. She commended his student-centered approach but mentioned that his focus on "elite universities" could have benefited from discussing how non-elite institutions, such as community colleges, are already moving toward abundance through expanded enrollment and online learning.

== Awards ==
- The Phillip E. Frandson Award for Literature (2024)
- 2025 MIT Press Alumni Book Award
