= The Second Machine Age =

2014 nonfiction book by Erik Brynjolfsson and Andrew McAfee

The Second Machine Age: Work, Progress, and Prosperity in a Time of Brilliant Technologies
- Author: Erik Brynjolfsson; Andrew McAfee
- Language: English
- Publication date: 2014
- Preceded by: Race Against the Machine

The Second Machine Age: Work, Progress, and Prosperity in a Time of Brilliant Technologies is a 2014 book by Erik Brynjolfsson and Andrew McAfee that is a continuation of their book Race Against the Machine. They argue that the Second Machine Age is an era where machines can automate or augment cognitive tasks that previously only humans could do. They contrast this with what they call the "First Machine Age", or Industrial Revolution, when machines did the same for physical tasks. Continuing the theme of their earlier book, they advise people to "race with the machine, not against it", that is to seek to have machines become complements, not substitutes for humans.

Some examples that the book cites include "software that grades students' essays more objectively, consistently and quickly than humans" and "news articles on Forbes.com about corporate earnings previews" — "all generated by algorithms without human involvement."

== Synopsis ==
The authors summarize the contents of their book's 15 chapters on pages 11 and 12 of the book itself.

The book is divided into three sections: Chapters 1 through 6 describe "the fundamental characteristics of the second machine age," based on many examples of modern use of technology. These include a world that is increasingly digital, exponential and combinatorial, paralleling the themes in Brynjolfsson's 2013 TED talk.

Chapters 7 through 11 describe economic impacts of technology in terms of two concepts the authors call "bounty" and "spread." What they call "bounty" is their attempt to measure the benefits of new technology in ways reaching beyond such measures as GDP, which they say is inadequate. They use "spread" as a shorthand way to describe the increasing inequality that is also resulting from widespread new technology. They highlight three main drivers: skill-biased technical change (increases wages of more skilled workers relative to less skilled workers), the increase in capital income relative to labor income, and superstar effects.)

Finally, in chapters 12 through 15, the authors prescribe some policy interventions that could enhance the benefits and reduce the harm of new technologies.

== Reception ==
The book became a New York Times Bestseller and was shortlisted for the Financial Times Best Business Book of the Year Award. According to Technology Review "Its findings are relevant not just for business, but also for government, workers, and families." The Washington Post says that its strength is how it weaves micro and macroeconomics with insights from other disciplines into an accessible story. It says that the weaknesses of the book are that its policy prescriptions are "straight from the talking points that tech executives have been peddling for years on their visits to the capital", even though they are "perfectly reasonable".
