= The Great Stagnation =

2011 pamphlet by Tyler Cowen

- Author: Tyler Cowen
- Language: English
- Subject: Economic growth
- Publisher: Dutton Adult
- Publication date: 25 January 2011
- Publication place: United States
- Pages: 60
- ISBN: 9781101502259
- Followed by: Average Is Over

The Great Stagnation: How America Ate All the Low-Hanging Fruit of Modern History, Got Sick, and Will (Eventually) Feel Better is a pamphlet by Tyler Cowen published in 2011. It argues that the American economy has reached a historical technological plateau and the factors that drove economic growth for most of America's history are no longer present. These figurative "low-hanging fruit" include the cultivation of much free, previously unused land, technological breakthroughs in transport, refrigeration, electricity, mass communications, sanitation, and the growth of education. Cowen, a professor of economics at George Mason University, theorizes that these factors have contributed to stagnation in the median American wage since 1973.

The concept of a "Great Stagnation" has been contrasted with the idea of the "Great Divergence", a set of explanations that blame rising income inequality and globalization for the economic stall. Related debates have examined whether the internet's effect has yet been fully realized in production, if its users enjoy a significant consumer surplus, and how it might be further integrated into the economy. The final set of questions concerns appropriate policy responses to the problem.

The pamphlet, first published in January 2011 as an ebook, is 15,000 words long and was initially priced at US$4. A hardback version, which Cowen dubbed "the retrogression", was published in June 2011. While not all reviewers agreed with Cowen's thesis and arguments, the book was largely welcomed as timely and skilled in framing the debate around the future of the American economy.

== Synopsis ==
Of course, the personal computer and its cousin, the smartphone, have brought about some big changes. And many goods and services are now more plentiful and of better quality. But compared with what my grandmother witnessed, the basic accoutrements of life have remained broadly the same.

— Tyler Cowen describing his thesis in the New York Times

The main thesis is that economic growth has slowed in the United States and in other advanced economies, as a result of falling rates of innovation. In Chapter 1, Cowen describes the three major forms of "low-hanging fruit": the ease of cultivating free and unused land, rapid invention from 1880 to 1940 which capitalized on the scientific breakthroughs of the 18th and 19th centuries and the large returns from sending intelligent but uneducated children to school and university. There are potentially two further minor forms: cheap fossil fuels and the strength of the American constitution. Cowen concludes, "You could say, 'The modern United States was built at five forms of low-hanging fruit, and at most only two of those are still with us.' Fair enough." While they produced extremely large returns, future advances will be much more incremental. He offers anecdotal and statistical illustrations for this slowdown. First, he compares the changes witnessed by his grandmother with those of his own generation. Then, he cites median income statistics: the rate of growth drastically slowed from 1973 onwards. He further argues that the failure to diagnose the trend has led to a degradation in political discourse since left and right leaning actors blame the policies of "the other side" and "what I like to call the 'honest middle' cannot be heard above the din."

Chapter 2 examines productivity in the contemporary economy. Cowen describes spurts in productivity growth, 2.8% between 1996 and 2000 and 3.8% from 2000 to 2004, and he asks if they disprove the stagnation thesis. He concedes that there have been gains in certain areas, such as information technology, but argues that in other important areas such as finance, which is 8% of GDP, there has been less value created.

Also, whilst productivity figures have improved, median incomes and stock market prices, and thus the returns to capital and labor, have not improved. Furthermore, government consumption (government activity excluding transfer payments) represents between 15 and 20% of GDP, but since the sector is measured at cost it becomes less and less productive as it grows larger. Thus, the more government consumption there is, the more published GDP figures tend to overestimate growth in living standards.

In health care (17% of GDP), the problems of asymmetric information and moral hazard mean that increased spending results in little or no improvement in health outcomes. A similar result is observed in education, 6% of GDP, where outcomes have not improved in the last 40 years.

Chapter 3 considers whether the internet and other computing technologies disprove the argument. Cowen writes that while the internet has been fantastic for the intellectually curious, it has done little to raise material standards of living. The biggest Internet companies employ at most a few thousand people, and relatively few services are paying: "We have a collective historical memory that technological progress brings a big and predictable stream of revenue growth across most of the economy. When it comes to the web, those assumptions are turning out to be wrong or misleading."

Chapter 4 examines American politics in light of the thesis. Cowen says Paul Krugman's The Conscience of a Liberal (2007) puts the "cart before the horse" in asking for high marginal tax rates, unionization, and an egalitarian distribution of income and wealth. The policies worked in the 1950s precisely because the real income growth was there to support them. Cowen argues that the failure to recognize the stagnation has led to poor policy ideas from the right (such as "revenue generating tax cuts") and the left (redistribution of incomes). Cowen laments the "exaggeration" of both sides and the influence of political lobbying on economic policy. The growth in government, he says, was affordable during the period of lowhanging fruit, and the advances in transportation, industrial production, electronic communications and scientific management even facilitated it.

Chapter 5 proposes a simple cause for the 2008 financial crisis "We thought we were richer than we were." He argues that despite a series of regular, smaller crises since the 1980s, the crash was ultimately caused by investors taking too much risk across the economy, "housing and sub-prime loans were the proverbial canary in the coalmine."

Chapter 6 looks at solutions to the problem. Cowen praises the development of India and China as producers and consumers, the role of the internet in enlarging the scientific community, and a growing consensus for the reform of educational policy in the US. He further suggests for the social status of scientists to be raised to at least as strong a motivating factor as money can.

== Analysis ==
=== Place in the growth literature ===
Matthew Yglesias described the book's themes as a continuation and expansion of those developed by Paul Krugman in The Age of Diminished Expectations, Third Edition: U.S. Economic Policy in the 1990s (1997). Both books treat the diminishing rate of return from basic science and the effects that it has on politics, specifically "that a growing share of innovative energy is going into rent-seeking or otherwise unproductive activities".

Timothy Noah compared it to Prosperity: The Coming Twenty Year Boom and What it Means to You by Bob Davis and David Wessel, an enormously popular book at the time (1998) which today resells for a penny. He described how both Prosperity and The Great Stagnation examine the puzzle of stagnant median wages though offer starkly different opinions about the prospects for future growth and in particular the role of information technologies in that. He concluded by calling Cowen's appeal to "realistic expectations" about growth a "weird conservative echo" of the Club of Rome's liberal "era of limits gospel from the 1970s". In the summer of 2012, Robert Gordon's paper, "Is U.S. Economic Growth Over?" prompted comparisons to Cowen's thesis. Gordon also points out that the easy gains of increased labor force participation, schooling or land use have been spent, while other major innovations or industries—such as transport or sanitation—have enjoyed only gradual improvement.

=== Internet, growth and quality of life ===
Writing in Slate, Annie Lowrey compares Cowen's treatment of the internet to the "productivity paradox" first postulated by economists in the 1980s. She quoted Robert Solow, a growth theorist, who wrote in 1987 "You can see the computer age everywhere but in the productivity statistics." To explain why growth had not picked up strongly after the boom in computing products from the 1970s onwards, they suggested that the changes advantaged some firms and disadvantaged others leaving little net gain. The problem also may be partly because of deficiencies in the measurement of income and well-being. The internet promotes more free culture, the consumption of which provides utility and happiness to people but cannot be captured through GDP figures that measure revenue.

The Economist's Free Exchange blog argued that Cowen "undersold" recent innovations in digital technologies and that society was still in the process of re-organising itself around them. A growth spurt should be expected but this could take anything from years to decades, it warned. Furthermore, there are particularly large gains to be had in the area "cognition-augmenting innovations (as opposed to labor-augmenting innovations)". Writing in Forbes, Steve Denning described Cowen's "low-hanging fruit theory" as "folkloric nonsense". The world of 1953, when Denning was young, is inconceivable to a young person today, he wrote, adding that the qualification "apart from the Internet" is equivalent to saying "apart from the wheel" when discussing transport. The Financial Times reviewer recognized that Cowen, a prominent blogger, "is no Luddite...he thinks life is more fun and interesting with the internet around". He argued that most economists do not look at consumer technology to find the internet's effect on productivity but rather organizations: super-efficient retailers such as Wal-mart and Tesco have already incorporated it into their logistics. Furthermore, the pace of change means it could be a generation at least before we see the full implementation. Timothy Noah seizes upon Cowen's "concession" that the internet could well increase scientific output by allowing better communication between scientists in remote places. Just as Davis and Wessel incorrectly predicted a coming boom in middle class incomes due to computers, Cowen "seems equally wrong to suggest that computer technology is not on the verge of doing so."

=== Education and employment ===
Denning writes that the real challenge is keeping up with technological change, and in this sense, scientific management was the key American technological advance in the 20th century. It allowed American companies to provide large numbers of jobs to semi-skilled workers through supply-chain management, hierarchies, and rule-based systems. Businesses must now adjust to well-informed consumers who disdain profiteering and wish to be "delighted". A related challenge is shifting from managing semi-skilled to knowledge workers. The Economist contrasted the "Great Stagnation" thesis with the "Great Divergence" which traces the pay gap to an increasing demand for skilled workers. Timothy Noah, writing in Slate, did not share Cowen's optimism about the future of American educational attainment on the basis that President Obama "is getting tough" on teachers' unions. There have been many reforms implemented in the last thirty years that the unions initially opposed, and the United States has poorer outcomes than many OECD countries with stronger unions. Noah reminds us that the earlier authors were optimistic about increased third level enrollment and that has since fallen as have graduation rates. The United States remains significantly behind other advanced countries in educational outcomes offering a perverse hope for improvement.

David Brooks argued that a more fundamental shift from a materialist to a post-materialist mindset has occurred in recent generations. While for generations born early in the century increased income was the same as improvements in lifestyle this is no longer true for people born into an affluent, information driven world. Younger generations live much more intellectually diverse lives and cites much user generated content as being mostly produced outside of the monetary economy. He affirms Cowen's acknowledgment that this has brought large increases in human happiness with correspondingly little economic activity.

=== Relationship to the 2008 financial crisis and recession ===
The Economist criticized Cowen for associating the economic problems resulting from the 2008 financial crisis to his broader thesis, arguing instead that this was mostly caused by a demand shock and mostly preventable. Some scholars, such as Jim Rickards, Howard Qi, Hongbin Song, etc., point out that the demand shock was only the phenomenon, a result of a more serious underlying structural problem in the American economy. Furthermore, Howard Qi argues that the education in the US is not conducive to producing high quality scientists and engineers from the American citizens. Instead, the US is becoming increasingly and vitally relying on foreign students in the US universities to support the intellectual need in the US's science and engineering. Matthew Yglesias also disagreed with the link: "Rich countries have experienced very divergent fates over the past 36 months when the key evidence for the technological stagnation thesis is that rich countries have experienced a broadly similar fate over the past 36 years", he writes.

=== Policy responses ===
Cowen writes that one way to improve innovation is to raise the social status of scientists, a suggestion described as "a bit empty" and not fully congruent with the problem of recent innovations being private goods, such as financial sector innovation, rather than public ones such as penicillin or the rail-road. Noah described Cowen's prescriptions, encouragement of free trade, more higher status for scientists, and resignation to the "new normal" as "absurdly half-hearted".

Writing on The Economist's Free Exchange blog, R.A. concluded that Cowen's analysis of education suggested that the rich world would do better by aiding mass education programs in developing countries rather than pursuing the diminishing returns in domestic education and research, in contrary to President Obama's State of the Union speech in 2011. Looser immigration law would also allow rich and poor countries to exploit this source of growth. Secondly, it proposed to harvest "policy low-hanging fruit" i.e. reforming or abolishing foolish and costly policies. It proposed taxing "bads" such as traffic congestion and pollution rather than "goods" such as income, reducing spending on medical treatments with no clear benefits, and removing agricultural subsidies and mortgage interest deduction. In The Economist, two different sets of policy responses were considered depending on whether the true cause is ailing technological innovation or a decline in workers' bargaining power in the face of emerging-market industrialization. Progressive taxation and redistribution would offset labor's position of weakness whilst a limited state would reduce commitments it cannot expect to fulfill in a stagnating economy.

== Publication and reception ==
The Economist noted that the "publishing model is fascinating in its own right". A hardback version, which Cowen dubbed "the retrogression", was published in June 2011. Yglesias described the publication as an innovation in "current affairs publishing" and "much shorter and cheaper than a conventional book in a way that actually leaves you wanting to read more once you finish it. My guess is that this is the future of books." The book has been compared to economic and political pamphlets of the 17th century, which were frequently used to quickly get ideas about current affairs into circulation.

The Economist welcomed The Great Stagnation as "an important [book] that will have a profound impact on the way people think about the last thirty years". It praised "the trains of thought it suggests" and said the book merited "a rigorous debate" which should encourage different policy choices across the political spectrum. Matthew Yglesias described the book as a "bravura performance from one of the most interesting thinkers out there". However, he said it was remarkably silent on intellectual property law and the implications for society in a world in which most of the increase in output comes from catch-up growth from poor countries. The Wall Street Journal described the book as Cowen's most impactful book due to the direction in which he leads the debate. "What is exciting is to imagine students, economists, and scientists across the country reading the book, coming to terms with the depth of our challenge and pursuing new ways of trying to 'fix' things or generally improve our lot." "A small book but a big, worthwhile question", concluded The Economist. In the New York Times, David Brooks praised The Great Stagnation as "the most debated non-fiction book so far this year", which Timothy Noah described as a great favor to the book's marketing though an exaggeration considering the discussion surrounding Battle Hymn of the Tiger Mother by Amy Chua.

== Sequel ==
In September 2013, a sequel by Cowen, titled Average Is Over: Powering America Beyond the Age of the Great Stagnation, was published by Dutton Books. The sequel focused on Cowen's vision for how the United States economy would recover and grow over the coming decades, and the types of jobs that would exist in the new economy.
