= Will Page =

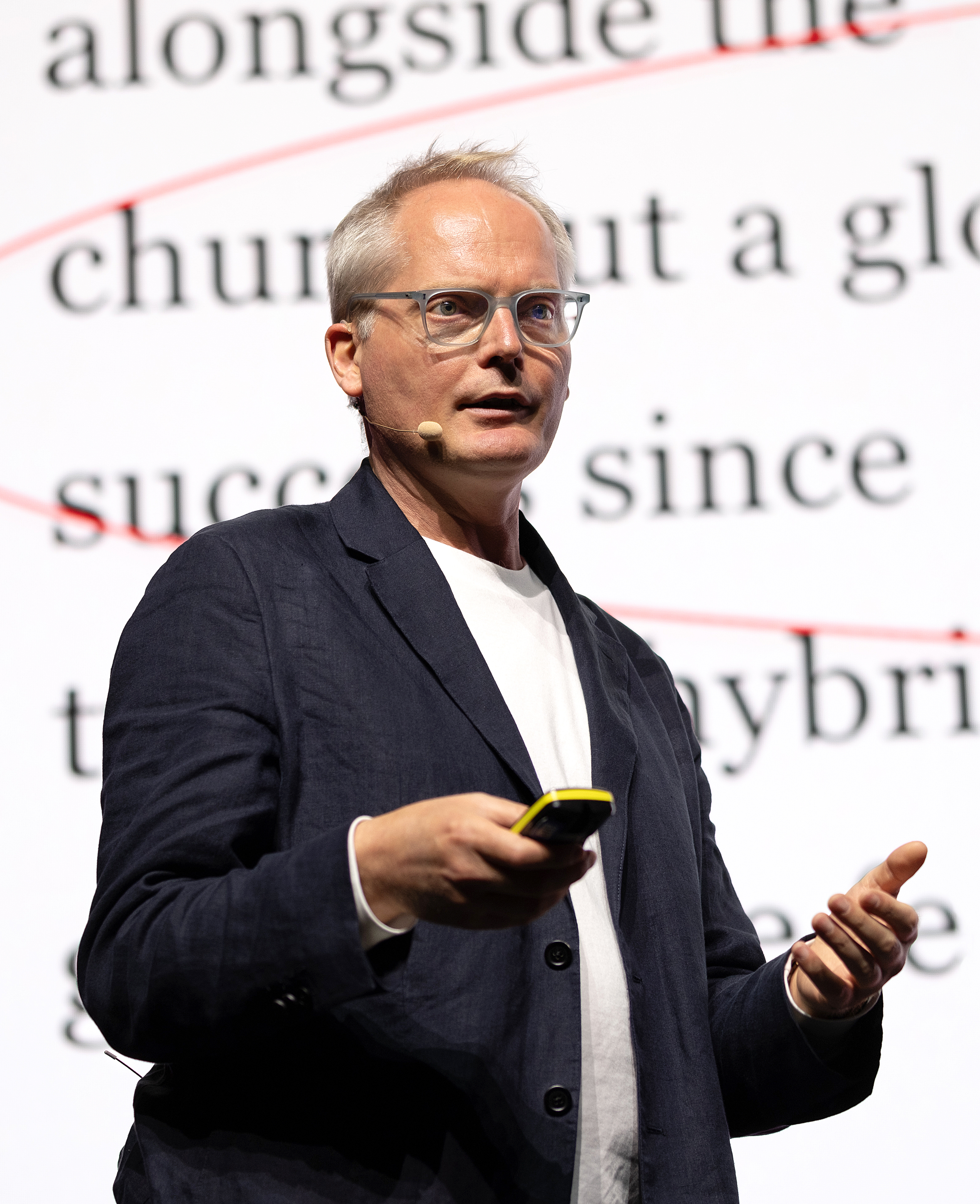
- Will Page at the 2025 SXSW London festival in London, UK
- Occupations: Economist, author

Will Page is a British economist, author, podcaster and DJ. He is the former Chief Economist at streaming music service Spotify, a Fellow of the Royal Society of the Arts, and a Visiting Fellow at the London School of Economics and the Edinburgh Futures Institute.

== Career ==
Page graduated with an MSc in Economics at the University of Edinburgh in 2002. His Master's thesis ‘Germany's Mezzogiorno Revisited’ looked at the problems facing East Germany ten years after German Reunification. The paper was published by Deutsche Bank in 2003, and cited in 2005 by Martin Wolf in the Financial Times.

=== Early career ===
From 2002 to 2006 Page worked for the Government Economic Service at the Scottish Executive, working for the Office of the Chief Economic Adviser and Department of Finance. He contributed to the Scottish Executive Economic Discussion Paper Series with a publication on ‘Infrastructure Investment & Economic Growth’. While there he moonlighted as a music journalist for the magazine Straight No Chaser.

=== PRS for Music ===
From 2006 to 2012 Page was Chief Economist at PRS for Music, a non-profit collection society representing writers, composers and music publishers in the UK.

In this role he published writing about topics such as the economic strength of the UK music industry and Long Tail theory in the music industry. and on the success of Radiohead's In Rainbows album.

In 2008 he co-authored an influential paper in which he challenged Chris Anderson's popular Long Tail theory, showing that the demand for digital music instead followed a log-normal distribution. In another paper, In Rainbows, On Torrents written with Eric Garland, Page discussed whether Radiohead's innovative pay-what-you-wish release of its seventh album could compete with illegal free downloads, and observed that it could not, with two million copies of the album shared on file-sharing networks within a month of release; as the Washington Post summed it up, "legal free was trumped by illegal free."

In May 2010 Page helped save the new music radio station BBC 6 Music.

=== Spotify ===
Page joined Spotify as Chief Economist in 2012. In this role he was deeply involved in Spotify's industry outreach and lobbying efforts.

Early in his career at Spotify, he focussed heavily on the impact the Swedish streaming service was having on music piracy. Focussing on The Netherlands he established that "piracy [in the Netherlands] overall is now lower, and artists that engage with Spotify see less piracy." This work led to a study on Spotify's relationship with festivals in the Netherlands and a similar study on piracy in Australia that showed a decrease in downloads from 2012 to 2014.

Page's focus then moved to the transformative impact Spotify was having on the music business generally, and how it exposed concepts like 'catalogue' and 'frontline' as antiquated and not fit for purpose. In a seminal study on the band Imagine Dragons, he demonstrated how artists will often see more streams in the second year of release than the first.

He was an expert witness in the US Copyright Royalty Board's Determination of Rates and Terms for Making and Distributing Phonorecords, often termed "Phonorecords III", regarding mechanical streaming rates. He challenged the claims that Spotify was at fault for cannibalizing revenues from downloads by showing how Canada's iTunes revenues, for example, went into decline without the presence of streaming services like Spotify.

Throughout his tenure at Spotify he championed the global value of copyright by piecing together three sources of revenue that are typically presented independently: the IFPI Global Music Report; CISAC's Global Collections Report; and Music & Copyright value of music publishing. His work included an annual analysis on the global value of copyright.

His work also looked at data on how songs were becoming hits for artists like Lorde as streaming took hold, and drew attention to the value of the UK music industry as a national export.

In 2019 he left Spotify to transition from economist to author, having contracted with Simon and Schuster in the UK and Little Brown & Company in the US to write a consumer-facing book about disruption in various industries. The book, titled Tarzan Economics: Eight Principles for Pivoting Through Disruption, came out in 2021.

=== London School of Economics ===
In 2020 Page was made a fellow of the London School of Economics Marshall Institute, and has continued his affiliation with its European Institute from 2021 through the present. With Chris Dalla Riva he wrote the paper "‘Glocalisation’ of Music Streaming within and across Europe" for the LSE. It explored the unexpected rise of local artists on global streaming services.

=== Tarzan Economics ===
In May 2021 his book Tarzan Economics: Eight Principles for Pivoting Through Disruption was published by Simon and Schuster in the UK and by Little, Brown and Company in the US. The book argued that industries need to find ways to work with, not against, disruption, and that the experience of the music industry bears lessons for other sectors. The book has secured five translations to date: into Chinese, Taiwanese, Japanese, Korean and German. On Audible, the book is narrated by Angus King.

In his post-Spotify career Page continued to report on the total global value of music copyright and other aspects of the music business, such as the impact of COVID-19, new developments in streaming services, and artists' objections to streaming services' practices.

== Podcast ==
Beginning in May 2021 Page and Richard Kramer have co-hosted "Bubble Trouble," a podcast on the Magnificent Noise network discussing inconvenient truths about financial markets.

== Documentary ==
In 2019, Page was an executive producer of the documentary Black Stars of Highlife which traced the history of Highlife music from its origins in Ghana and through its many fusions, telling a story of musical cross-pollination between the West and West Africa.

== DJ ==
Page has released an annual DJ mix on MixCloud. Carole King provided the introduction for the most recent, titled "Believe in Humanity" after King's song of that name.

== Publications ==
=== Books ===
Tarzan Economics: Eight Principles for Pivoting Through Disruption, Little, Brown and Company, 2021

=== Academic papers and studies ===
2023: "‘Glocalisation’ of Music Streaming within and across Europe" – inspired by British artists having accounted for all of the Top 10 in Britain's end-of-year singles chart in 2022, this study found that in most countries studied, the share of domestic artists and songs in a country's Top 10 had increased: "Contrary to the perverse effects of globalisation where large markets often dominate small, we uncover evidence of local markets growing in their domestic identity."

2021: "Twitch's Rockonomics" – a study of how live streaming and live music could coexist after the COVID-19 pandemic

2015–Present: Annual reports on the global value of music copyright, analyses showing, for example, that the total value had increased from $25 billion in 2015 to $39.6 billion in 2021, and that the percentage of the total from streaming rose from 22% in 2016 to 54% in 2020.

2016–2019: Discussion papers for Society of Economics Research on Copyright Issues:

- 2019: "'User-centric' revisited: The unintended consequences of royalty distribution"

- 2018: "Money in, money out: Lessons from CMOs in allocating and distributing licensing revenue"

- 2017: "The causes and consequences of allocating revenue between mechanical and performing rights"

- 2016: "Can two societies ever be better than one?"

2012–2019: Various publications for Spotify on subjects such as online privacy, online advertising, and social media, such as "Does the music industry's definition of 'catalogue' need an upgrade?"

For PRS 2006–2012:

- A series of analyses on the music industry for PRS' Economic Insight such as "A songwriter’s perspective on 6 Music"

=== Journalism ===
Financial Times articles including:

- "Roar of the live music crowd drowns out stadium income from sport"
- "Vinyl, the music format that came back from the dead"
- "Everyone’s a winner in Spotify’s face-off with Neil Young"
- "The music industry makes more money but has more mouths to feed"
- "Taylor Swift, Bob Dylan and the future of streaming"

The Economist

- "Spotify, Joe Rogan and the Wild West of online audio"
- "And the winner is...who cares?"

Numerous articles for Billboard including:

- "Examining COVID-19’s Impact on Britain’s Live and Recorded Music Industries"
- "Is The Music Copyright Business Worth More Than Ever?"
