= Economics of digitization =

Field of study

The economics of digitization is the field of economics that studies how digitization, digitalisation and digital transformation affects markets and how digital data can be used to study economics. Digitization is the process by which technology lowers the costs of storing, sharing, and analyzing data. This has changed how consumers behave, how industrial activity is organized, and how governments operate. The economics of digitization exists as a distinct field of economics for three reasons: it studies a world that is digital, exponential and combinatorial. First, new economic models are needed because digital goods have very low or even zero marginal costs unlike most traditional goods, thus many traditional assumptions no longer hold in a digitized world. Second, the rate of improvement of computers, networks and other engines of digitization, is exponential, as reflected by Moore's Law. Third, digital goods can easily be combined and recombined, increasing their value not only via networks and platforms, but also novel combinations. Each of these effects is important individually, but together they have synergies and constitute a distinct economic landscape.

Research in the economics of digitization touches on several fields of economics including industrial organization, labor economics, and intellectual property. Consequently, many of the contributions to the economics of digitization have also found an intellectual home in these fields. An underlying theme in much of the work in the field is that existing government regulation of copyright, security, and antitrust is inappropriate in the modern world. For example, information goods, such as news articles and movies, now have zero marginal costs of production and sharing. This has made the redistribution without permission common and has increased competition between providers of information goods. Research in the economics of digitization studies how policy should adapt in response to these changes.

The field is relatively new. The National Bureau of Economic Research created their first workshop on the Economics of Information Technology and Digitization in 2011, with sessions on digital advertising, digitization and productivity, and related topics.

== Information technology and access to networks ==
=== Technological standards ===
The Internet is a multi-layered network which is operated by a variety of participants. The Internet has come to mean a combination of standards, networks, and web applications (such as streaming and file-sharing), among other components, that have accumulated around networking technology. The emergence of the Internet coincided with the growth of a new type of organizational structure, the standards committee. Standards committees are responsible for designing critical standards for the Internet such as TCP/IP, HTML, and CSS. These committees are composed of representatives from firms, academia, and non-profit organizations. Their goal is to make decisions that advance technology while retaining interoperability between Internet components. Economists are interested in how these organizational structures make decisions and whether those decisions are optimal.

=== The supply of Internet access ===
The commercial supply of Internet access began when the National Science Foundation removed restrictions for using the Internet for commercial purposes. During the 90's internet access was provided by numerous regional and national Internet service providers (ISPs). However, by 2014, the provision of high-speed broadband access was consolidated. About 80% of Americans can only buy 25 Mbit/s from one provider and a majority only have a choice of two providers for 10 Mbit/s service. Economists are particularly interested by competition and network effects within this industry. Furthermore, the availability of broadband may affect other economic outcomes such as the relative wages of skilled and unskilled workers.

=== Demand for the Internet ===
A key issue in the economics of digitization is the economic value of Internet-based services. The motivation for this question is two-fold. First, economists are interested in understanding digitization related policies such as network infrastructure investment and subsidies for Internet access. Second, economists want to measure the gains to consumers from the Internet. The revenues of Internet Service Providers provided one direct measure of the growth in the Internet economy. This is an important topic because many economists believe that traditional measures of economic growth, such as GDP, understate the true benefits of improving technology. The modern digital economy also tends to lead to reliance on inputs with zero price.

== The effects of digitization on industrial organization ==
=== Platforms and online marketplaces ===
Digitization has coincided with the increased prominence of platforms and marketplaces that connect diverse agents in social and economic activity. A platform is defined by Bresnahan and Greenstein (1999) as "a reconfigurable base of compatible components on which users build applications". Platforms are most readily identified with their technical standards, i.e., engineering specifications for hardware and standards for software. The pricing and product strategies that platforms use differ from those of traditional firms because of the presence of network effects. Network effects arise within platforms because participation by one group affects the utility of another group. Many online platforms replicate identical process or algorithms at virtually no cost, allowing them to scale the network effect without encountering diminishing returns. Large scale network effects make the analysis of competition between platforms more complex than the analysis of competition between traditional firms. Much work in the economics of digitization studies the question of how these firms should operate and how they compete with each other. A particularly important issue is whether markets for online platforms have a tendency towards "winner-takes-all" competitive outcomes, and should be subject to antitrust actions.

Online platforms often drastically reduce transactions costs, especially in markets where the quality of a good or trading partner is uncertain. For example, eBay drastically increased the market for used consumer goods by offering a search engine, reputation system, and other services that make trade less risky. Other online marketplaces of this type include Airbnb for accommodations, Prosper for lending, and Odesk for labor. Economists are interested in quantifying the gains from these marketplaces and studying how they should be designed. For example, eBay, Odesk, and other marketplaces have adapted the use of auctions as a selling mechanisms. This has prompted a large literature on the comparative advantages of selling goods via auction versus using a fixed price.

=== User-generated content and open source production ===
Digitization has coincided with the production of software and content by users who are not directly compensated for their work. Furthermore, those goods are typically distributed for free on the Internet. Prominent examples of open-source software include the Apache HTTP Server, Mozilla Firefox, and the Linux operating system. Economists are interested in the incentives of users to produce this software and how this software either substitutes or complements existing production processes. Another area of study is estimating the degree to which GDP and other measures of economic activity are mis-measured due to open source software. For example, Greenstein and Nagle (2014) estimate that Apache alone accounts for a mis-measurement between $2 billion and $12 billion.

In addition, open source production can be used for hardware, known as open hardware, normally by sharing digital designs such as CAD files. Sharing of open hardware designs can generate significant value because of the ability to digitally replicate products for approximately the cost of materials using technologies such as 3D printers.

Another active area of research studies the incentives to produce user-generated content such as Wikipedia articles, digital videos, blogs, podcasts, etc. For example, Zhang and Zhu (2011) show that Wikipedia contributors are motivated by the social interaction with other contributors. Greenstein and Zhu (2012) show that while many Wikipedia articles exhibit slant, the overall level of slant across articles on Wikipedia has diminished over time.

=== Advertising ===
Advertising is an important source of revenue for information goods, both online and offline. Given the prevalence of advertising-supported information goods online, it is important to understand how online advertising works. Economists have spent much effort in trying to quantify the returns to online advertising. One especially interesting aspect of online advertising is its ability to target customers using fine demographic and behavioral data. This ability potentially affects the ability of new and small firms to gain exposure to customers and to grow. Targeted advertising is controversial because it sometimes uses private data about individuals obtained through third-party sources. Quantifying the costs and benefits of using this type of data is an active research area in the field.

== The effects of digitization on consumer choice ==
=== Search, search engines and recommendation systems ===
Perhaps the oldest and largest stream of research on the Internet and market frictions emphasizes reduced search costs. This literature builds on an older theory literature in economics that examines how search costs affect prices. Digitization of retail and marketing meant that consumers could easily compare prices across stores, so the empirical work on Internet pricing examined the impact on prices and price dispersion. Initially hypothesized by Bakos (1997), the first wave of this research empirically documented lower prices, but still substantial dispersion.

The newest wave of this research collects data about online searches to examine the actual search process that consumers undertake when looking for a product online. This question also emphasizes that the final stage of purchase is often controlled by a more familiar retail environment, and it raises questions about the growing importance of standards and platforms in the distribution of creative content.

As noted earlier, near-zero marginal costs of distribution for information goods might change where and how information goods get consumed. Geographic boundaries might be less important if information can travel long distances for free. One open question concerns the incidence of the impact of low distribution costs. The benefits might vary by location, with locations with fewer offline options generating a larger benefit from digitization.

Furthermore, online retailers of digital goods can carry many more products and never worry about running out of inventory. Even if a song only sells a handful of times, it is still profitable to be offered for sale on the Internet. At the same time, the zero marginal costs of distribution mean that top-selling (superstar) items never go out of stock and therefore can achieve even higher sales (Anderson, 2006). Several papers in the literature attempt to quantify the economic impact of increased product variety made available through electronic markets. Bar-Isaac et al. (2012) derive a theory of when lower search costs will result in 'superstar' and 'long-tail' effects.

=== Reputation systems ===
One particularly important aspect of digitization for consumers is the increased use of reputation systems on retail websites and online marketplaces. Sixty-eight percent of respondents in a 2013 Nielsen survey said that they trusted online reviews. Numerous papers have shown that these review systems affect consumer demand for restaurants books, and hotels. A key area of research in digitization studies whether online reputations accurately reveal both the vertical and horizontal quality of a good. For example, Forman et al. (2008) show that local reviews have more effect than reviews from distant reviewers, suggesting that reviews provide information about both vertical and horizontal differentiation. On the other hand, several show that online review are biased because not everyone leaves reviews, because reviewers are afraid of retaliation, and because sellers may promote their own products using the review system. Newer research proposes designs for reputation systems that more efficiently aggregate information about the experiences of users.

== The effects of digitization on labor markets ==
Digitization has partially or fully replaced many tasks that were previously done by human laborers. At the same time, computers have made some workers much more productive. Economists are interested in understanding how these two forces interact in determining labor market outcomes. For example, a large literature studies the magnitude and causes of skill-biased technical change, the process by which technology improves wages for educated workers. Alternatively, Autor (2014) describes a framework for classifying jobs into those more or less prone to replacement by computers. Furthermore, the use of information technology only increases productivity when it's complemented by organization changes. For example, Garicano and Heation (2010) show that IT increases the productivity of police departments only when those police departments increased training and expanded support personnel. Work by Bresnahan, Brynjolfsson and Hitt (2002) found evidence of organizational complementarities with information technology and boosted the demand for skilled labor.

Another consequence of digitization is that it has drastically reduced the costs of communication between workers across different organizations and locations. This has led to a change in the geographic and contractual organization of production. Economists are interested in the magnitude of this change and its effect on local labor markets. A recent study found that the potential of manufacturing sector jobs to be offshored did not reduce wages in the US. However, survey evidence suggests that 25% of American jobs are potentially offshorable in the future.

Online labor market platforms like Odesk and Amazon Mechanical Turk represent a particularly interesting form of labor production arising out of digitization. Economists who study these platforms are interested in how they compete with or complement more traditional firms. Another active area of research is how to incentivize workers on these platforms to produce more efficiently. While workers engaged in routine, lower-skill tasks such as data entry are particularly susceptible to competition from online labor markets, creative professions are also exposed, as many online platforms now provide opportunities to crowdsource creative work.

== Government policy and digitization ==
=== Intellectual property and digitization ===
One main area of policy interest related to digitization concerns intellectual property. The justification for giving copyright and patent right relies on the theory that the potential to gain these rights encourages the production and sharing of intellectual property. However, digitization and ease of copying has made it difficult to defend intellectual property rights, especially in the case of copyright. Varian (2005) supplies a theoretical framework for thinking about this change from an economics perspective. Usually, the economic effect on copyright-holders in the context of free copying is considered to be negative. However, Varian suggests an important counter-argument. If the value a consumer puts on the right to copy is greater than the reduction in sales, a seller can increase profits by allowing that right. Varian also provides a detailed description of several business models which potentially address the greater difficulty of enforcing copyrights as digitization increases. Alternative business models for intellectual property holders include selling complementary goods, subscriptions, personalization, and advertising.

Empirical research in this area studies the effects of Internet file-sharing on the supply and demand for paid content. For example, Danaher et al. 2010 show that the removal of NBC content from iTunes increased the illicit copying of NBC shows by 11.4%. This result shows that licensed and unlicensed content are substitutes. Giorcelli and Moser (2014) show that the spread of copyright in Italy between 1770 and 1900 increased the production of new and better operas. Still, there is little work on how these empirical results should inform copyright rules and security practices.

=== Privacy, security, and digitization ===
Privacy and data security is an area where digitization has substantially changed the costs and benefits to various economic actors. Traditional policies regarding privacy circumscribed the ability of government agencies to access individual data. However, the large-scale ability of firms to collect, parse, and analyze detailed micro-level data about consumers has shifted the policy focus. Now, the concern is whether firms' access consumer data should be regulation and restricted. In the past decade, theoretical work on commercial privacy has tended to focus on behavioral price discrimination as being a potential application of a context where researchers can model privacy concerns from an economics perspective.

Goldfarb and Tucker (2011a) wrote the first paper to empirically study the economic effects of privacy regulation for the advertising-supported Internet. The implementation of privacy regulation in Europe has made it more difficult for firms to collect and use consumer browsing data to target their ads more accurately; the field test data shows these policies are associated with a 65 percent reduction in the influence banner ads have on purchase intent. As well as this main effect, their research also suggests that privacy regulation might change the web landscape in unanticipated ways, with advertising becoming even more intrusive. It also might lead marketers to shift their media buys away from newspapers because of difficulties in finding relevant advertising to show.

Another related concern is what precautions should firms take to prevent data breaches such as those at Target and Staples. Arora et al. (2010) models the firm's effort in securing data from an economics perspective. They find that direct competition reduces the time that a firm takes to patch a vulnerability to its software. Other attempts at measuring the consequences of information security policy from an economics perspective are Miller and Tucker (2011), who look at policies mandating encryption, and Romanosky et al. (2011), who look at mandatory breach notification laws.

=== Other issues ===
There are many other policies related to digitization that are of interest to economists. For example, digitization may affect government effectiveness and accountability. Digitization also makes it easier for firms in one jurisdiction to supply consumers in another. This creates challenges for tax enforcement. Another issue is that companies with new, Internet based business models, such as Airbnb and Uber, pose challenges for regulation aimed at traditional service providers. Many safety and quality enforcement regulations may no longer be necessary with the advent of online reputation systems. Lastly, digitization is of great importance to health care policy. For example, electronic medical records have the potential to make healthcare more effective but pose challenges to privacy policy.

== Books ==
In May 2015 the National Bureau of Economic Research published a book with University of Chicago Press entitled "Economic Analysis of the Digital Economy." The editors for the book are Avi Goldfarb, Shane Greenstein, and Catherine Tucker. The volume brings together leading scholars to explore this emerging area of research. This follows on a book that collected twenty-five important articles in the area, published by Edward Elgar Publishing, titled "Economics of Digitization."

== See also ==
- Post-scarcity economy
