= Alex Tabarrok =

Canadian-American economist

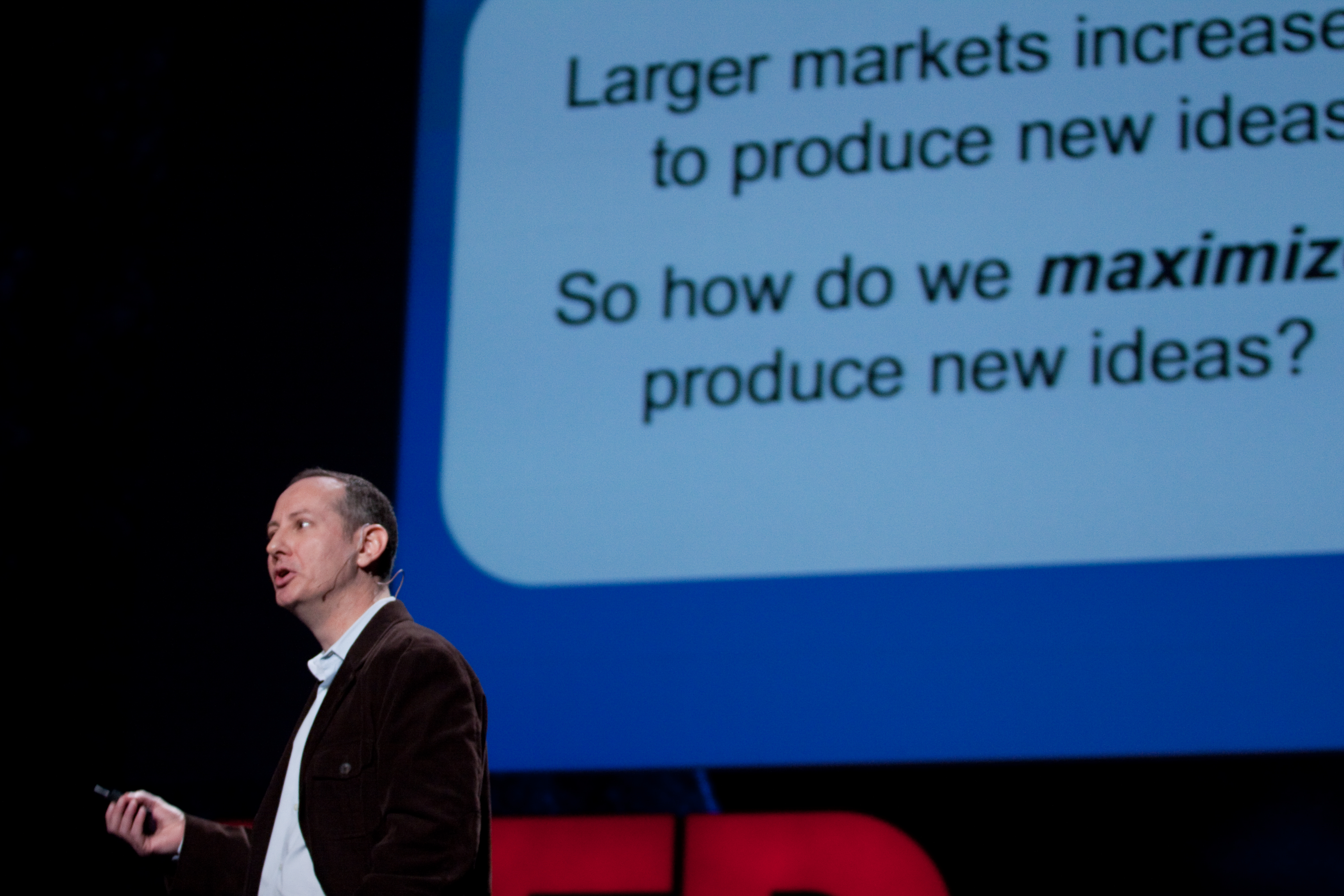
- Tabarrok speaking at TED in 2009
- Born: November 11, 1966 (age 59)

Academic background
- Education: University of Victoria (BA); George Mason University (PhD)

Academic work
- Institutions: George Mason University

Alexander Taghi Tabarrok (born November 11, 1966) is a Canadian-American economist. Tabarrok is a professor at George Mason University and Bartley J. Madden Chair in Economics at the school's Mercatus Center.

With Tyler Cowen, he co-authors the economics blog Marginal Revolution, which began in August 2003. In 2012, Tabarrok and Cowen co-founded Marginal Revolution University, which offers free online economics courses.

== Education and career ==
He earned a B.A. from the University of Victoria in Canada in 1989 and received his Ph.D. from George Mason University in 1994.

From 1999 until 2013 he was director of research for the Independent Institute, an Oakland, California-based think tank.

He taught at Ball State University from 1995 to 1999 and joined George Mason University in 2002.

== Research and writing ==
He has done work on dominant assurance contracts, law and economics, and health economics. In his 1998 model of dominant assurance contracts, an entrepreneur pays a bonus to people who pledged to contribute if participation is insufficient to provide a public good.

During the COVID-19 pandemic, Tabarrok worked with the Accelerating Health Technologies group on proposals to expand vaccine production and accelerate vaccine availability.

Tabarrok is co-author with Cowen of the textbook Modern Principles of Economics and author of Launching the Innovation Renaissance (2011).

In 2012, journalist David Brooks called Tabarrok one of the most influential bloggers on the political right, writing that he is among those who "start from broadly libertarian premises but do not apply them in a doctrinaire way."
