= MIT Center for Digital Business =

Privately-funded research institution

The 'MIT Center for Digital Business' is an industry-funded research center headquartered at the MIT Sloan School of Management.

== MIT Initiative on the Digital Economy ==
In 2013, the Center for Digital Business organized and launched the Institute-wide MIT Initiative on the Digital Economy, to address the impact of digital technologies on the world, led by Erik Brynjolfsson and Andrew McAfee.

== See also ==
- Digital Transformation (Business)
