= Yu (Jeffrey) Hu =

Yu Jeffrey Hu is a full professor and Accenture Chair at Purdue University’s Daniels School of Business. He is also a Distinguished Fellow of the INFORMS Information Systems Society, and has been a Digital Fellow at MIT’s Initiative on the Digital Economy.

== Career ==
Hu's research uses AI, econometric, and analytical models to quantify technology-driven user experience in environments such as electronic commerce, omni-channel retailing, offline commerce, social media, mobile app, fintech, and healthcare.

He coauthored the first paper discovering the "Long Tail" phenomenon in Internet markets, the first paper proving the value of social media in predicting stock markets, and the first paper using interpretable AI to quantify ROI of marketing campaigns. He has been an expert, consultant, or advisor for governments in the U.S., Europe, and Asia and many large companies around the world. He is frequently invited to speak at industry conferences.

His research has been published in top journals such as Management Science, Information Systems Research, Management Information Systems Quarterly, Review of Financial Studies, Marketing Science, and MIT Sloan Management Review. His research has been discussed and cited by media outlets such as Wall Street Journal, New York Times, Reuters, Bloomberg, InformationWeek, Wired Magazine, TIME Magazine, Forbes, INC. Magazine, The Telegraph, National Public Radio, SeekingAlpha.com, Bankrate.com, etc. His papers have been adopted for classroom use by many top universities around the world.

== Works ==
=== Social media ===
- Wenqi Shen, Yu Jeffrey Hu, and Jackie Rees. (2015). Competing for Attention: An Empirical Study of Online Reviewers’ Strategic Behaviors. MIS Quarterly, 39(3) 683-696.
- Hailiang Chen, Prabuddha De, Yu Jeffrey Hu, and Byoung-Hyoun Hwang. (2014). Wisdom of Crowds: The Value of Stock Opinions Transmitted Through Social Media. Review of Financial Studies.
- Hailiang Chen, Prabuddha De, and Yu Jeffrey Hu. (2015). IT-Enabled Broadcasting in Social Media: An Empirical Study of Artists’ Activities and Music Sales. Information Systems Research, 26(3) 513-531.

=== Internet commerce and the long tail ===
- Erik Brynjolfsson, Yu (Jeffrey) Hu, Duncan Simester. (2011). Goodbye Pareto Principle, Hello Long Tail: the Effect of Search Costs on the Concentration of Product Sales. Management Science, forthcoming.
- Erik Brynjolfsson, Yu (Jeffrey) Hu, Michael D. Smith. (2010). Long Tails versus Superstars: The Effect of Information Technology on Product Variety and Sales Concentration Patterns. Information Systems Research, vol. 21 (4), 736-747.
- Prabuddha De, Yu (Jeffrey) Hu, Mohammad Rahman. (2010). Technology Usage and Online Sales: An Empirical Study. Management Science, vol. 56 (11), 1930-1945.
- Erik Brynjolfsson, Yu (Jeffrey) Hu and Mohammad S. Rahman (2009). Battle of the Retail Channels: How Product Selection and Geography Drive Cross-Channel Competition. Management Science, vol. 55 (11), 1755-1765.
- Duncan Simester, Yu (Jeffrey) Hu, Erik Brynjolfsson and Eric Anderson (2009). Dynamics of Retail Advertising: Evidence from a Field Experiment. Economic Inquiry, vol. 47 (3), 482-499.
- Erik Brynjolfsson, Yu (Jeffrey) Hu and Michael D. Smith (2006). From Niches to Riches: Anatomy of the Long Tail. MIT Sloan Management Review.
- Erik Brynjolfsson, Yu (Jeffrey) Hu and Michael D. Smith (2003). Consumer Surplus in the Digital Economy: Estimating the Value of Increased Product Variety at Online Booksellers. Management Science, vol. 49 (11), 1580-1596.

=== Internet advertising ===
- Yu Jeffrey Hu, Jiwoong Shin, and Zhulei Tang. (2016). Incentive Problems in Performance-based Online Advertising: Cost-per-Click vs. Cost-per-Action. Management Science, 62(7) 2022-2038.
- Zhulei Tang, Yu (Jeffrey) Hu and Michael D. Smith (2008). Gaining Trust Through Online Privacy Protection: Self-Regulation, Mandatory Standards, or Caveat Emptor. Journal of Management Information Systems, vol. 24 (4), 153-173.
