= Race Against the Machine =

2011 non-fiction book by Erik Brynjolfsson and Andrew McAfee

- Author: Erik Brynjolfsson; Andrew McAfee
- Language: English
- Published: 2011
- Publication place: United States
- ISBN: 0-984-72511-3
- Followed by: The Second Machine Age

Race Against the Machine is a non-fiction book from 2011 by Erik Brynjolfsson and Andrew McAfee about the interaction of digital technology, employment and organization. The full title of the book is: Race Against the Machine: How the Digital Revolution Is Accelerating Innovation, Driving Productivity, and Irreversibly Transforming Employment and the Economy.

== Contents ==
The main thesis of the book is that we are in the midst of a technological revolution that is radically redefining what work is, how value is created, and how the economy distributes that value. In particular, the authors observe that after the Great Recession of 2007–2008, many measures of economic health (such as GDP, corporate profits, and investment in equipment and software) rebounded quickly, while unemployment lagged behind, which they attribute to technology eliminating the need for many forms of human labor. Examples of technology they point to are robotics, numerically controlled machines, computerized inventory management software, speech recognition, speaker recognition, language translation, self-driving vehicles, pattern recognition and online commerce. The authors write that businesses are increasingly substituting machines for people, and that rate at which digital technologies are advancing is exponentially higher than that of the organizations, institutions, and individuals within our economy. Additionally, the corporate use of equipment and software is increasing faster than the rate of employment.

Brynjolfsson and McAfee write that advanced digital technologies are making people more innovative, productive and richer, both in the short- and long-term, but potentially at the cost of increasing wealth inequality in society. In the authors' view, one of the main in-egalitarian consequences of digital technological developments is its potentially negative impact on some types of employment, such as routine information processing work. The authors appear to advocate for a collaborative partnership between computers and humans as the road to future job creation. "In medicine, law, finance, retailing, manufacturing and even scientific discovery," they write, "the key to winning the race is not to compete against machines but to compete with machines."

== Recommendations ==
Given the advancement of technology, the authors have several recommendations for policymakers in the United States to increase economic prosperity, including:

- Investing more in education, starting with increasing teacher salaries
- More accountability for teachers on performance metrics, possibly including the elimination of tenure
- Focus education on useful outcomes and less on signaling prestige, time, or effort, by separating instruction from certification and testing
- More instructional hours per year for K–12 students
- Expand immigration of entrepreneurs and skilled workers, including both permanent residents and H1-B
- Teach entrepreneurship skills in higher education (outside of business schools)
- Speed the creation of startups with franchise opportunities, online guides, and clearinghouses
- Reduce regulatory barriers to new business creation
- Invest more in communication and transportation infrastructure improvements
- Invest more in government funding for basic research
- Maintain labor market fluidity and the ability to hire and fire
- Reduce payroll taxes (to make it more attractive to hire a person rather than a machine) and increase taxes on congestion and pollution
- De-couple health insurance from employment
- Keep crowdsourcing businesses like Amazon Mechanical Turk lightly regulated to allow experimentation
- Eliminate tax breaks for home mortgages and reallocate the proceeds to education and research
- Reduce government subsidies for the financial services industry, to free talent for other industries
- Reform the patent system, and speed up patent adjudication
- Reduce the length of copyright terms and expand fair use

== Criticism ==
Like Jeremy Rifkin's book The End of Work, The Race against the Machine has been criticized for lacking credible evidence in making predictions about future job loss. Recent research suggest the invention and distribution of computers during the 1990s increased employment, rather than decreased it.

== See also ==
- Technological unemployment
- Automate This
- Martin Ford (author)
