= Tyler Cowen =

American economist (born 1962)

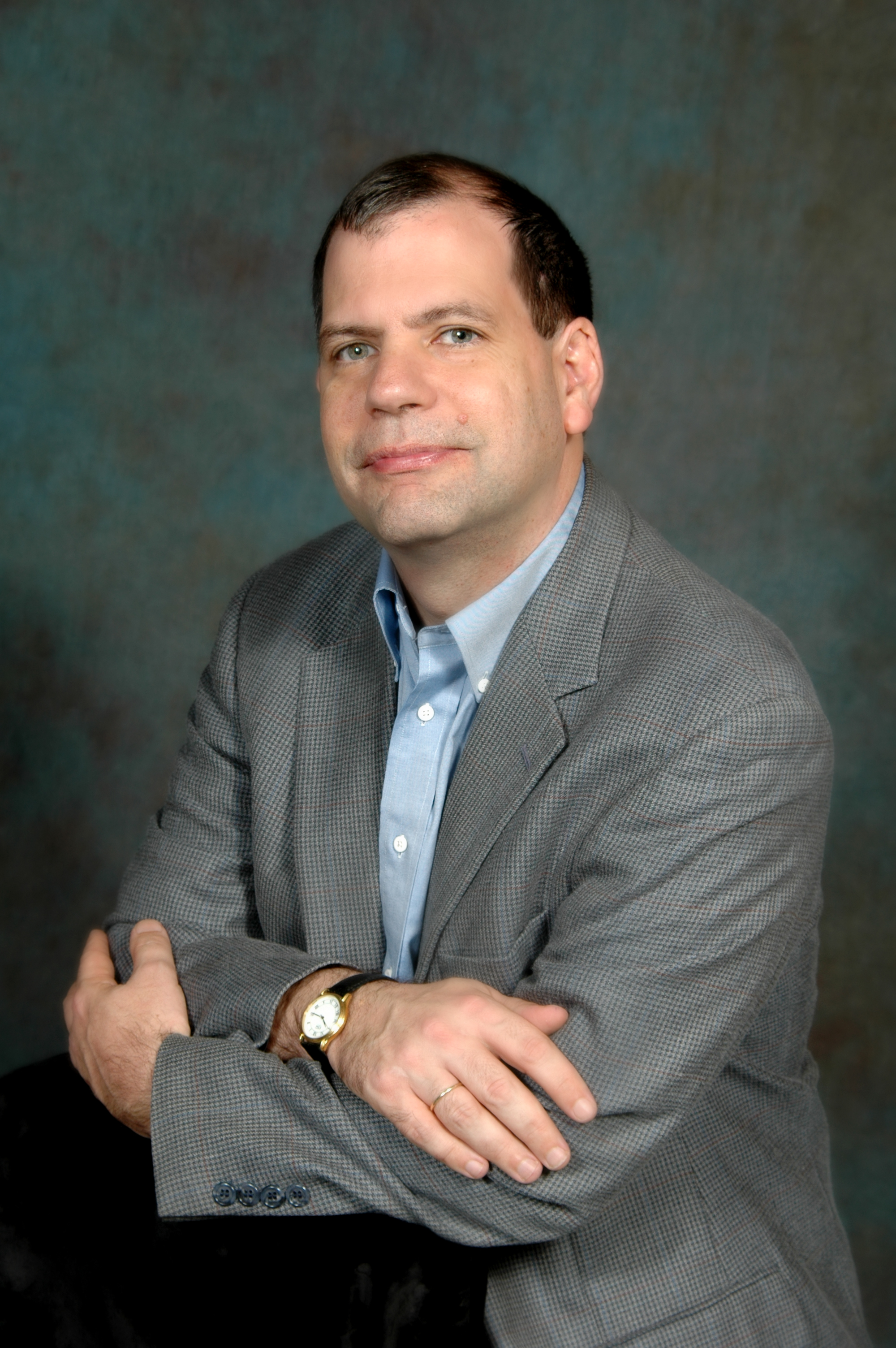
- Cowen in 2007
- Born: January 21, 1962 (age 64); Bergen County, New Jersey, U.S.

Academic background
- Education: George Mason University (BS); Harvard University (MS, PhD)
- Thesis: Essays in the Theory of Welfare Economics (1987)
- Doctoral advisor: Thomas Schelling
- Influences: Plato

Academic work
- Discipline: Cultural economics
- School or tradition: Neoclassical economics American libertarianism
- Institutions: George Mason University
- Website: marginalrevolution.com

Tyler Cowen (/ˈkaʊən/; born January 21, 1962) is an American economist, author, and public intellectual. He is the Holbert L. Harris Professor of Economics at George Mason University and serves as chairman of the university's Mercatus Center. Cowen writes for his blog Marginal Revolution, which he has co-authored with Alex Tabarrok since 2003, and hosts the interview podcast Conversations with Tyler.

Cowen's work spans economics, philosophy, and cultural commentary. He advocates for a pragmatic form of libertarianism that emphasizes strong governance, economic dynamism, and technological progress—an approach he terms state capacity libertarianism. In 2011, he was included in Foreign Policy's list of the 'Top 100 Global Thinkers,' and Prospect magazine ranked him #21 among its "World Thinkers 2015." The Economist named him among its "Most Influential Economists" in 2024.

== Education and early life ==
Cowen was raised in Hillsdale, New Jersey, and attended Pascack Valley High School. At 15, he became the youngest ever New Jersey state chess champion. Cowen is of Irish ancestry.

He graduated from George Mason University with a Bachelor of Science degree in economics in 1983 and received his PhD in economics from Harvard University in 1987 with a thesis on Essays in the Theory of Welfare Economics. At Harvard, he was mentored by game theorist Thomas Schelling, the 2005 recipient of the Nobel Memorial Prize in Economics.

== Academic career ==
Cowen joined the faculty of George Mason University shortly after completing his doctorate. He holds the Holbert L. Harris Chair of Economics at GMU and serves as chairman of the Mercatus Center, a research institution that promotes market-oriented analysis of policy issues.

His early research focused on the economics of culture, public goods, and welfare economics. Cowen’s 1998 book In Praise of Commercial Culture argued that markets foster artistic creativity by broadening audiences and increasing opportunities for innovation. Later works explored globalization, philanthropy, and the economics of inequality.

Cowen has written extensively on the economics of cultural consumption and economic growth. His 2011 book The Great Stagnation contended that the U.S. economy’s slower growth stems from a depletion of “low-hanging fruit” such as cheap land, mass education, and technological breakthroughs. The book was discussed across media and academia for reframing debates about innovation and productivity.

Cowen’s later scholarship continued this theme in works such as Average Is Over (2013), which predicted that artificial intelligence and automation would widen income inequality, and Stubborn Attachments (2018), a philosophical defense of long-term economic growth as a moral imperative.

In 2018, Cowen founded Emergent Ventures, an incubator fellowship and grant program housed at the Mercatus Center that supports entrepreneurs and researchers pursuing "zero to one" ideas. The program launched with a $1 million grant from the Thiel Foundation. In 2020, together with Stripe CEO Patrick Collison and UC Berkeley bioengineering professor Patrick Hsu, Cowen spun off Fast Grants from Emergent Ventures to fund COVID-19 research; Fast Grants ultimately raised over $50 million and awarded 260 grants.

== Ideas and public philosophy ==
Cowen’s intellectual work bridges economics, philosophy, and cultural studies. He is associated with the Austrian School and public choice theory. His work departs from orthodox libertarianism through emphasis on social coordination, state capacity, and cultural flourishing.

=== State capacity libertarianism ===
In a 2020 essay, Cowen introduced the term “state capacity libertarianism” to describe a worldview that combines free markets with an effective and competent government. He argued that libertarians should favor a capable state that can provide essential infrastructure, invest in science, and maintain rule of law—all while preserving individual freedom and market dynamism. The concept gained attention across political commentary as a possible synthesis between libertarian and pragmatic governance traditions.

=== Views on innovation and growth ===
Cowen stresses innovation and productivity as moral and economic imperatives. In Stubborn Attachments, he argued that sustained economic growth generates most of humanity’s welfare improvements and should guide long-term policymaking. He often criticizes cultural pessimism and risk aversion, contending that societies thrive when they reward entrepreneurship and intellectual curiosity.

=== Cultural economics and globalization ===
Cowen has written on the interaction between markets and culture. In Creative Destruction (2002), he argued that globalization enhances cultural diversity by enabling cross-border exchange of art, food, and ideas rather than homogenizing them. His writings challenge both cultural protectionism and economic nationalism, asserting that cosmopolitan exchange strengthens cultural vitality.

=== Culture ===
Cowen drew attention to the negative consequences of marijuana legalization, while remaining in favor of legalization.

=== Artificial intelligence ===
Cowen claimed that OpenAI's o3 model was indicative of being AGI. In 2025, he praised the development of AI actresses, in particular Tilly Norwood, without her being adapted to play an actress in any media, including television or film. The article highlighted how she met beauty standards and was a virgin, aspects Cowen found important. The article received backlash by Lyz Lenz and other journalists for Cowen's lack of consideration of the state of the technology and focus on her feminine aesthetic.

== Media and public commentary ==
Cowen is a public economist whose writings and interviews bridge academic economics and mainstream discourse on politics and sociology.

=== Marginal Revolution ===
In August 2003, Cowen and fellow economist Alex Tabarrok launched the blog Marginal Revolution, which became one of the most widely-read economics blogs in the world. The site covers economics, culture, politics, and global development. The Wall Street Journal called it “required reading for anyone serious about economic ideas.”

In addition to daily commentary, Cowen and Tabarrok use the platform to announce academic research, book reviews, and cultural reflections. Their posts have been collected in several anthologies and cited in economic literature for their early discussion of “markets in everything”.

=== Conversations with Tyler ===
Since 2015, Cowen has hosted Conversations with Tyler, a podcast produced by the Mercatus Center that features long-form interviews across areas of economics, philosophy, science, and culture. His guests have included Amartya Sen, Esther Duflo, Margaret Atwood, and Peter Thiel. The show's conversational style and Cowen's deep preparation have been praised for eliciting substantive discussion. The Atlantic described it as "a masterclass in curiosity."

=== Columns and publications ===
Since April 2025, Cowen has written a regular column for The Free Press, having moved there after roughly eight years as a Bloomberg Opinion columnist. He previously wrote the "Economic Scene" column for The New York Times. His essays have also appeared in The Wall Street Journal, Forbes, Newsweek, and other major outlets.

== Reception and influence ==
Cowen has been cited as one of the most prominent public intellectuals translating economic thinking for a broad audience.

Cowen appeared on Foreign Policy's list of "Top 100 Global Thinkers" (2011) and Prospect magazine's "World Thinkers" list at #21 (2015), he was named one of the "Most Influential Economists" by The Economist in 2024. The Financial Times called him "a bridge between the ivory tower and the real world of policy and technology." In 2012, David Brooks called Cowen "one of the most influential bloggers on the right", writing that he is among those who "start from broadly libertarian premises but do not apply them in a doctrinaire way".

== Personal life ==
Cowen is a teetotaler, saying he is "with the Mormons" on alcohol, and "I encourage people to just completely, voluntarily abstain from alcohol and make it a social norm".

== Publications ==
=== Books ===
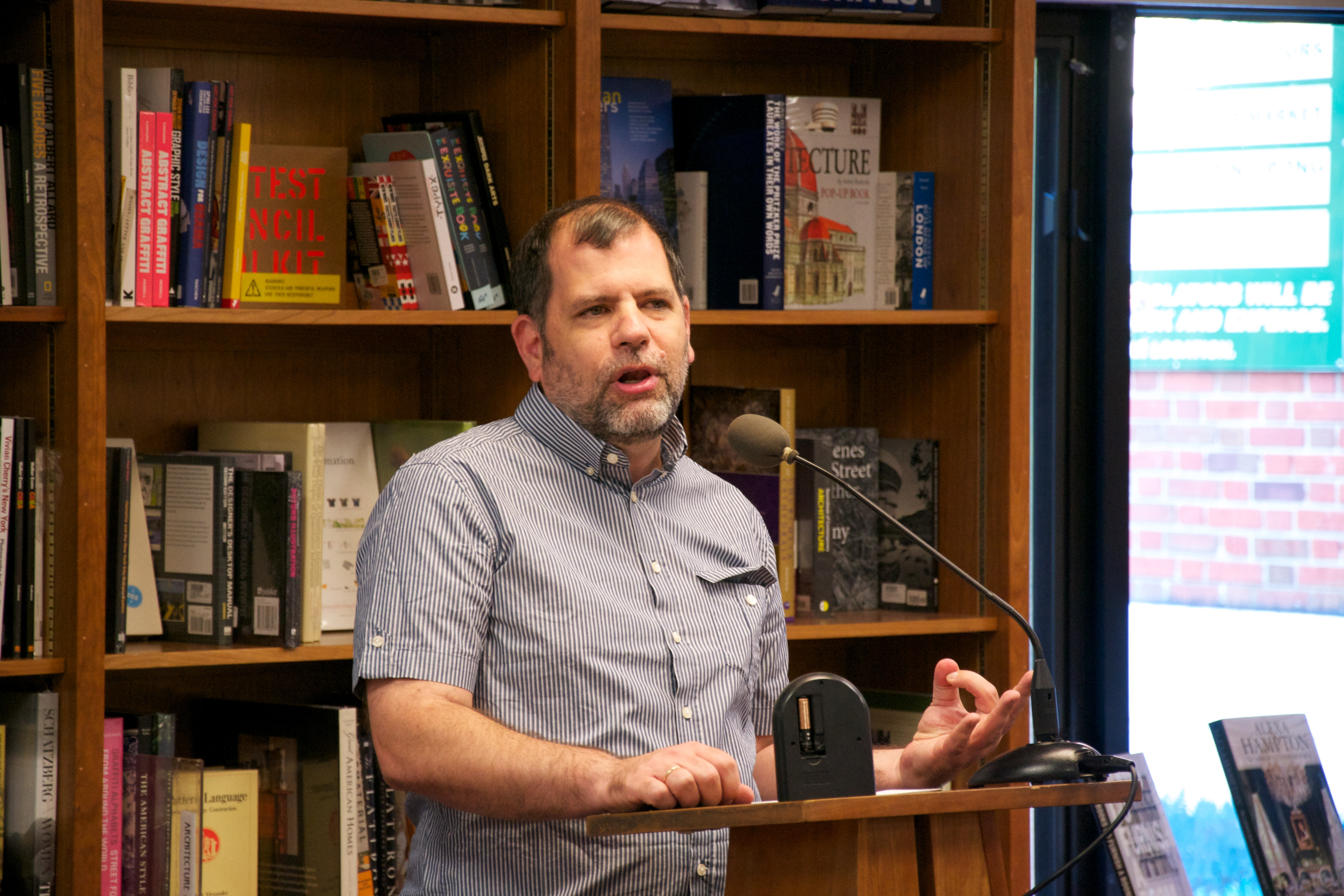
Cowen presenting his 2011 book The Great Stagnation

- Talent: How to Identify Energizers, Creatives, and Winners Around the World, with Daniel Gross. New York: St. Martin's Press, 2022, ISBN 978-1250275813, OCLC 1227086238.
- Big Business: A Love Letter to an American Anti-Hero. New York: St. Martin's Press, 2019. ISBN 978-1250110541, OCLC 1031569569.
- Stubborn Attachments: A Vision for a Society of Free, Prosperous, and Responsible Individuals. Stripe Press. 2018. ISBN 978-1732265134.
- The Complacent Class: The Self-Defeating Quest for the American Dream. New York: St. Martins Press. 2017. ISBN 978-1250108692. OCLC 981982936..
- Average is Over: Powering America Beyond the Age of the Great Stagnation. Dutton Adult. 2013. p. 304. ISBN 978-0525953739. (Wikipedia page)
- With Alex Tabarrok: Modern Principles of Economics (2 ed.). Worth Publishers. 2012. p. 900. ISBN 978-1429239974.
- An Economist Gets Lunch: New Rules for Everyday Foodies. New York: Dutton Adult. 2012. ISBN 978-0525952664. OCLC 839314802.
- The Great Stagnation: How America Ate All the Low-Hanging Fruit of Modern History, Got Sick, and Will (Eventually) Feel Better. Dutton Adult. 2011. ISBN 978-0525952718. OCLC 714718051.
- The Age of the Infovore: Succeeding in the Information Economy (2010)
- Create Your Own Economy: The Path to Prosperity in a Disordered World. Dutton Adult. 2009. ISBN 978-0525951230.
- Discover Your Inner Economist: Use Incentives to Fall in Love, Survive Your Next Meeting, and Motivate Your Dentist. Dutton Adult. 2007. ISBN 978-0525950257.
- Good and Plenty: The Creative Successes of American Arts Funding. Princeton, NJ: Princeton University Press. 2006. ISBN 978-0691120423.
- Markets and Cultural Voices: Liberty vs. Power in the Lives of Mexican Amate Painters (Economics, Cognition, and Society). University of Michigan Press. 2005. ISBN 978-0472068890.
- Creative Destruction: How Globalization Is Changing the World's Cultures. Princeton, NJ: Princeton University Press. 2004. ISBN 978-0691117836.
- What Price Fame?. Cambridge, MA: Harvard University Press. 2002. ISBN 978-0674008090.
- In Praise of Commercial Culture. Cambridge, MA: Harvard University Press. 2000. ISBN 978-0674001886.
- Risk and Business Cycles: New and Old Austrian Perspectives. Psychology Press. 1998. ISBN 978-0415169196.
- Explorations in the New Monetary Economics (1994)
- Public Goods and Market Failures: A Critical Examination (2 ed.). New Brunswick, NJ: Transaction Publishers. 1991. ISBN 978-1560005704.

=== Selected journal articles ===
- Cowen, Tyler (December 22, 2011). "An Economic and Rational Choice Approach to the Autism Spectrum and Human Neurodiversity". GMU Working Paper in Economics. 11 (58). SSRN 1975809.
- Cowen, Tyler (October 7, 2011). "The Microeconomics of Public Choice in Developing Economies: A Case Study of One Mexican Village". The Annual Proceedings of the Wealth and Well-being of Nations. SSRN 1940219.
- Cowen, Tyler; Alexander Tabarrok (October 2000). "An Economic Theory of Avant-Garde and Popular Art, or High and Low Culture". Southern Economic Journal. 67 (2): 232–253. doi:10.2307/1061469. JSTOR 1061469.
- Cowen, Tyler; Amihai Glazer; Katarina Zajc (2000). "Credibility May Require Discretion, Not Rules" (PDF). Journal of Public Economics. 76 (2): 295–306. doi:10.1016/S0047-2727(99)00051-1.
- Cowen, Tyler (August 1997). "Should the Central Bank Target CPI Futures?" (PDF). Journal of Money, Credit and Banking. 29 (3): 275–285. doi:10.2307/2953693. JSTOR 2953693.
- Cowen, Tyler; Daniel Sutter (1997). "Politics and the Pursuit of Fame" (PDF). Public Choice. 93: 19–35. doi:10.1023/A:1017939531594. S2CID 152467126.
- Cowen, T.; Robin Grier (1996). "Do Artists Suffer From A Cost Disease?" (PDF). Rationality and Society. 8 (1): 5–24. doi:10.1177/104346396008001001. S2CID 153392382.
- Cowen, Tyler; Amihai Glazer (1996). "More Monitoring Can Induce Less Effort" (PDF). Journal of Economic Behavior and Organization. 30: 113–123. doi:10.1016/S0167-2681(96)00845-1.
- Cowen, Tyler; Alexander Tabarrok (April 1995). "Good Grapes and Bad Lobsters: Applying the Alchian and Allen Theorem" (PDF). Economic Inquiry. 33 (2): 253–256. doi:10.1111/j.1465-7295.1995.tb01860.x.
- Cowen, Tyler; Randall Kroszner (May 1989). "Scottish Banking before 1845: A Model for Laissez-Faire?". Journal of Money, Credit and Banking. 21 (2): 221–231. doi:10.2307/1992370. JSTOR 1992370.
- Cowen, Tyler; Richard Fink (September 1985). "Inconsistent Equilibrium Constructs: The Evenly Rotating Economy of Mises and Rothbard". American Economic Review. 75 (4): 866–869. JSTOR 1821365.

=== Select articles ===
- Cowen, Tyler (August 11, 2012). "Two Prisms for Looking at China's Problems". New York Times.
- Cowen, Tyler (June 16, 2012). "Broken Trust Takes Time to Mend". New York Times.
- "What Export-Oriented America Means". The American Interest. May–June 2012. Archived from the original on October 21, 2013.
- "Six Rules for Dining Out". The Atlantic. May 2012.
- "6 Ideas for the Ash Heap of History". Foreign Policy. November 28, 2011. Archived from the original on August 16, 2012.
- "The Inequality That Matters". The American Interest. January–February 2011. Archived from the original on October 21, 2013.
- "The Lack of Wars May Be Hurting Economic Growth", NYTimes, June 14, 2014
- Cowen, Tyler (2008). "Arts". In Henderson, David R. (ed.). The Concise Encyclopedia of Economics. Library of Economics and Liberty (2nd ed.). Liberty Fund. pp. 19–21. ISBN 978-0865976665.
