= Crowdcasting =

Intersection of broadcasting and crowdsourcing

Crowdcasting is the combination of broadcasting and crowdsourcing. The process of crowdcasting uses a combination of push and pull strategies first to engage an audience and build a network of participants and then harness the network for new insights. Those insights are then used to shape broadcast programming. These insights and concepts can include new product ideas, new service ideas, new branding messages, or even scientific breakthroughs. These insights are extracted from participants' submissions.

== Push ==
The 'push' aspects of crowdcasting involve a public announcement of a prize for a particular innovation, invention, achievement, or accomplishment (such as the announcement of the Ansari X-Prize in 1996). This stage of crowdcasting serves to engage a specific target audience using compelling offerings or incentives as a call to action.

== Pull ==
The 'pull' aspects of crowdcasting involve building and harnessing a community of passionate participants. Crowdcasting competitions have a viral effect, as interested participants refer others to the event. Once the community is built, it can be harnessed to provide fresh perspectives, ideas, insights, prototypes, or radical breakthrough innovations. InnoCentive is an example. Its challenges tap into a community of over 100,000 scientists who might provide that unexpected innovation.

Openpitch.com an upstart, has embraced the concept of crowdcasting to form a virtual advertising agency. The fundamental concept of crowdcasting—harnessing a specific, often expert, community of participants—separates OpenPitch from user-generated content (UGC) sites. Much like InnoCentive, OpenPitch does not share or post submissions to the overall community during development. Instead, the sites keep user submissions confidential, protecting the intellectual property rights of both the posting company and the solutions provider. What is lost by not following a more open crowdsourcing model is gained by a policy that, arguably, attracts a more professional, dedicated user base.

== Crowdcasting in action ==
Aside from the advertising space, the merger of crowdsourcing with broadcast programming has been largely unexplored. One of the first to launch a "crowdcasting" application allowing listeners to take control of a radio station is LDR / "Listener Driven Radio". "Listener Driven Radio" is a software application that allows listeners to go online, or to their mobile phone, and offer their input into what plays next on the radio station. The program constantly absorbs listener input, song votes, and comments on music and automatically adapts radio station programming in real-time. Clear Channel Communications, Cox Media Group, CBS, Cumulus, Harvard Broadcasting, and many major broadcasters in the USA, Canada, and Europe are using Listener Driven Radio's technology to give audiences the ability to influence on-air programming.

== Internet-based crowdcasting ==
Crowdcasting is also no longer confined to traditional broadcasting platforms due to current technological advances. For instance, there is the case of the Internet-based platforms, which feature convenient and automated capabilities for collecting, storing, and analyzing data. This is demonstrated in the platform created by Salesforce for Starbucks, the crowdsourcing solution enables the coffee chain to source ideas from its customers through suggestions for improvements in their outlets. The same strategy has been employed by companies like Amazon, Philips, LG, and Forbes when they use CrowdSpring to search for new creative ideas. Startups like Elance also integrate crowdcasting into their operations as a value-added service.

The social media is another example of an Internet-based crowdcasting platform. This can be the case once an organization taps it to enable stakeholders to self-organize as a crowd so that content about the organization can be produced and disseminated. Here, the 'push' and 'pull' strategies are employed when engaging a community of stakeholders and building a network of participants ('push'), which is then harnessed to gain insights ('pull').

== Differences ==
John Seely-Brown and John Hagel III discuss the transition from 'push' to 'pull' innovation this way: "Rather than treating producers as passive consumers whose needs can be anticipated and shaped by centralized decision-makers, pull models treat people as networked creators even when they actually are customers purchasing goods and services. Pull platforms harness their participants’ passion, commitment, and desire to learn, thereby creating communities that can improvise and innovate rapidly."

== See also ==
- Broadcasting
- Crowdsourcing
- Narrowcasting
- Open Innovation
