= Michael D. Smith (economist) =

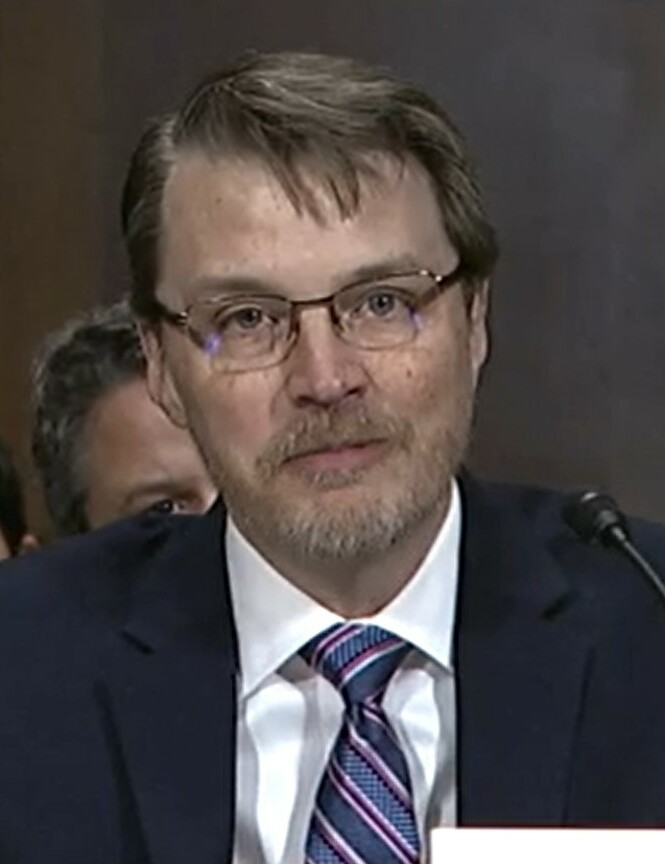
- Smith in 2020

Academic background
- Education: University of Maryland, College Park (BS, MS); Massachusetts Institute of Technology (PhD)

Academic work
- Discipline: Management science Economics; Marketing
- Institutions: Carnegie Mellon University

Michael D. Smith is an American academic who is the J. Erik Jonsson Professor of Information Technology and Marketing at the Heinz College of Carnegie Mellon University with joint-appointment at the Tepper School of Business.

== Education ==
Smith earned a Bachelor of Science in electrical engineering and a Master of Science in telecommunications science from the University of Maryland, College Park. He then received his PhD in management science and information technology from the MIT Sloan School of Management in 2000

== Career ==
Smith’s research uses economic and statistical techniques to analyze firm and consumer behavior in online markets, specifically markets for digital information and digital media products. His research in this area has been published in leading management science, economics, and marketing journals and in leading professional journals, including The Harvard Business Review and The Sloan Management Review. His research has also been covered by press outlets, including The Economist, The Wall Street Journal, The New York Times, Wired, and Business Week. Smith is co-author of the book Streaming, Sharing, Stealing: Big Data and the Future of Entertainment (MIT Press, 2016).

Smith has received several awards for his teaching and research, including the National Science Foundation’s prestigious CAREER Research Award, the 2017 Carol & Bruce Mallen Award for lifetime published scholarly contributions to motion picture industry economic studies, the 2009 and 2004 Best Teacher Awards in Carnegie Mellon's Masters of Information Systems Management program, and the 2018 Dick Wittink Award for the best paper published in the journal Quantitative Marketing and Economics. He was also recently selected as one of the top 100 “emerging engineering leaders in the United States” by the National Academy of Engineering. Smith has served on the editorial boards of a variety of top journals, including as a senior editor at Information Systems Research and as an associate editor at Management Science and Management Information Systems Quarterly.

In 2023, his book The Abundant University: Remaking Higher Education for a Digital World was published by MIT Press.
