= Shane Greenstein =

American economist

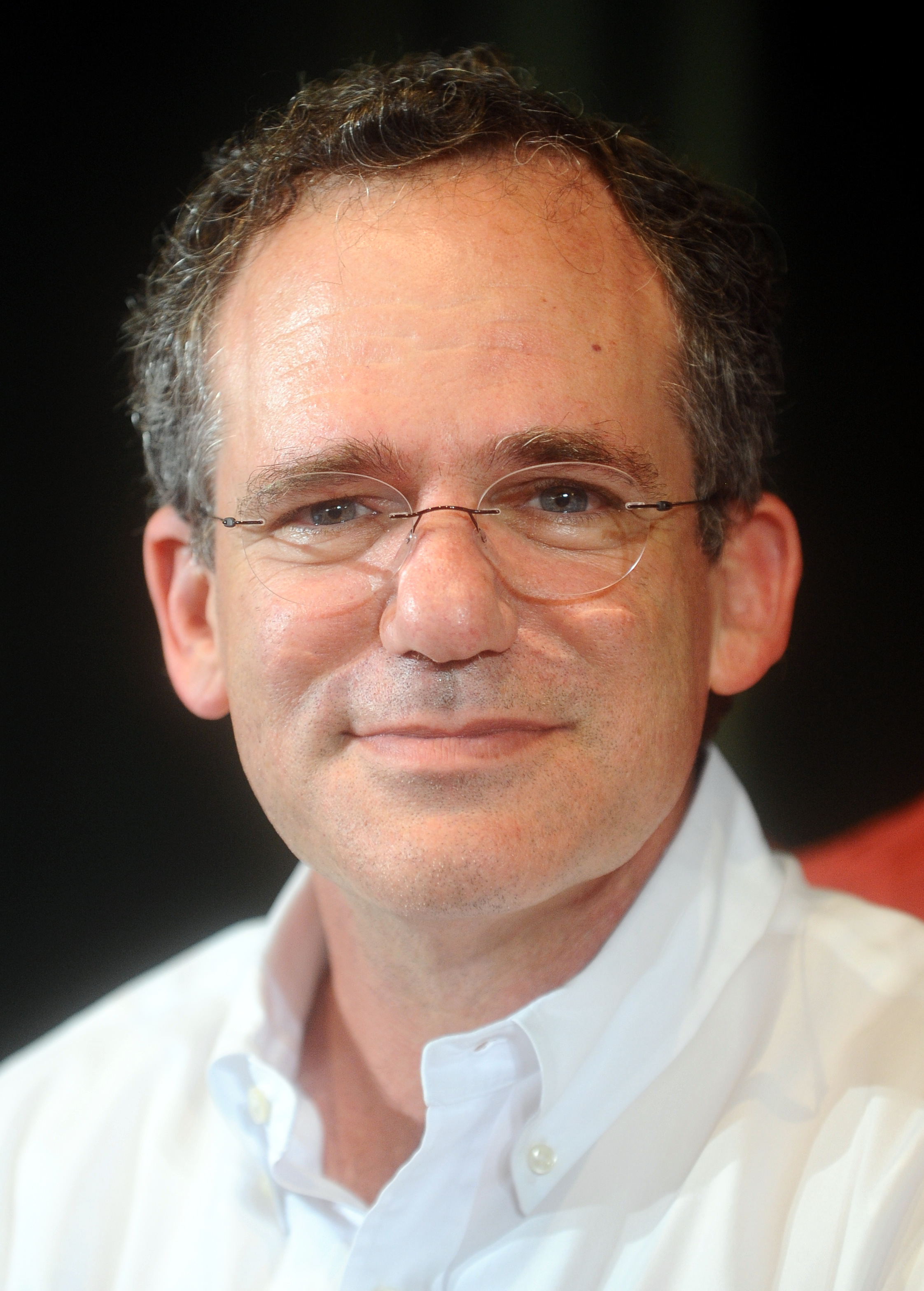
- Shane Greenstein at the Festival of Economics in Trento in 2018
- Education: University of California, Berkeley (BA); Stanford University (PhD)
- Scientific career
- Fields: Economics
- Workplaces: Harvard Business School

Shane Greenstein is an American economist. He is the Martin Marshall Professor of Business Administration at the Harvard Business School. He is the author of two books and the co-editor of three. He has published research about Wikipedia.

== Education ==
Greenstein received his B.A. from the University of California at Berkeley in 1983, and his Ph.D. from Stanford University in 1989, both in economics. He held a post-doctoral fellowship at the Stanford Institute for Economic Policy Research at Stanford in 1989.

== Career ==
Greenstein is a leading researcher in the business economics of computing, communications and Internet infrastructure. His research and writing focus on a variety of topics in this area, including the adoption of client-server systems, the growth of commercial Internet access networks, the industrial economics of platforms, and changes in communications policy. Over a twenty-five-year career he has written and edited eight books, and published over one hundred refereed journal articles and book chapters. He has written over on hundred other articles for policy and business audiences. He is regularly quoted in national and local media. He has been a regular columnist and essayist for IEEE Micro since 1995.

Greenstein was the Program Chair for the Telecommunication Policy Research Conference in 2000 and co-chair with Victor Stango for the conference on Standards and Public Policy, held at the Chicago Federal Reserve Board in 2005. He is a participant in many national research organizations, including National Bureau of Economic Research and Conference on Research, Income and Wealth. As a fellow of Berkman Center for Internet & Society at Harvard University he researches slant and bias in Wikipedia.

Greenstein sits on numerous editorial boards, including Journal of Regulatory Economics, Economics Bulletin, and Information and Economics Policy, and holds or has held several oversight responsibilities, including advisory committee for the U.S. Census, and National Institute for Science and Technology. He also reviews for a wide assortment of major journals in economics and information science, and for a wide assortment of organizations, including the National Science Foundation, and National Academy of Sciences. At Northwestern University he is affiliated with the Center for the Study of Industrial Organization and the Institute for Policy Research. He was chair of the Management and Strategy Department from 2002 to 2005.

Greenstein has published research about Wikipedia. In particular, he has shown that Wikipedia editors who edit about politics become increasingly less partisan.

== Personal life ==
Greenstein is married with four children. His wife, Ranna Rozenfeld, is a pediatric critical care medicine physician at Hasbro Children's Hospital in Providence, RI, after many years at Lurie Children's Hospital in Chicago, IL.

== Books ==
- Shane Greenstein, How the Internet Became Commercial: Innovation, Privatization, and the Birth of a New Network (The Kauffman Foundation Series on Innovation and Entrepreneurship), Princeton University Press. 2015.
- Shane Greenstein and Victor Stango, editors, Standards and Public Policy, Cambridge Press. 2007.
- Shane Greenstein, editor, Computing, Edward-Elgar Press. 2006.
- Shane Greenstein, Diamonds are Forever, Computers are not. Imperial College Press. 2004.
- Lorrie Cranor and Shane Greenstein, editors, MIT Press. 2002. Communications Policy and Information Technology: Promises, Problems, Prospects
- Ben Compaine and Shane Greenstein, editors, MIT Press. 2001. Communications Policy in Transition: The Internet and Beyond
