= List of business terms =

The following terms are in everyday use in financial regions, such as commercial business and the management of large organisations such as corporations.

== Noun phrases ==
| Noun phrase | Definition |
|---|---|
| 30,000 foot view | Program management view |
| 50,000 foot view | Highest management overview |
| Bandwidth | Availability |
| Benchmark | Measuring against |
| Bespoke solution | a solution to a problem one has that is 'tailor-made' (allegedly) |
| Best practice | Tried and tested methodology/process |
| Blue sky thinking | Idealistic or visionary ideas, not always with practical application (source: BBC) |
| Bottleneck | Where a process is held up |
| Cascade | Array of possible actions to take in response to a problem: protocol |
| Check in the box | Complete the task |
| Cross-functional | Works in multiple directions simultaneously |
| Customer-centric | The customer is the main focus |
| Cutting edge practices | Up to date or new methods |
| Dashboard | Collection of key indicators |
| Data Moat | Large amounts of data acquired by an organization that can be harvested for sustainable, differentiating competitive advantage. |
| Deliverable(s) | Finished product or outcome |
| Downsize | Reduce the number of employees through a lay-off |
| End-user perspective | Point of view of a customer about a product or service |
| Evergreen | Content that is always relevant |
| Flavour of the month | The current popular or trending activity |
| Golden handshake | Contract clause which richly rewards a key employee in the case of termination |
| Golden parachute | Contract clause richly (perhaps excessively) rewarding a key executive if termination is due to corporate takeover or merger |
| Hard stop | Deadline |
| Hub | A central idea to which other ideas are linked |
| In the loop | Knowing what's going on and being kept informed |
| In the weeds | Immersed or entangled in details or complexities |
| Joined-up thinking | Discussing the viewpoints of each organization and coming to an agreement or compromise |
| Lay-off | Redundancies on a large scale |
| Learnings | Acquired knowledge after an action/actions or process/processes has been completed |
| Low-hanging fruit | Tasks that have the greatest positive effect for the least effort, used when promoting new projects to show the advantages. |
| Nesting | Processes within processes |
| Off the shelf | Buying in a product or service that is already completed |
| One button to push/Push of a button | Reduced number of suppliers |
| Operational excellence | Sustainable improvement of key performance metrics |
| Python | Challenging problem |
| Raft of measures | A collection of proposals or schemes |
| Rattler | Obvious problem |
| Run it up the flagpole | Test the popularity of a new idea or proposal. |
| Scalability | A small component's ability to grow within a larger system |
| Silo (Vertical and Horizontal) | A system, process, department, etc. that operates in isolation from others. |
| Silver bullet | One solution for everything |
| Six Sigma | A system for process improvement by error reduction |
| Stakeholders | Group or individual affected by the outcome of a decision |
| Talent | Employees |
| Tent pole | The task or item most likely to delay a project or consume the most resources |
| Under-pinning | The foundations of an idea, which helps another related scheme or proposal |
| Unique selling proposition (USP) | Any aspect of an object that differentiates it from similar objects |
| Win-win solution | Providing a product or service which makes everyone happy, particularly both buyer and seller |

== Verb phrases ==
| Verb phrase | Definition |
|---|---|
| Action that | Put something into practice |
| Baked in | Something which has been "baked in" is implied to be impossible to remove. Alternatively, "baked in" can refer to a desirable, although non-essential, property of a product being incorporated for the user's convenience. |
| Boil the ocean | Undertake an impossible or impractical task |
| Buck the trend | To follow an action against market tendencies |
| Build capacity | Take actions which increase the amount of work that can be done in the future. |
| Circle back | Discuss later |
| Circle the wagons | Defensive strategy to provide time to plan or produce a better solution |
| Cover all directions of the compass | Ensure the product specification covers everything |
| Create the storyboard | Outline what the solution will look like |
| Deep dive | Get into the detail |
| Drill down | Investigate in depth |
| Flogging a dead horse | Wasting efforts |
| Have the vendor in our pocket | Keep a vendor/contractors paid |
| Ideate | Come up with ideas |
| Land and expand | To sell a small solution and then grow it within the client's environment |
| Make hay | Productive or successful in a short time |
| Moving forward | Making progress on an idea or scheme |
| Move the goal posts | Change the criteria for success |
| Pick the low-hanging fruit | Go (initially) for the easiest options |
| Power to the elbow | Get additional backup information to make your case stronger |
| Pull the plug | Close a venture that is losing money or has no prospects of success |
| Punt | Relinquish responsibility |
| Pushing the envelope | Going outside normal boundaries to achieve a target or goal (such as exceeding specifications) |
| Put this on your radar | Consider this |
| Scrub the numbers | Find errors |
| Sing from the same hymn sheet | Show a united front, or everyone understanding and saying the same thing to clientele. |
| Table the conversation | Reconvene at a later time |
| Test the water | 'Put your toe' into a market to determine its temperature. |
| Touch base | To meet up with a colleague to discuss progress (from baseball) |
| Touch base offline | Meet and talk |
| Tranch up the workload | Divide responsibilities |
| Trim the fat | Cut excess budgets, remove avoidable costs |
| Unscramble that egg | Take care of that mess |

== See also ==
- Buzzwords
- Corporate communication
- Corporate jargon
- Doublespeak
- Euphemism
- Obfuscation
