= Andrew McAfee =

American digital technology research scientist (born 1967)

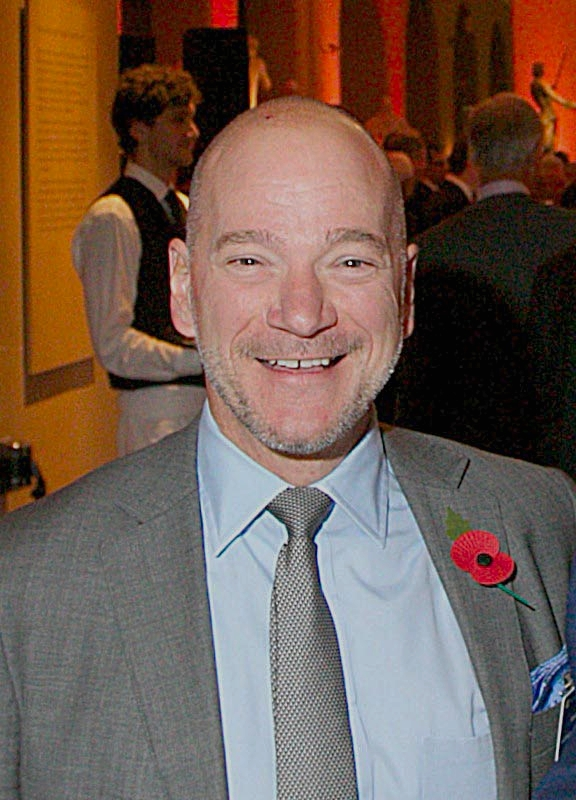
- McAfee in 2014
- Born: Andrew Paul McAfee c. 1967
- Education: Harvard Business School, MIT
- Years active: 1990s–present
- Website: andrewmcafee.org

Andrew Paul McAfee (born c. 1967) is a research scientist at MIT and cofounder and codirector of the MIT Initiative on the Digital Economy at the MIT Sloan School of Management. He studies how digital technologies are changing the world.

== Early life and education ==
McAfee grew up in a small town in the Midwest. His parents divorced when he was eleven years old. Having a lack of friends growing up, and from being what he has called "socially awkward" and a bit of a math and English geek, McAfee was drawn to computers.

McAfee received his doctorate from Harvard Business School and completed two bachelors and two masters of science degrees at MIT.

== Work ==
Throughout his career, McAfee has written and co-written several books on digital technology and related topics. He speaks frequently to both academic and industry audiences, most notably at TED 2013 and on The Charlie Rose Show.

=== Books ===
McAfee's first book, Enterprise 2.0: New Collaborative Tools for Your Organization's Toughest Challenges, brings together case studies and examples with key concepts from economics, sociology, computer science, consumer psychology, and management studies of how leading organizations are incorporating the web's novel tools and philosophies.

His second book, Race Against the Machine: How the Digital Revolution is Accelerating Innovation, Driving Productivity, and Irreversibly Transforming Employment and the Economy, co-authored with Erik Brynjolfsson, brings together a range of data, examples, and research to show that the average US worker is being left behind by advances in technology.

In September 2014, he co-authored the book Leading Digital – Turning Technology into Business Transformation, with George Westermann (MIT) and Didier Bonnet (Capgemini Consulting).

In 2016 and 2018 McAfee cowrote two more books with Brynjolfsson, titled The Second Machine Age: Work, Progress, and Prosperity in a Time of Brilliant Technologies and Machine, Platform, Crowd: Harnessing Our Digital Future respectively.

In October 2019, Scribner published More from Less: The Surprising Story of How We Learned to Prosper Using Fewer Resources — and What Happens Next.

== Bibliography ==
- Enterprise 2.0: New Collaborative Tools for Your Organization's Toughest Challenges (2009) ISBN 9781422125878
- Race Against the Machine: How the Digital Revolution is Accelerating Innovation, Driving Productivity, and Irreversibly Transforming Employment and the Economy with Erik Brynjolfsson (2012) ISBN 9780984725113
- Leading Digital: Turning Technology into Business Transformation with George Westermann (2014) ISBN 9781625272478
- The Second Machine Age: Work, Progress, and Prosperity in a Time of Brilliant Technologies with Erik Brynjolfsson (2016) ISBN 9780393350647
- Machine, Platform, Crowd: Harnessing Our Digital Future with Erik Brynjolfsson (2018) ISBN 9780393356069
- More from Less: The Surprising Story of How We Learned to Prosper Using Fewer Resources — and What Happens Next (2019) ISBN 9780805095111
- The Geek Way: The Radical Mindset That Drives Extraordinary Results (2023) Macmillan Business, ISBN 978-1-0350-2617-3
