= Fixed pie fallacy =

Fixed-pie fallacy can refer to:

- commonly, the zero-sum bias that there is a fixed amount of wealth in the world
- less commonly, the lump of labour fallacy that there is a fixed amount of work to be done in the world
