= Win–win game =

Game theory scenario

In game theory, a win–win game or win–win scenario is a situation that produces a mutually beneficial outcome for two or more parties. It is also called a positive-sum game as it is the opposite of a zero-sum game. If a win–win scenario is not achieved, the scenario becomes a win-lose or lose–lose situation, since it has caused failure for at least one of the parties.

While she did not coin the term, Mary Parker Follett's process of integration described in her book Creative Experience (Longmans, Green & Co., 1924) forms the basis of what we now refer to as the idea of "win-win" conflict resolution. An example of a win-win scenario is trade, since both parties end up with a good or service they value more, making both participants better off.

== See also ==
- Abundance mentality
- Game
- Cooperative game
- Group-dynamic game
- Lump of labour fallacy
- No-win situation
- Zero-sum thinking
