= Vivarelli =

Vivarelli is a surname. Notable people with the surname include:

- Carlo Vivarelli (1919–1986), Swiss artist and graphic designer
- Debora Vivarelli (born 1993), Italian table tennis player
- Marco Vivarelli (born 1963), Italian economist
- Nico Vivarelli (born 1986), Italian Grand Prix motorcycle racer
- Piero Vivarelli (1927–2010), Italian film director, screenwriter, and lyricist

== See also ==
- Palazzo Vivarelli Colonna, historic building in Italy
