= George and Mary Foster Anthropology Library =

Library of the University of California, Berkeley

The George and Mary Foster Anthropology Library
- 37.869843°N 122.255285°W
- Established: 1956

Collection
- Size: 80,000 (volumes)

Access and use
- Population served: 43,000 Cal faculty, staff and students in addition to the Bay Area

Other information
- Director: Celia Emmelhainz (librarian)
- Employees: 3 (1 librarians; 2 staff; 10+ student employees)
- Website: www.lib.berkeley.edu/libraries/anthropology-library

The George and Mary Foster Anthropology Library is one of the subject specialty libraries at University of California, Berkeley, and is one of only three anthropology libraries at American research universities. The library supports the University of California, Berkeley anthropology department.

== History ==
The Anthropology Museum and anthropology department at UC Berkeley were founded in 1901, followed by a small departmental library established before 1909.

Yet "when I came to Berkeley in 1948, there was no Anthropology Library,” professor John Rowe wrote. Rowe found it difficult to access anthropology books scattered throughout the Main library, and so established a one-room anthropology library in the department's new temporary quarters. The two-floor anthropology library was eventually established in Kroeber Hall in 1959.

According to LibraryThing, the library was established in 1956 as a separate branch.

=== Renaming ===
The UC Berkeley anthropology library was renamed after Berkeley anthropologists George and Mary Foster in 1997.

=== Occupy Cal in the Anthropology Library, 2012 ===
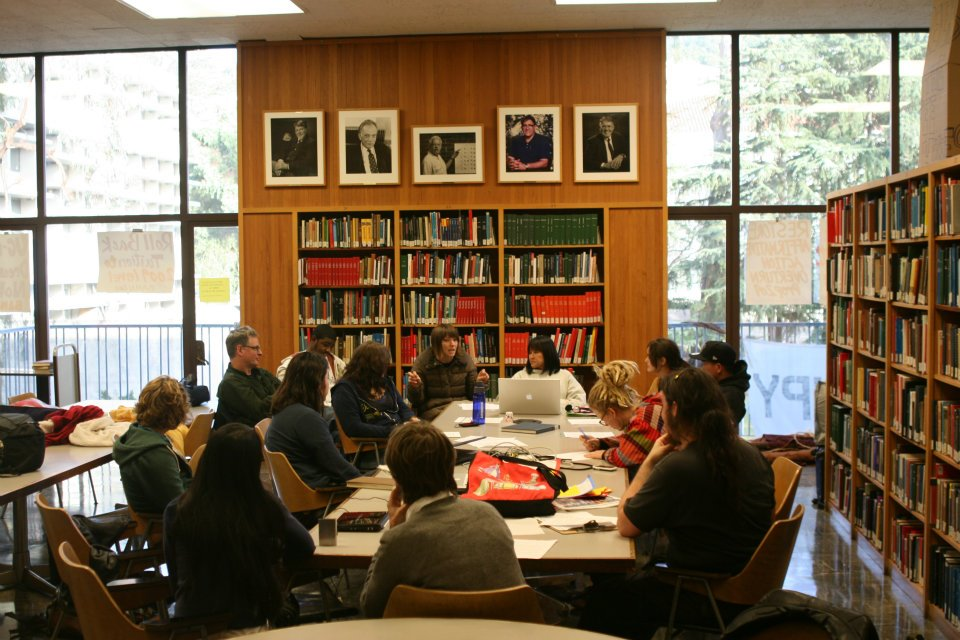
Occupy Cal writing their resolution to send to the administration to reinstate anthropology library hours and services.

On January 17, 2012, a proposal was brought to the Occupy Cal General Assembly to occupy the library due to a decision by administration to reduce the library's hours and services. Part of the overall trend of privatization and divestment in public resources, the university has reduced spending on its libraries by 12 percent since 2012. With mass approval by the General Assembly, members of Occupy Cal decided to lead a study-in of the anthropology library on January 19 to demand the reinstatement of the library's hours and resources.

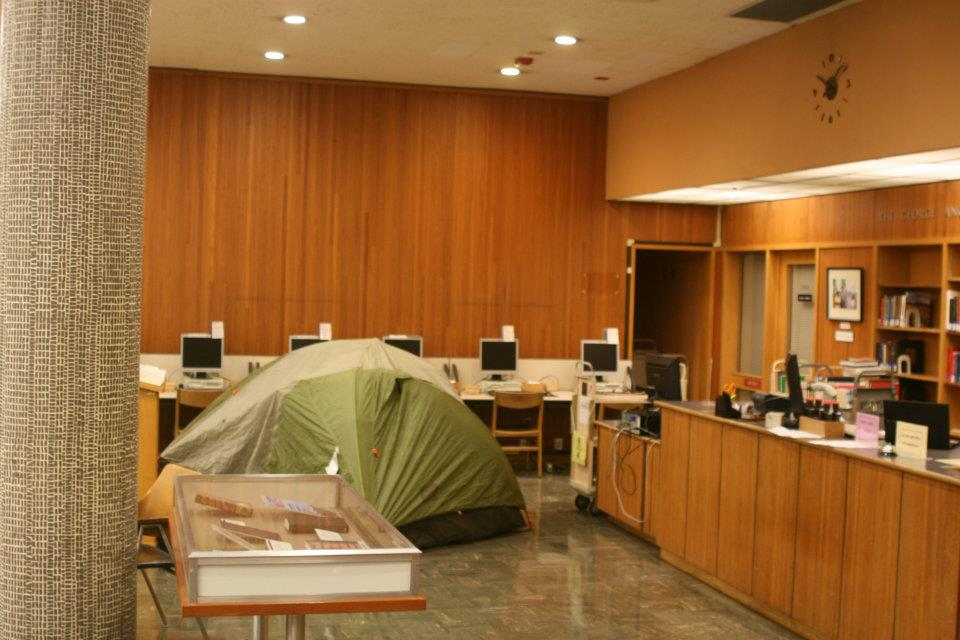
Occupy Cal occupied UC Berkeley's anthropology library for 3 days following cuts to library hours and resources.

On January 19, 2012, following a noon-time rally by the larger Occupy Cal community, a group of roughly 100 students, faculty, and staff occupied the anthropology library and sent their demands to the administration. The non-violent study-in lasted 3 days and 2 nights, and involved several email exchanges between administration, and students and faculty.

On January 21, 2012, the occupiers were notified by the administration that their demands would be met: library hours would be reinstated, and a replacement job would be created to achieve regular access to the library.

=== Protests at the Anthropology Library, 2022 ===
On February 28, 2022, the UC Berkeley Library announced that it was closing the Foster Anthropology Library indefinitely, due to "severe and sustained staffing shortages." This decision was reversed after 40 students and faculty organized to protest the closure, although "a librarian will no longer be available. Students will not be able to check out materials or receive research assistance."

== Collections ==
As of 2009, the Anthropology Library has over 80,000 volumes of books and bound journals., comparable to Harvard's Tozzer Anthropology Library, which now holds 80,000 volumes, and more off-site.

The Foster Library collects books in the four fields of anthropology, including cultural anthropology, biological anthropology, linguistic anthropology, and archaeology, especially on California and Latin American populations.

== Librarians ==
An anonymous donor endowed the John H. Rowe Librarian position in the anthropology library in 1998.

- Alfred L. Kroeber
- Pliny Earle Goddard ( -1909)
- John Howland Rowe (1950s)
- Dorothy A. Koenig (1972-1994)
- Suzanne Calpestri (1994-2008)
- Kathleen Gallagher (2008-2012)
- Susan Edwards (2013-2015)
- Celia Emmelhainz (2015-2022)

== See also ==
- Tozzer Library
- Phoebe A. Hearst Museum of Anthropology
- Peabody Museum of Archaeology and Ethnology
- University of Pennsylvania Museum of Archaeology and Anthropology
