= Eurasian Business Review =

Academic journal

- Discipline: Business Administration
- Language: English
- Edited by: Marco Vivarelli

Publication details
- History: 2011–present
- Publisher: Springer Nature on behalf of the Eurasia Business and Economics Society
- Frequency: Quarterly
- Open access: Hybrid
- Impact factor: 2.222 (2019)

Standard abbreviations
- ISO 4: Eurasian Bus. Rev.

Indexing
- ISSN: 1309-4297 (print); 2147-4281 (web)
- LCCN: 2019204521
- OCLC no.: 939121788

Links
- Journal homepage; Online access

The Eurasian Business Review: A Journal in Industrial Organization, Innovation and Management Science is a quarterly peer-reviewed academic journal covering all aspects of business administration related to the Eurasian region. It was established in 2011 and, along with the Eurasian Economic Review, is an official journal of the Eurasia Business and Economics Society. The society publishes it in association with Springer Nature and the editor-in-chief is Marco Vivarelli.

== Abstracting and indexing ==
The journal is abstracted and indexed in:

- Current Contents/Social And Behavioral Sciences
- EBSCO databases
- EconLit
- International Bibliography of Periodical Literature
- International Bibliography of the Social Sciences
- ProQuest databases)
- Social Sciences Citation Index
- Scopus
