= Calum Chace =

British businessman and author (born 1959)

- Chace in 2026
- Born: Calum Chace; March 20, 1959 (age 67)
- Education: Oxford University
- Occupations: Businessman; author; speaker
- Years active: 1981
- Children: 1
- Website: calum-chace.com

Calum Chace (born 1959) is an English businessman, author and speaker, who specialises in artificial intelligence. After a thirty-year career in business, he retired in 2012 to focus on writing and speaking on the topic of AI, which he saw as both a hugely promising development, and a potential threat that warrants urgent attention. In 2024 he co-founded the AI safety company Conscium.

== Education ==
Chace studied philosophy, politics, and economics (PPE) at Oxford University, graduating in 1981. Between 1989 and 1990, he went on to gain an MBA from Cranfield School of Management.

== Journalist and Business Career ==
After graduating from Oxford in 1981, Chace worked at the BBC as a journalist for two years, before embarking on a career in business, working for companies such as KPMG and BP. He initially worked in marketing, then after gaining an MBA spent 15 years in strategy consultancy. The last five years of his career were spent as a commercial director and as a CEO. In his own time, Chace co-authored two business books during his business career, and published the occasional article, such as for the Financial Times.

== Writer and speaker ==
In 2012, Chace largely retired from business to focus on writing and speaking, focusing on artificial intelligence. Like many who work in the field of AI, he got into it via science fiction, which he calls "philosophy in fancy dress". In common with many futurists, but unlike most mainstream commentators at the time, he saw AI as a technology likely to have a huge impact on humanity well before the GenAI boom of the 2020s got underway. He has published both non-fiction and fictional AI themed books, given talks on all six continents, and published many articles. Chace writes from a pro-capitalist and pro-reason perspective, agreeing with Steven Pinker's view that "Industrial capitalism launched the Great Escape from universal poverty in the 19th century and is rescuing the rest of humankind in a Great Convergence in the 21st". His view on AI is broadly optimistic; in a variation of the FALC concept popularised by Aaron Bastani, Chace predicted in 2015 that AI could bring about "fully automated luxury capitalism". Chace has nevertheless long warned that AI poses risks if not handled carefully; foremost among these are what he calls the "two singularities".

Chace popularised and may have coined the term "economic singularity" to describe the possibility of severe technological unemployment arising as a result of AI. He argues the unemployment risk can be mitigated by policy responses such as a generous form of universal basic income, new models of broad asset ownership so the gains from automation are widely shared, and a cultural shift away from defining human worth through paid employment. Despite Chace's strong faith in the free market, he holds that eventually AI & robotics will become so productive, that they will significantly reduce social mobility for humans outside of the most talented or capital owning elite. By this point, responses like Basic Income will be insufficient to prevent problems arising from social stratification, so he holds humanity should plan for an eventual move beyond capitalism, to something like the Star Trek economy. In 2017, Chace co-founded the Economic Singularity Club, to further discuss such concerns with technologists, academics and interested writers.

The second major theme in his books is the technological singularity, which for Chace involves AI achieving first human level (AGI) and then beyond-human (SGI) intelligence. His debut novel Pandora's Brain (2014) dramatises this scenario, while Surviving AI (2015) sets out the safety case in non-fiction form. Chace argues the right mix of technical alignment work, sensible regulation, and informed public debate gives humanity a strong chance of a flourishing post-AGI future.

Other themes common in both Chace's books and short form content include the urgency of preparing for transformative AI now rather than later, the inadequacy of incremental thinking in the face of exponential change per Amara's law, and the conviction that, handled wisely, AI could be the best thing ever to happen to humanity.

=== Publications ===
Books	Published year	Author(s)
The Internet Consumer Bible	2000	Tess Read, Calum Chace & Simon Rowe
The Internet Start-Up Bible	2000	Tess Read, Calum Chace & Simon Rowe
Pandora's Brain	2014	Calum Chace
Surviving AI: The Promise and Peril of Artificial Intelligence	2015	Calum Chace
The Economic Singularity: Artificial intelligence and Fully Automated Luxury Capitalism	2016	Calum Chace
Artificial Intelligence and the Two Singularities	2018	Calum Chace
Stories from 2045	2019	Calum Chace (editor)
Pandora's Oracle	2021	Calum Chace

== Conscium ==
In 2024, Chace and four other co-founders launched Conscium, an AI safety company led by CEO Daniel Hulme. In February 2025 Conscium published an open letter warning of the risks of AI suffering if care is not taken to mitigate against that possibility when and if AI becomes conscious. Signatories of the letter included Stephen Fry, Karl Friston and Anthony Finkelstein. In March 2025 the Conscium team launched PRISM (Partnership for Research Into Sentient Machines), a non-profit organisation dedicated to investigating AI consciousness.
