= Mary LeCron Foster =

American linguist

Mary LeCron Foster (February 1, 1914 – December 9, 2001) was an American anthropological linguist, who spent most of her working life at the Department of Anthropology at the University of California, Berkeley. Foster carried out graduate work in anthropology under the direction of Ruth Benedict. The influence of Franz Boas, whom she also knew at Columbia, may be seen in Foster's interests in symbolism and language origins. In addition to writing grammars of Sierra Popoluca and Purépecha, she published several articles purporting to reconstruct spoken Primordial Language (PL). PL, she maintained, was constructed out of speech sounds she dubbed ‘phememes’ that were at the same time roots, whose meaning was motivated by the shaping and movement of the vocal tract.

In the 1980s Foster was instrumental in developing anthropological peace and security studies. She co-organized with Robert A. Rubinstein the four days of coordinated symposia on the anthropology of peace held at the 1983 World Congress of Anthropological and Ethnological Sciences in Vancouver, Canada. Those symposia led to the creation of the Commission on Peace and Human Rights of the International Union of Anthropological and Ethnological Sciences. She co-edited the book resulting from those symposia, and a second book deriving from the work of the Commission. From the mid-1980s to the year before her death Foster was a member of the board of directors of the Ploughshares Fund, within which she established the Cowles Fund dedicated to advancing work on the understanding and resolution of violence.

She was married to fellow Berkeley anthropologist George Foster. In 1997 the U.C. Berkeley Anthropology Library was renamed the George and Mary Foster Anthropology Library in their honor.

== Publications ==
- The Tarascan language, 1965
- Symbol as sense : new approaches to the analysis of meaning, 1980
- Peace and war : cross-cultural perspectives, 1985
- The Life of symbols, 1990
- Finding the themes : family, anthropology, language origins, peace and conflict, 2001
