= Limited good =

Belief that the amount available for distribution is limited

In anthropology, limited good is the theory commonly held in traditional societies that there is a limited amount of "good" to go around. In other words, the amount of land, money, etc. available is held to be finite, so every time one person profits, another loses.

Societies that subscribe to this philosophy tend to display strong levels of equality among members and to be strongly resistant to social change.

The term was coined by George M. Foster in his 1965 article, "Peasant Society and the Image of Limited Good", in the American Anthropologist. The concept has been described by Allen as the rural counterpart of the culture of poverty. The Mexican peasants (in Tzintzuntzan, Michoacán) Foster studied were seen by him to lack interest in new opportunities because of their perception of the world as a "competitive game." This led to a high level of distrust and envy, and fragile and constantly shifting patterns of alignment.

== See also ==
- Fixed pie fallacy
- Zero-sum bias

== Sources ==
- Foster, George M. (1965) Peasant Society and the Image of Limited Good, American Anthropologist New Series, Vol. 67, No. 2, Apr., pp. 293–315
- Kennedy, John G. (1966) Peasant Society and the Image of Limited Good": A Critique, American Anthropologist New Series, Vol. 68, No. 5, Oct., pp. 1212–1225
