= Phememe =

Linguistic function

A phememe (from Ancient Greek wikt:φημί ‘I speak, say’) is a hypothesized speech sound with an abstract gestural meaning, proposed by the linguist Mary LeCron Foster.

According to Foster, phememes were the fundamental building block of the earliest human spoken language (Primordial Language), as opposed to the phonemes of attested languages, contemporary or historical. The phememe concept is thus important in the debate regarding the gestural origin of speech. By way of an example, the sound [m], as a meaningful oral gesture, is understood as pointing to “two opposed surfaces in tapering, pressing together, holding together, crushing, or resting against”. Reflexes of this primordial [m], and its original meaning, are found in ostensibly unrelated present-day languages in words referring to the mouth, the female genitals, and semantic extensions of these, e.g. Latin mugio ‘to moo, bugle’, mutus ‘mute’, mucus ‘mucous’, Japanese mugon ‘silence, muteness’, Dravidian muka- ‘face, mouth’, Piro (Arawak) musi- ‘to be pregnant, impregnate’. According to her most recent published work, Foster proposes that the phememic system of primordial spoken language consisted of the following phememes.

Consonant phememes of Primordial Language
	Labial	Dental	Alveopalatal	Velar	Laryngeal
Resonants	m	n	l		
	bilateral	internal	unconstrained		
Stops	p	t	c	k	ʔ
	projective	introjective	extrinsic	divergent	discontinuous
Glides	w		y		h
	curvate		linear		continuous

The philosopher Maxine Sheets-Johnstone makes extensive use of Foster's concept of the phememe in arguing iconicity to be the foundation of the symbolic process. Earl R. Anderson points out that the phememe is thus an elaboration of earlier theories postulating a role for oral gesture in the origin of spoken language, such as those of the naturalist Alfred Russel Wallace and the anthropologist Edward Burnett Tylor, who called his method generative philology. An implication of the phememe hypothesis is that Primordial Language lacked double articulation, which the American linguist Charles F. Hockett proposed as a central design feature of human language. According to this principle, linguistic signs are made up of building blocks, such as phonemes, which are themselves meaningless, e.g. cat is composed of the phonemes /k/, /æ/ and /t/. Phememes came to be desemanticized and replaced by meaningless phonemes in later evolution. The anthropologist Gordon Hewes proposes that this shift was motivated by the advantages phonemes entail in rapid word retrieval.
