= Occupy Cal =

Protest group against economic inequality

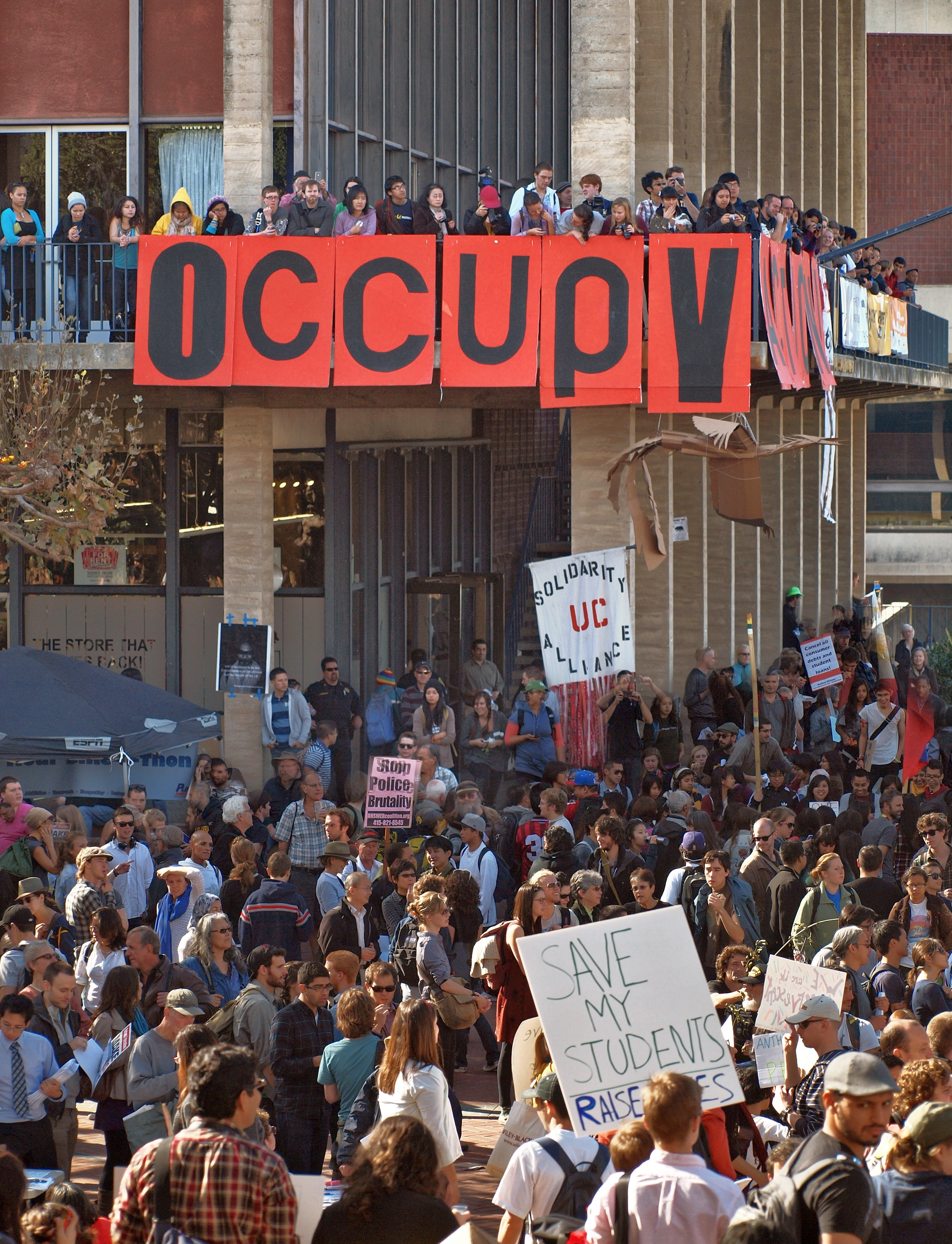
Occupy Cal, November 15, 2011

Occupy Cal included a series of demonstrations that began on November 9, 2011, on the University of California, Berkeley campus in Berkeley, California. It was allied with the Occupy Wall Street movement in New York City, San Francisco Bay Area Occupy groups such as Occupy Oakland, Occupy Berkeley, and Occupy San Francisco, and other public California universities. "Cal" in the name "Occupy Cal" is the nickname of the Berkeley campus and generally refers specifically to UC Berkeley.

One stated focus of Occupy Cal demonstrations is the role of education in job creation and societal well-being. Tuition increases for students, mandatory furloughs for professors and staff, firings or forced realignment of lower-ranking workers as part of the "Operational Excellence" reorganization, and raises for the highest-paid administrators have further fueled discontent.

Occupy Cal continued to engage in organized meetings, events and actions through March 2012.

== Background ==
Budget cuts, tuition increases, and unpaid furlough days affecting public California universities have been the target of protests by UC Berkeley students, faculty, and employees in recent years. The UC Regents has approved increased tuition fees nine times in seven years. In September 2009, several thousand students, faculty, and employees converged on Sproul Plaza to protest a proposed tuition increase of 32%. Simultaneous protests on the University of California and California State University campuses occurred throughout the state. The statewide campus protests did not sway the UC Regents, however, and the 32% tuition increase was approved in November 2009, setting off another round of protests that included the temporary occupation of campus buildings. Protests continued through 2010 and 2011 with Occupy Cal being the most recent iteration of a multi-year protest for affordable public education. UC Berkeley has a long history of student activism. Berkeley spearheaded the Free Speech Movement in 1964 and was a leader in the opposition to the Vietnam War throughout the 1960s.

== Timeline ==
=== November 9 protest and police response ===
External videos
- Police response to Occupy Cal protesters on YouTube, Nov 9

On November 9, 2011, students and professors at UC Berkeley participated in a series of "teach-outs" around campus, a noon rally and march. Approximately 1,500 demonstrators attended the day's events. The march route included a Bank of America location adjacent to campus. Not long after demonstrators set up seven tents in front of Upper Sproul Plaza in the mid-afternoon, law enforcement officials from UC Berkeley Police, the Alameda County Sheriff's Office and other UC Police officers in riot gear arrived to remove the tents. Protesters linked arms to form a human chain in front of the tents to prevent officers from dismantling the encampment. Police used 36-inch riot batons to "jab" and push back the protesters and to break the human chain.

Video footage of the afternoon confrontation shows police using batons and dragging two protesters by the hair, one of whom was UC Berkeley English professor Celeste Langan. 39 protesters, including Professor Langan, were arrested for charges including "resisting and delaying a police officer in the performance of their duties and failure to disperse when given a dispersal order." Robert Hass, a UC Berkeley professor of poetry and former United States Poet Laureate, wrote about the police response in a November 19 New York Times opinion piece entitled "Poet-Bashing Police":

The deputies in the cordon surged forward and, using their clubs as battering rams, began to hammer at the bodies of the line of students. It was stunning to see. They swung hard into their chests and bellies. Particularly shocking to me — it must be a generational reaction — was that they assaulted both the young men and the young women with the same indiscriminate force. If the students turned away, they pounded their ribs. If they turned further away to escape, they hit them on their spines.

Hass himself was hit in the ribs by a police officer wielding a baton. His wife Brenda Hillman was shoved to the ground by a police officer.

=== Reactions ===
==== UC Berkeley administration and police ====
In response to questions about the officer's use of force, UC Police Captain Margo Bennett stated:

The individuals who linked arms and actively resisted, that in itself is an act of violence.

Robert Birgeneau, UC Berkeley Chancellor, George Breslauer, Executive Vice Chancellor and Provost, and Harry Le Grande, Vice Chancellor for Student Affairs initially released a "Message to the Campus Community" in which they stated, "It is unfortunate that some protesters chose to obstruct the police by linking arms and forming a human chain to prevent the police from gaining access to the tents". They described the protesters’ actions as not meeting the criteria for non-violent civil disobedience." The administrators also stated, "We regret that, given the instruction to take down tents and prevent encampment, the police were forced to use their batons to enforce the policy. We regret all injuries, to protesters and police, that resulted from this effort. The campus's Police Review Board will ultimately determine whether police used excessive force under the circumstances."

Following media criticism and statements of disapproval from the university community and academic departments Chancellor Birgeneau released a further "Message regarding events on campus" in which he stated, "I returned to Berkeley yesterday after a week-long trip to Seoul, Tokyo and Shanghai where we successfully advanced some important new partnerships that will benefit our campus... While away, I remained in intermittent contact with Provost George Breslauer and other members of our leadership team and was kept informed, as much as possible, about the Occupy Cal activities on campus. However, it was only yesterday that I was able to look at a number of the videos that were made of the protests on November 9. These videos are very disturbing. The events of last Wednesday are unworthy of us as a university community." Birgeneau also stated, "We cannot condone any excessive use of force against any members of our community," and granted amnesty to students involved in the protests. Some members of the university community expressed skepticism regarding Birgeneau's statement about video access.

Police Review Board (PRB) released a report on May 29, 2012, reflecting on the events of November 9. They make it very clear that this is not something they typically do, but given the circumstances and the request of the chancellor to look into the case, the PRB was forced to investigate. They collected a variety of evidence and conducted interviews with key players to understand the scope of the events. They concluded that not all instances of police conduct were consistent with campus norms, and were disturbed by the inappropriate use of batons against students and faculty. The PRB noted the potential for deviations from police conduct standards even with comprehensive training. They encouraged Berkeley campus police and leaders to review their report so as to better understand the scope of their actions and make future improvements to how they handle protests.

BAMN, a civil rights advocacy organization, promotes action 'By Any Means Necessary' and they responded to the PRB review strongly. BAMN wrote an article in which they proposed that the PRB should be boycotted now and in the future because they have a conflict of interest. This is a conflict of interest because they claim that the board is appointed by and answers to Chancellor Birgeneau, which would in turn taint their unbiased review.

==== UC faculty and students ====
The ASUC, UC Berkeley's Student Government, was "outraged by the brutal tactics used by the UCPD against students." With support from other student governments including UC Davis, Brown, and Harvard, the ASUC, UC Berkeley's student government, passed a resolution condemning the police brutality against students on the November 9 Day of Action. The ASUC has worked to raise awareness of issues such as police brutality highlighted by the Occupy incident. In a packed auditorium at International House, Berkeley's Academic Senate also considered a resolution, which would have expressed no confidence in Birgeneau and other senior campus administrators, but the resolution failed. While much of the energy of Occupy dissipated during the campus winter vacation, subsequent encampments have been set up as recently as mid-February 2012 outside the International House at the corner of Bancroft and Piedmont.

The Department of Integrative Biology stated, "We are deeply disturbed by the images of violence against members of the campus community, as well as the justification and defense of these acts that followed" The School of Social Welfare issued an open letter to the campus community stating, "We are outraged and appalled by the violent silencing of UC Berkeley student voices." 70 faculty of the School of Law condemned the police action and called for "a re-establishment of the campus's reputation as a beacon of free speech". 2,363 faculty and staff stated, "We express no confidence in the willingness of the Chancellor, and other leaders of the UC Berkeley administration, to respond appropriately to student protests, to secure student welfare, and to respect freedom of speech and assembly on the Berkeley campus."

==== Other reactions ====
Former Secretary of Labor Robert Reich responded to the Occupy Cal movement by saying that he believed inequality is bad for everyone. Reich says that Median households are dropping, adjusted for inflation, and is worried about where people are going to get the money to keep the economy going. If there isn't money for the middle class to spend the economy will hurt across the board.

=== General strike on November 15 ===
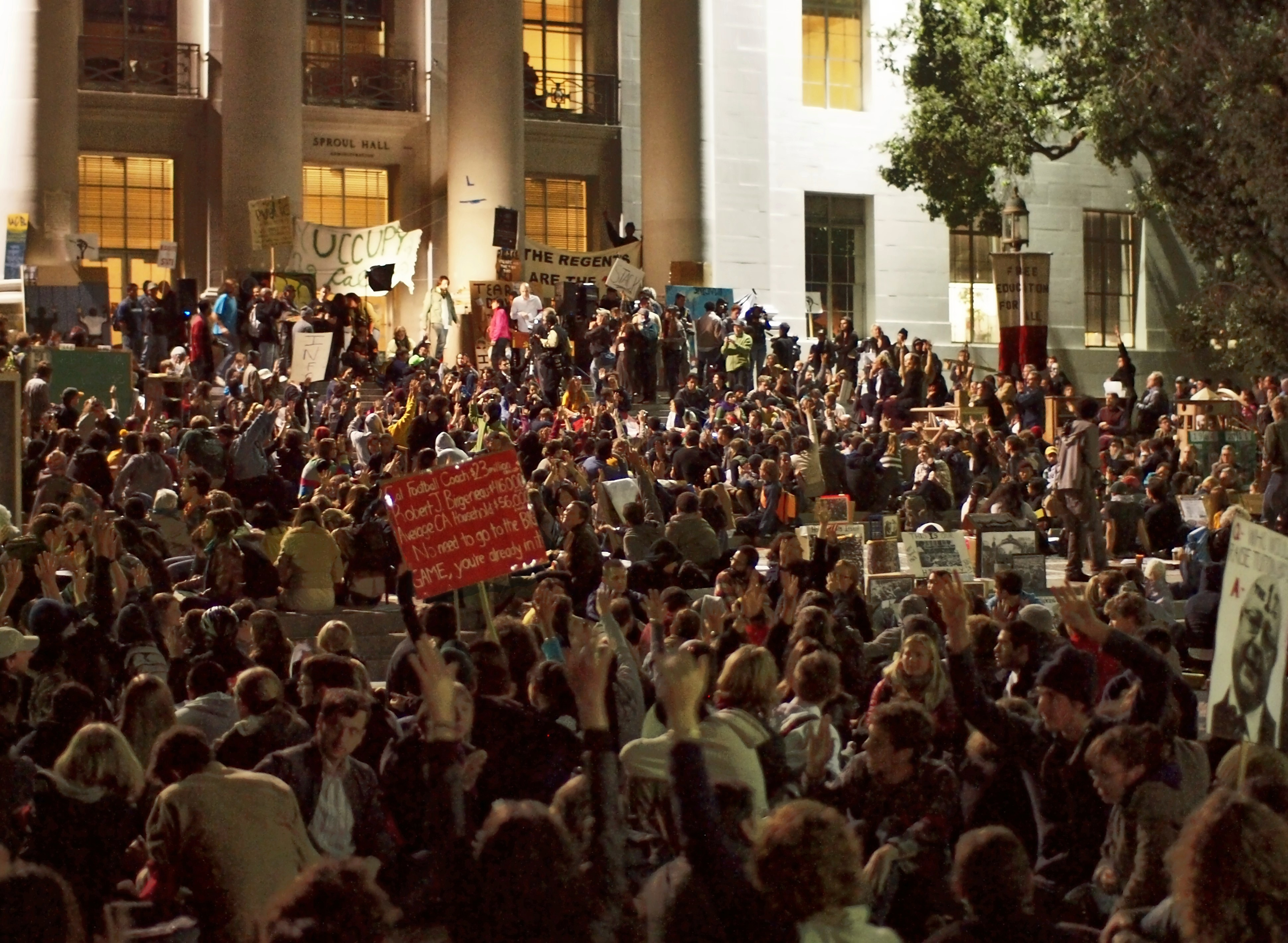
Occupy Cal General Assembly at night

In response to the actions of police officers and other perceived failings of Chancellor Birgeneau and the UC Regents, the Occupy Cal voted to call for a general strike at UC Berkeley on November 15, 2011. The timing of the strike and protests was intended to coincide with a meeting of the UC Regents the next day, which was then cancelled by UC Regents and administrators from the UC Office of the President, citing "credible law enforcement intelligence". Many students and faculty did not attend classes and walked out, or incorporated teach-ins, or spent at least part of the day actively protesting. The UC Davis Faculty Association also voted to endorse the November 15 systemwide strike. Events included a downtown march past Berkeley High School and Berkeley City College, speeches, and resolutions.

A small encampment was set up and allowed to exist for a day before being peacefully dismantled on November 17, with 2 voluntary arrests at 3:30 AM. Approximately 100 to 120 police in riot gear were used to dismantle the tents and make the arrests. Following that, tents were flown over Upper Sproul using balloons, including a banner claiming "Our Space".

On November 18, newspaper reports indicate that UC Davis police officers used pepper spray on protesters sitting peacefully on the ground.

On December 11, the last day to date of the visible presence of Occupy Cal on the Mario Savio steps of Sproul Hall, a UC Berkeley student who took a vow of silence as a means of non-violent protest, was arrested, apparently under Section 5150 of the California Welfare and Institutions Code.

UC Berkeley Anthropology Library Occupation 2012

On January 17, 2012, a proposal was brought to the Occupy Cal General Assembly to occupy UC Berkeley's George and Mary Foster Anthropology Library due to a recent decision by the administration to reduce the library's hours and service offerings. As part of the overall trend of privatization and divesting of public resources, the university has reduced spending on its libraries by 12 percent since 2012. With mass approval by the General Assembly, members of Occupy Cal decided to lead a study-in of the anthropology library on January 19 to demand the reinstatement of the library's hours and resources.

On January 19, 2012, following a noon-time rally by the larger Occupy Cal community, a group of roughly 100 students, faculty, and staff occupied the anthropology library and sent their demands to the administration. The non-violent study-in lasted 3 days and 2 nights, and involved several email exchanges between administration, and students and faculty.

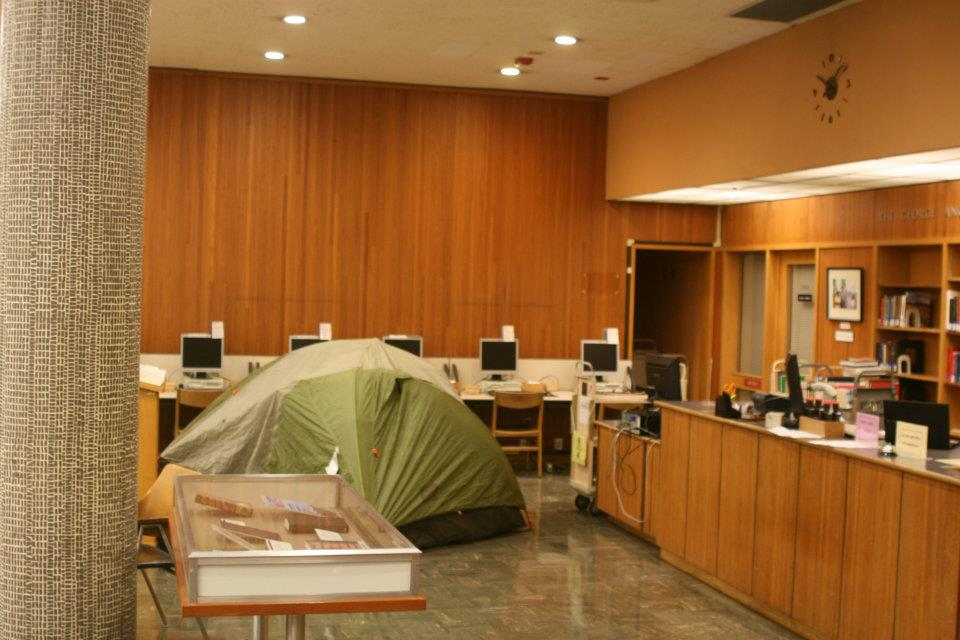
Following the cutting of the library hours, on January 19, 2012, Occupy Cal hosted a study-in of the George and Mary Foster Anthropology Library to demand reinstatement of the library's hours and services. On January 21, 2012, the occupiers were notified by the administration that their demands would be met and library hours would be reinstated.

On January 21, 2012, the occupiers were notified by the administration that their demands would be met: library hours would be reinstated, and a replacement job would be created to achieve regular access to the library. While many non-tangible successes were achieved by Occupy Cal, the reinstatement of the anthropology library's hours represented a concrete, observable success in protecting the accessibility and quality of education at the University of California, Berkeley.

=== Lawsuit ===
BAMN and twenty-nine protesters sued the UC-Berkeley Chancellor Birgeneau, other administrators, UCPD, and other Alameda County Sheriffs for $15 million for excessive force, false arrests, and violation of First Amendment rights from the November 9 protests. They cited other cases where excessive force was used on Occupy protestors and instances where camping was allowed to strengthen their case. The lawsuit went on for a number of years and the organization BAMN presented evidence and legal arguments suggesting that police and administrator actions were excessive and impacted political speech. BAMN encouraged people to attend the final hearing on Sept. 10, 2013, claiming that this was a major part of the movement and that without the support of the community, the protests on Nov. 9th were in vain. Reports indicate the lawsuit sought $15 million in damages, though a final verified outcome is not cited here.

== See also ==
- List of global Occupy protest locations
- Occupy the Farm
- UC Berkeley Anthropology Library Occupation 2012
