= George M. Foster (anthropologist) =

American anthropologist (1913–2006)

George McClelland Foster Jr. (October 9, 1913 – May 18, 2006) was an American anthropologist at the University of California, Berkeley, best known for contributions on peasant societies (the "principle of limited good" and the "Dyadic Contract") and as one of the founders of medical anthropology. He served as president of the American Anthropological Association (elected 1970). And was elected member of the U.S. National Academy of Sciences (elected 1976)and American Academy of Arts and Sciences (elected 1980). He received the 1982 Malinowski Award from the Society for Applied Anthropology and the Lifetime Achievement Award from the Society for Medical Anthropology in 2005. A festschrift in his honor was published in 1979. He was married to the linguist Mary LeCron Foster, and in 1997 the U.C. Berkeley anthropology library was renamed the George and Mary Foster Anthropology Library in their honor.

== Selected publications ==
- Foster, George M. (1960) Culture and Conquest: America's Spanish Heritage, Viking Fund Publications in Anthropology No. 27. New York: Wenner-Gren Foundation for Anthropological Research.
- Foster, George M. (1961) The Dyadic Contract: A model for social structure of a Mexican peasant village. Am. Anthropol. 63:1173–1192.
- Foster, George M.(1962) Traditional Cultures and the Impact of Technological Change, New York: Harper & Bros.
- Foster, George M.(1967) Tzintzuntzan: Mexican Peasants in a Changing World, Boston: Little, Brown and Co.
