= Zero-sum thinking =

Cognitive bias

Zero-sum thinking perceives situations as zero-sum games, where one person's gain would be another's loss. The term is derived from game theory. However, unlike the game theory concept, zero-sum thinking refers to a psychological construct—a person's subjective interpretation of a situation. Zero-sum thinking is captured by the saying "your gain is my loss" or, conversely, "your loss is my gain". Rozycka-Tran et al. (2015) defined zero-sum thinking as:

A general belief system about the antagonistic nature of social relations, shared by people in a society or culture and based on the implicit assumption that a finite amount of goods exists in the world, in which one person's winning makes others the losers, and vice versa ... a relatively permanent and general conviction that social relations are like a zero-sum game. People who share this conviction believe that success, especially economic success, is possible only at the expense of other people's failures.

Zero-sum bias is a cognitive bias towards zero-sum thinking; it is people's tendency to intuitively judge that a situation is zero-sum, even when this is not the case. This bias promotes zero-sum fallacies—false beliefs that situations are zero-sum. Such fallacies can cause other false judgements and poor decisions. In economics, "zero-sum fallacy" generally refers to the fixed-pie fallacy.

== Examples ==
Examples of zero-sum thinking—some of them fallacious—include:

- When jurors assume that any evidence compatible with more than one theory offers no support for any theory, even if the evidence is incompatible with some possibilities or the theories are not mutually exclusive.
- When students in a classroom think they are being graded on a curve when in fact they are being graded based on predetermined standards.
- In a negotiation when one negotiator thinks that they can only gain at the expense of the other party (i.e., that mutual gain is not possible).
- In the context of social group competition, the belief that more resources for one group (e.g., immigrants) means less for others (e.g., non-immigrants).
- Jack of all trades, master of none: the idea that having more skills means having less aptitude (also known as compensatory reasoning).
- In copyright infringement debate, the idea that every unauthorized duplication is a lost sale.
- When politicians argue that international trade must mean that one party is "winning" and another is "losing" when transfer of goods and services at mutually-agreeable prices is in general mutually beneficial, or that a trade deficit represents "losing" money to another country.
- Group membership is sometimes treated as zero-sum, such that stronger membership in one group is seen as weaker membership in another.

== Causes ==
There is no evidence which suggests that zero-sum thinking is an enduring feature of human psychology. Game-theoretic situations rarely apply to instances of individual behaviour. This is demonstrated by the ordinary response to the prisoner's dilemma.

Zero-sum thinking is the result of both proximate and ultimate causes.

=== Ultimate causes ===
In terms of ultimate causation, zero-sum thinking might be a legacy of human evolution. Specifically, it might be understood to be a psychological adaptation that facilitated successful resource competition in the environment of ancestral humans where resources like mates, status, and food were perpetually scarce. For example, Rubin suggests that the pace of technological growth was so slow during the period in which modern humans evolved that no individual would have observed any growth during their lifetime: "Each person would live and die in a world of constant technology and income. Thus, there was no incentive to evolve a mechanism for understanding or planning for growth". Rubin also points to instances where the understanding of laypeople and economists about economic situations diverge, such as the lump-of-labor fallacy. From this perspective, zero-sum thinking might be understood as the default way that humans think about resource allocations, which must be unlearned by, for example, an education in basic economics.

=== Proximate causes ===
Zero-sum thinking can also be understood in terms of proximate causation, which refers to the developmental history of individuals within their own lifetime. The proximate causes of zero-sum thinking include the experiences that individuals have with resource allocations, as well as their beliefs about specific situations, or their beliefs about the world in general.

==== Resource-scarce environments ====
One of the proximate causes of zero-sum thinking is the experiences that individuals have with scarce resources or zero-sum interactions in their developmental environment. In 1965, George M. Foster argued that members of "peasant" societies have an "Image of Limited Good", which he argued was learned through by experiences in a society that was essentially zero-sum:

The model of cognitive orientation that seems to me best to account for peasant behavior is the "Image of Limited Good". By "Image of Limited Good" I mean that broad areas of peasant behavior are patterned in such fashion as to suggest that peasants view their social, economic, and natural universes—their total environment—as one in which all of the desired things in life such as land, wealth, health, friendship and love, manliness and honor, respect and status, power and influence, security and safety, exist in finite quantity and are always in short supply, as far as the peasant is concerned. Not only do these and all other "good things" exist in finite and limited quantities, but in addition there is no way directly within peasant power to increase the available quantities ... When the peasant views his economic world as one in which Limited Good prevails, and he can progress only at the expense of another, he is usually very near the truth.

More recently, Rozycka-Tran et al. (2015) conducted a cross-cultural study that compared the responses of individuals in 37 nations to a scale of zero-sum beliefs. This scale asked individuals to report their agreement with statements that measured zero-sum thinking. For example, one item on the scale stated that "Successes of some people are usually failures of others". Rozycka-Tran et al. found that individuals in countries with lower Gross Domestic Product showed stronger zero-sum beliefs on average, suggesting that "the belief in zero-sum game seems to arise in countries with lower income, where resources are scarce". Similarly, Rozycka-Tran et al. found that individuals with lower socioeconomic status displayed stronger zero-sum beliefs.

==== Resource scarcity beliefs ====
Related to experiences with resource-scarce environments is the belief that a resource is scarce or finite. For example, the lump of labour fallacy refers to the belief that in the economy there is a fixed amount of work to be done, and thus the allocation of jobs is zero-sum. Although the belief that a resource is scarce might develop through experiences with resource scarcity, this is not necessarily the case. For example, individuals might come to believe that wealth is finite because it is a claim that has been repeated by politicians or journalists.

==== Resource entitlement beliefs ====
Another proximate cause of zero-sum thinking is the belief that one (or one's group) is entitled to a certain share of a resource. An extreme case is the belief that one is entitled to all of a resource that exists, implying that any gains by another is one's own loss. Less extreme is the belief that one (or one's group) is superior and therefore entitled to more than others. For example, perceptions of zero-sum group competition have been associated with the Dominance sub-scale of the social dominance orientation personality trait, which itself has been characterized as a zero-sum worldview ("a view of human existence as zero-sum"). Individuals who practice monogamy have also been found to think about love in consensually nonmonogamous relationships as zero-sum, and it was suggested that this might be because they believe that individuals in romantic relationships have an entitlement to their partner's love.

== Effects ==
When individuals think that a situation is zero-sum, they will be more likely to act competitively (or less cooperatively) towards others, because they will see others as a competitive threat. For example, when students think that they are being graded on a curve—a grading scheme that makes the allocation of grades zero-sum—they will be less likely to provide assistance to a peer who is proximate in status to themselves, because that peer's gain could be their own loss.

When individuals perceive that there is a zero-sum competition in society for resources like jobs, they will be less likely to hold pro-immigration attitudes (because immigrants would deplete the resource). Zero-sum thinking may also lead to certain social prejudices. When individuals hold zero-sum beliefs about love in romantic relationships, they are more prejudiced against consensual nonmonogamists (presumably because the perception of zero-sumness makes consensual nonmonogamy seem inadequate or unfair).

== See also ==
- The Limits to Growth
- Game theory
- List of cognitive biases
- Lump of labour fallacy
- Negotiation
- Scarcity
- Zero-sum game
- Limited good
