= Marco Vivarelli =

Italian economist and professor

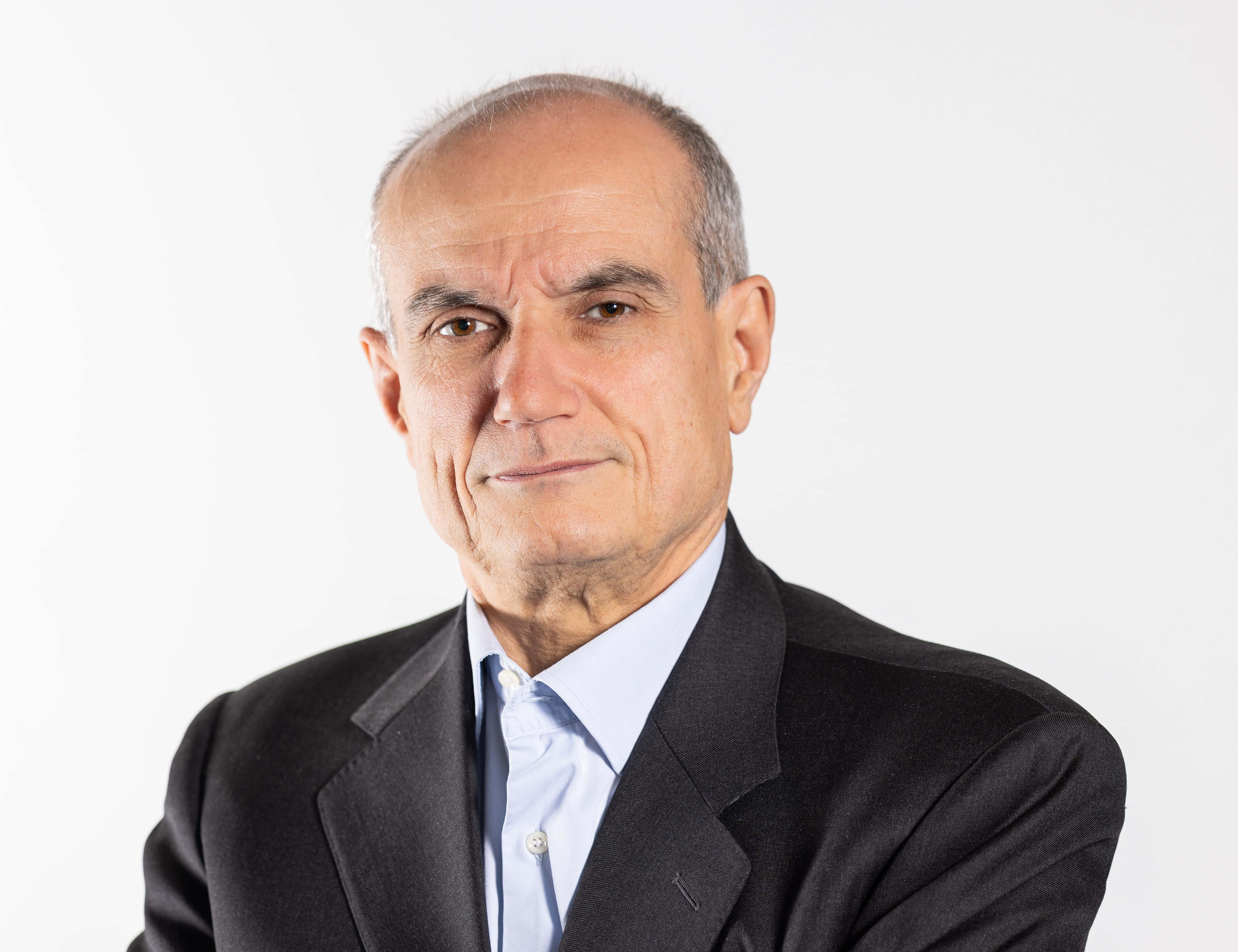
- Born: Marco Vivarelli; 11 February 1963 (age 63); Piacenza
- Awards: Member of the European Academy of Sciences and Arts (2022); Member of the Academia Europaea (2019); Cavaliere al Merito della Repubblica Italiana (2009)

Academic background
- Education: Science Policy Research Unit (SPRU), Sussex University, UK (Ph.D, 1992); Bocconi University, Milano (Laurea, 1987)
- Doctoral advisor: Christopher Freeman

Academic work
- School or tradition: Evolutionary economics
- Institutions: Università Cattolica del Sacro Cuore, Milan
- Main interests: Innovation Economics
- Website: https://sites.google.com/site/mvivarel

Marco Vivarelli (born 11 February 1963) is an Italian economist, full professor and director of the Department of Economic Policy at the Università Cattolica del Sacro Cuore, Milan, where he teaches Economic Policy and Economics of Innovation in Master and Ph.D. courses.

== Biography ==
Marco Vivarelli earned a degree from Bocconi University in Milan in 1987 and completed two Ph.D. programs, one in Science and Technology Policy at SPRU-University of Sussex in 1991 and another in Economics at the University of Pavia in 1992.

Together with his main affiliation at the Università Cattolica del Sacro Cuore, he has secondary affiliations including a Professorial Fellowship at UNU-MERIT in Maastricht, a Research Fellowship at the Institute of Labor Economics (IZA) in Bonn, and a Fellowship at the Global Labor Organization (GLO).

In addition, he is member of the Scientific Executive Board of the Eurasia Business and Economics Society (EBES) in Istanbul and serves on the Scientific Advisory Board of the Austrian Institute of Economic Research (WIFO) in Vienna.

He has been scientific consultant for international organizations such as the International Labour Office, the World Bank, the Inter-American Development Bank, the United Nations Industrial Development Organization, and the European Commission.

He is Editor-in-Chief of the Eurasian Business Review, Editor of Small Business Economics, co-Editor of Economics: The Open-Access, Open-Assessment Journal, Associate Editor of Economics of Innovation and New Technology, Associate Editor of Industrial and Corporate Change. He also serves on the editorial boards of the International Entrepreneurship and Management Journal, the Journal of Industrial and Business Economics, the Italian Economic Journal and the Rivista Internazionale di Scienze Sociali- Research In Social Sciences.

Throughout his career, he has held various appointments, including honorary and visiting professorships at institutions like SPRU-University of Sussex (2010-2013), the University of Warwick (2005-2012), and the Max Planck Institute of Economics in Jena (2004-2009). He has also served as a senior scientist at the European Commission’s Joint Research Centre in Seville (2007-2009) and as a senior research economist at the International Labour Office in Geneva (2002-2005).

== Scientific research impact ==
According to the World's Top 2% Scientists database provided by Stanford University he is ranked #453 among the 975 top 2% economists

According to Research.com, he is ranked #607 among the top 8,000 economists worldwide (#12 in Italy); and #362 among the top 8,000 Business and Management Scientists (#6 in Italy).

According to REPEC-IDEAS, he is among the global top 2% authors

According to SSRN, he is among the top 500 economics authors worldwide

According to VIA-Academy, he is ranked among the top Italian scientists worldwide (13th among economists).

According to IZA, he is ranked #3 in terms of number of downloads, among a total of more than 12,000 IZA discussion paper authors

According to GOOGLE SCHOLAR, his works collected more than 16,500 citations (h-index=72).

According to SCOPUS, his works collected more than 5,600 citations (h-index=46).

== Research Focuses ==
In 1995 Vivarelli published The Economics of Technology and Employment: Theory and Empirical Evidence, Elgar, Cheltenham, reprinted 1997.

He is author of more than 85 scientific publications in refereed international journals.

His current research interests include the relationship between innovation, employment and skills; the labour market and income distribution impacts of globalization; the entry and post-entry performance of newborn firms. From a methodological point of view, his articles are based on microeconometric evidence.

As far as the link between innovation and employment is concerned, his research provides theoretical arguments and empirical evidence showing that the mainstream optimism about the full compensation of technological unemployment by market forces is unfounded. Indeed, product innovation is generally labour friendly but process innovation (for instance robots) may negatively affect employment, while compensation may be affected by several market failures. As a policy implication, product innovation in high-tech and emerging sectors should be fostered and safety nets should be framed for the possible victims of automation.

As far as globalization is concerned, his research output provides evidence that globalization may have controversial effect in terms of employment, skills and income distribution. In contrast with the mainstream optimism about the overall positive impact of free trade and FDI, globalization - combined with technology transfer - may imply job losses and increasing inequality (in particular in the developing countries). As a policy implication, controlled and gradual globalization should be encouraged and coupled with proper social measures.

As far as the entry and post-entry performance of newborn firms are concerned, the empirical results of his research show that - contrary to the entrepreneurial vulgate - only a tiny minority of new firms are innovative and that most of new ventures are doomed to early failure. As a policy implication, "erga omnes" policies fostering firm formation should be avoided, while entry and post-entry subsidies should be targeted and very selective.

== Honours ==
Member of the Academia Europaea (since 2019)

Member of the European Academy of Sciences and Arts (since 2022)

Cavaliere Ordine al Merito della Repubblica Italiana (2009)
