= Lump of labour fallacy =

Misconception in economics about allocation of work

In economics, the lump of labour fallacy is the misconception that there is a finite amount of work—a lump of labour—to be done within an economy. It is also known as the lump of jobs fallacy, fallacy of labour scarcity, fixed pie fallacy, and the zero-sum fallacy—due to its ties to zero-sum games. The term "fixed pie fallacy" is also used more generally to refer to the idea that there is a fixed amount of wealth in the world. This and other zero-sum fallacies can be caused by zero-sum bias.

The term originated to rebut the idea that reducing the number of hours employees are allowed to labour during the working day would lead to a reduction in unemployment. The term is also commonly used to describe the false belief that increasing labour productivity, automation, immigration, or women's participation in the workforce causes an increase in unemployment. The facts show that just like the amount of labor is not fixed, neither is the size of the economy (fixed pie fallacy) and as more work is done, the economy grows.

== Automation/technological change ==
While many workers fear that automation or artificial intelligence will take their jobs, history has shown that when jobs in some sectors disappear, jobs in new sectors are created. One example is the United States, where a century of increasing productivity and technological improvements changed the percentage of Americans employed in the production of food from 41% of the workforce in 1900 to 2% in 2000. This change did not result in large-scale unemployment, because workers found jobs in newly created industries (like farm equipment manufacturing). Another way to state this is that automation or technological improvements free workers to move to new growing industries.

== Immigration and women in the workforce ==
While many people worry that new immigrants to their country will reduce employment (the same way US men in the 1960s worried that women's entry into the workforce would lead to massive unemployment) the data show that this did not happen because new workers earn money which they spend with the result being that the total economy grows and more people are employed.

== Early retirement ==
Early retirement has been used to induce workers to accept termination of employment before retirement age following the employer's diminished labour needs.

In an editorial in The Economist a thought experiment is proposed in which old people leave the workforce in favour of young people, on whom they become dependent for their living through state benefits. It is then argued that since growth depends on having either more workers or greater productivity, the society cannot really become more prosperous by paying an increasing number of its citizens unproductively. The article also points out that even early retirees with private pension funds become a burden on society as they also depend on equity and bond income generated by workers.

== Arguments against lump of labour being a fallacy ==
There have been critiques of the idea that the concept is a fallacy. Arguments include that Schloss' concept is misapplied to working hours and that he was originally critiquing workers intentionally restricting their output, and that John Maynard Keynes believed shorter working hours could alleviate unemployment.

== See also ==
- Indivisibility of labour
- Labour (economics)
- Luddite fallacy
- Parable of the broken window
- Robot tax
- Technological unemployment
- Working time
- Zero-sum bias
