= Main Campus of San Francisco State University =

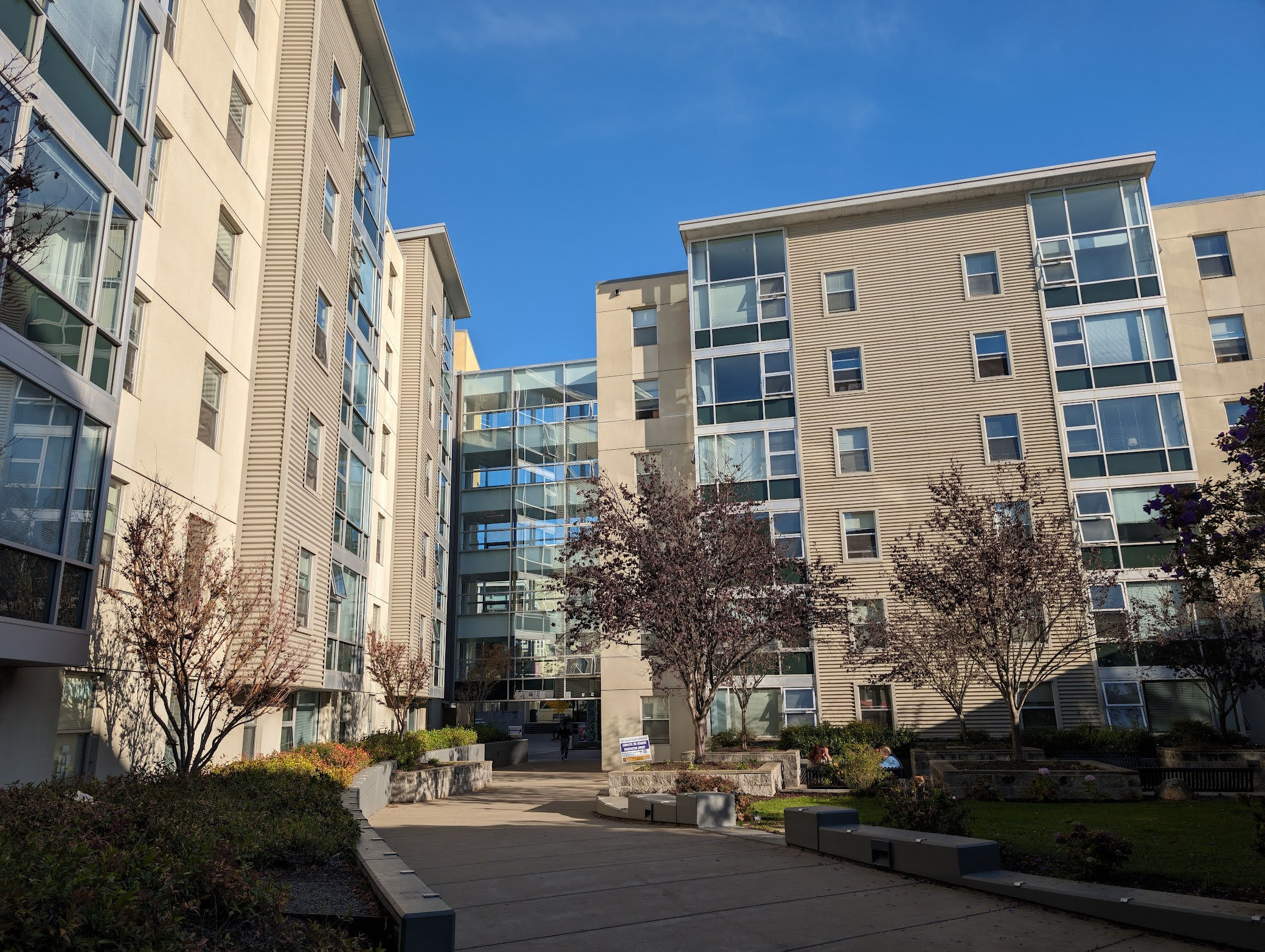
The Village at Centennial Square is one of San Francisco State University's housing communities.

San Francisco State University's 144.1-acre main campus is located on the West Side of San Francisco, in the southwestern part of the city. To its north are Lowell High School and Stonestown Galleria. Parkmerced is south of the campus. 19th Avenue and the Ingleside neighborhood are to its east and Lake Merced and TPC Harding Park are to its west.

Unlike other university campuses, there is no unifying architectural element. All buildings are modern, with some specifically brutalist.

88.5% of the university's students commute to the campus. The university has a reputation for having many commuter students due to a lack of student housing on campus and San Francisco's high cost of living.

The campus is under the jurisdiction of San Francisco State's University Police Department.

== History ==
San Francisco State University's original campus was on Nob Hill, where it was established as the San Francisco State Normal School on Powell Street between Clay and Sacramento Streets. The 1906 earthquake and fire forced a relocation to Buchanan and Haight Streets, where the institution would remain for several decades. During this period, the school underwent several transformations: becoming San Francisco State Teachers College in 1921, San Francisco State College in 1935.

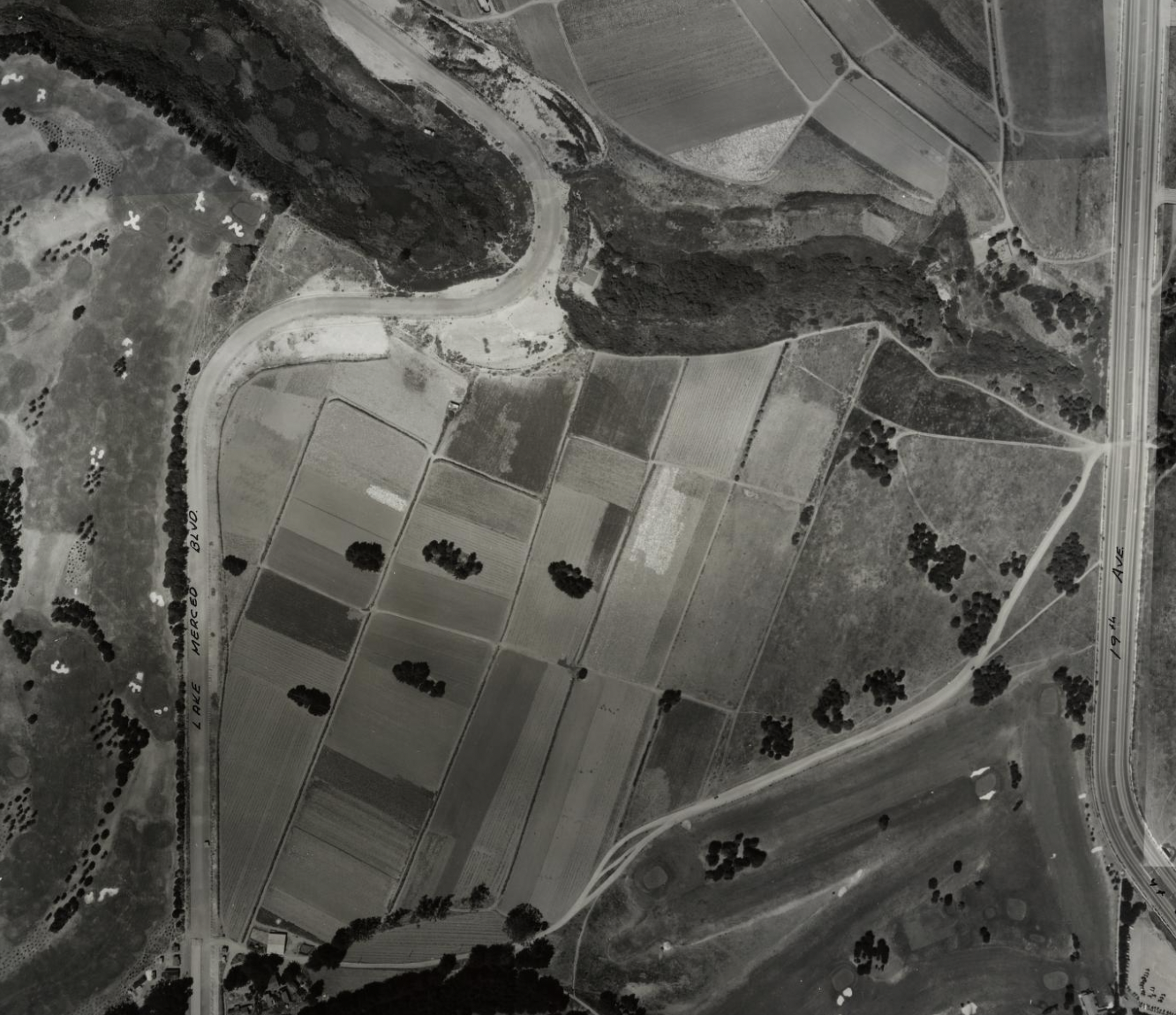
Site of San Francisco State University's current main campus, seen in 1938 part of Composite: 1-164 San Francisco Aerial Views by Harrison Ryker.

The shift to the current Lake Merced campus began during the Great Depression, when the site was still owned by Spring Valley Water Company. In 1939, SF State President Alexander Roberts and Student Body president Clifford Worth explored the undeveloped property, which at the time consisted mainly of sand dunes dotted with trees and underbrush. Worth proved instrumental in securing the campus's future, successfully lobbying the state legislature to fund the land purchase. His efforts culminated on July 12, 1939, when the state committed to purchasing 57 acres from the City of San Francisco, but plans to build the new campus were paused due to World War II. When veterans started returning in 1945, the Vets Village, a housing complex, was built at the site of the new campus. Some students commuted from there to the campus at Buchanan and Haight Streets.

The campus footprint expanded significantly in 1948 with the acquisition of an additional 37 acres from multiple sources, including the city, the Stoneson brothers, Metropolitan Life Insurance Company, and the Standard Building Company.

The development of the Lake Merced campus proceeded in stages throughout the early 1950s. Cox Stadium was laid in 1940, followed by the laying out of sports fields in 1942 and the creation of the Lower Field in 1943. Many of the initial plantings came from the Golden Gate International Exposition at Treasure Island, providing the new campus with mature landscaping in its earliest days. The first permanent building, the Gymnasium, broke ground in June 1949 and was completed in 1951. The next few years saw rapid development, with the Science Building and library landscaping completed in 1952, major plantings along 19th Avenue finished in 1953, and the Creative Arts building landscaping established in 1954. The campus opened for classes for Fall 1953, before it was formally dedicated in October 1954.

The campus landscape has always played a crucial role in creating a distinctive educational environment. Throughout its history, the university has maintained several significant gardens. The Shakespeare Garden, created after 1978 near the HSS Building, featured plants mentioned in Shakespeare's works and served as an innovative outdoor learning space. The campus was also home to a dahlia garden from 1954 to 1964, developed by Supervising Groundsman Earl Husted, which contained approximately 2,000 varieties and won prestigious awards at the 1956 San Francisco Flower Show. During World War II, the campus community maintained Victory Gardens, growing vegetables like lettuce, carrots, and chard as part of the war effort.

The university has also established several meaningful memorial spaces that reflect its commitment to social justice and remembrance. The Garden of Remembrance, dedicated in 2002, honors 19 Japanese-American students who were interned during World War II. Designed by renowned artist Ruth Asawa, the garden features symbolic elements including a rock waterfall celebrating internees' release and ten boulders representing the ten internment camps. The AIDS Memorial Grove, established in 1989, provides a sanctuary space near the Gymnasium for remembering community members lost to AIDS.

== Facilities ==
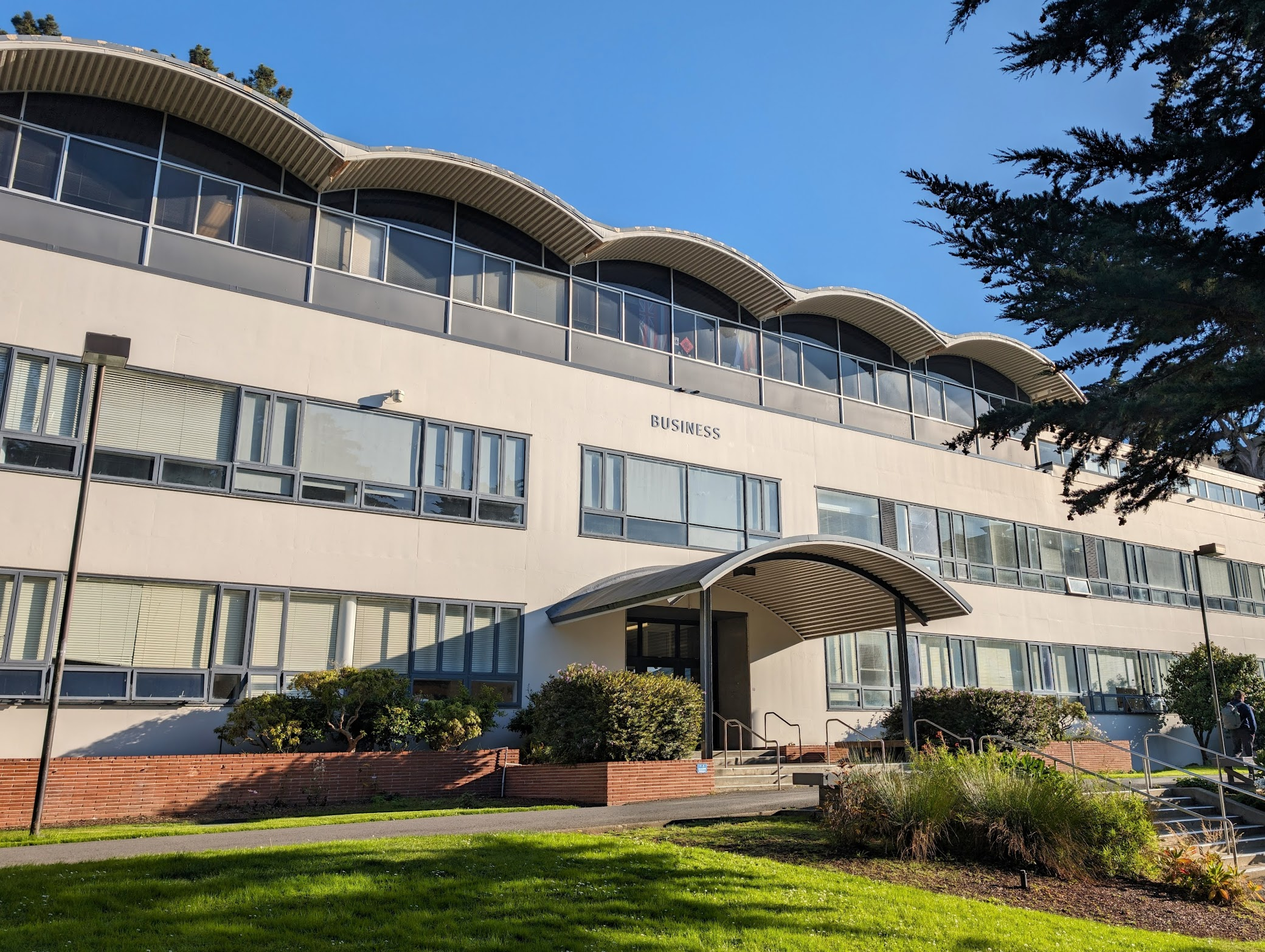
Business Building

The Student Services Building houses offices for admissions, financial aid applications, transcripts, bursar services, disability programs, counseling, career services, and veterans' services.

Burk Hall houses the Graduate College of Education, the Family, Interiors, Nutrition and Apparel Department, and the School of Nursing. It also features the student-run Vista Room restaurant on its fourth floor.

For health and wellness, the campus provides multiple facilities. The Student Health Center offers outpatient care, lab tests, X-rays, family planning, and personal counseling, with most services covered by student health fees. The Mashouf Wellness Center is a comprehensive fitness facility featuring a climbing wall, exercise studios, gymnasium spaces, an indoor pool with spa and sauna, jogging track, racquetball/squash courts, and various fitness programs.

The J. Paul Leonard Library houses Special Collections & Archives, the Sutro Library, Academic Technology, and the Center for Equity and Excellence in Teaching and Learning. The facility provides extensive study and collaboration spaces, computing support, reservable rooms, and a Digital Media Studio/MakerSpace.

The Ethnic Studies & Psychology building houses two major academic units. The College of Ethnic Studies, which is historically significant as the first of its kind, includes departments in Africana Studies, American Indian Studies, Asian American Studies, Latina/Latino Studies and Race and Resistance Studies. The Psychology Department occupies the third floor of this building.

The HSS building contains the main offices of the College of Health & Social Sciences, along with several student support programs including the Institute for Civic and Community Engagement (ICCE), TRiO Student Support Services, the Campus Academic Resource Program (CARP), and the Metro College Success Program.

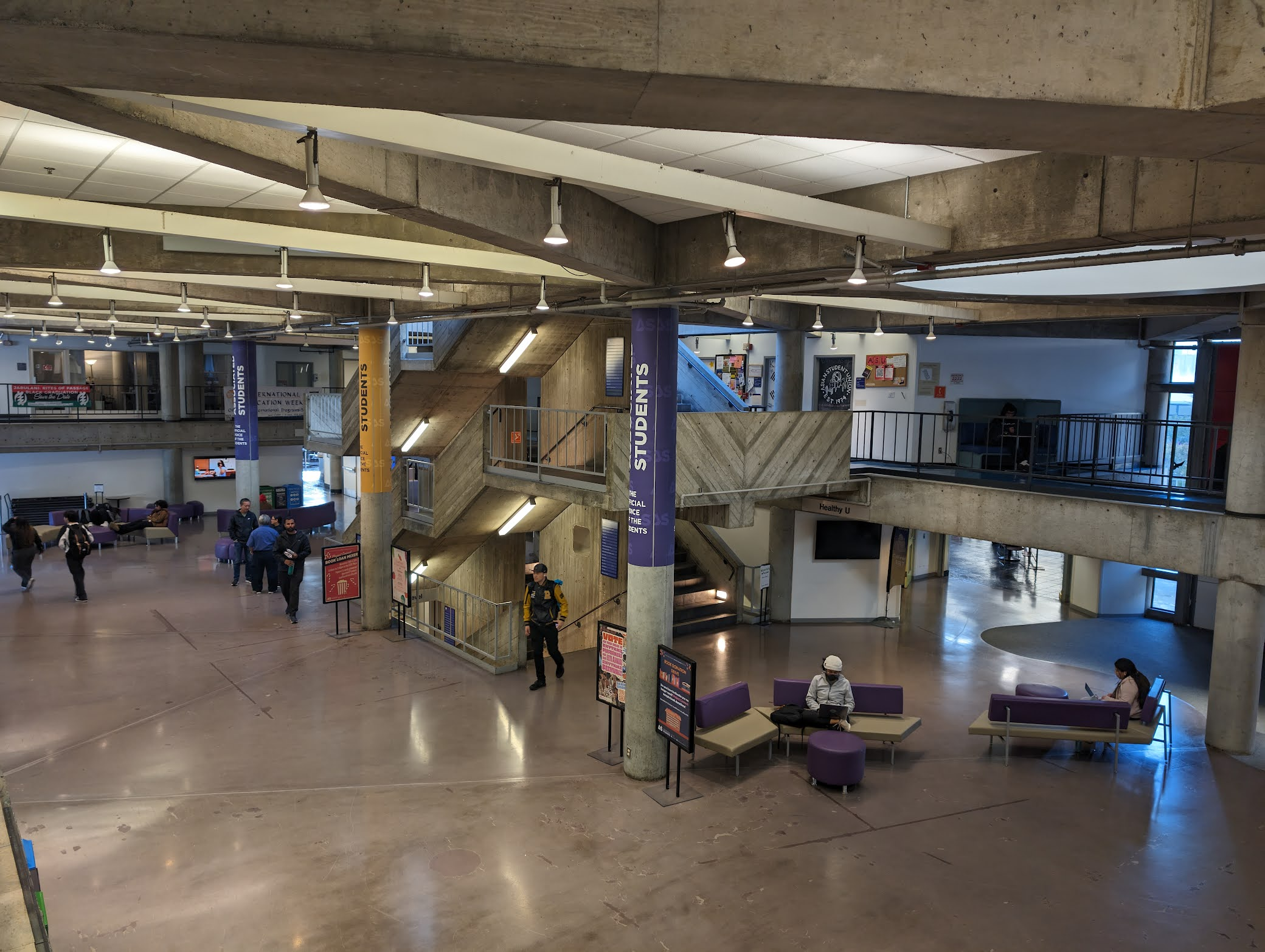
Inside Cesar Chavez Student Center

Student life centers around the Cesar Chavez Student Center, known for its distinctive murals and architecture. The building houses the SF State Bookstore, restaurants, lounges, a multicultural center, pub, student art gallery, and ATMs. It serves as home to the Associated Students organization and includes an Information Desk near the Quad entrance.

The Fine Arts Building includes a film soundstage, animation studio, recording and mixing rooms, film and sound editing labs, digital media labs, art studios, and the 150-seat August Coppola Theater.

The Creative Arts Building houses the School of Music and the School of Theatre and Dance, featuring multiple performance spaces including the McKenna Theatre, Knuth Hall, the Studio Theatre, and the Little Theatre.

The College of Science & Engineering spreads across several buildings. Thornton Hall features a fourth-floor planetarium and roof observatory. The Science building houses the School of Engineering and the Marian Wright Edelman Institute, where students and scholars collaborate with community partners on projects addressing the needs of children, youth, and families. Hensill Hall primarily accommodates the Department of Biology and its various programs, services, and labs.

Marcus Hall houses the Broadcast and Electronic Communication Arts (BECA) department and features multimedia labs and classrooms.

Student housing options are varied, with several residential communities. The Village at Centennial Square offers apartment-style living with dining options and a convenience store. Mary Park Hall, Mary Ward Hall, and West Grove Commons provide traditional residence hall communities for freshmen, while the Towers at Centennial Square offers more independent suite-style housing. Additional housing exists in University Park North and South, which provide apartment living for transfer students, returning residents, and students with families. Manzanita Square provides residential apartments with outdoor courtyards, retail spaces, student support facilities, and laundry services.

Monarca Dining Hall (formerly City Eats), serves as the primary dining commons for residential students, offering all-you-care-to-eat options and grab-and-go meals.

Most facilities on campus are accessible for persons with disabilities, though some buildings have areas requiring special consideration for wheelchair users.

=== Gallery ===
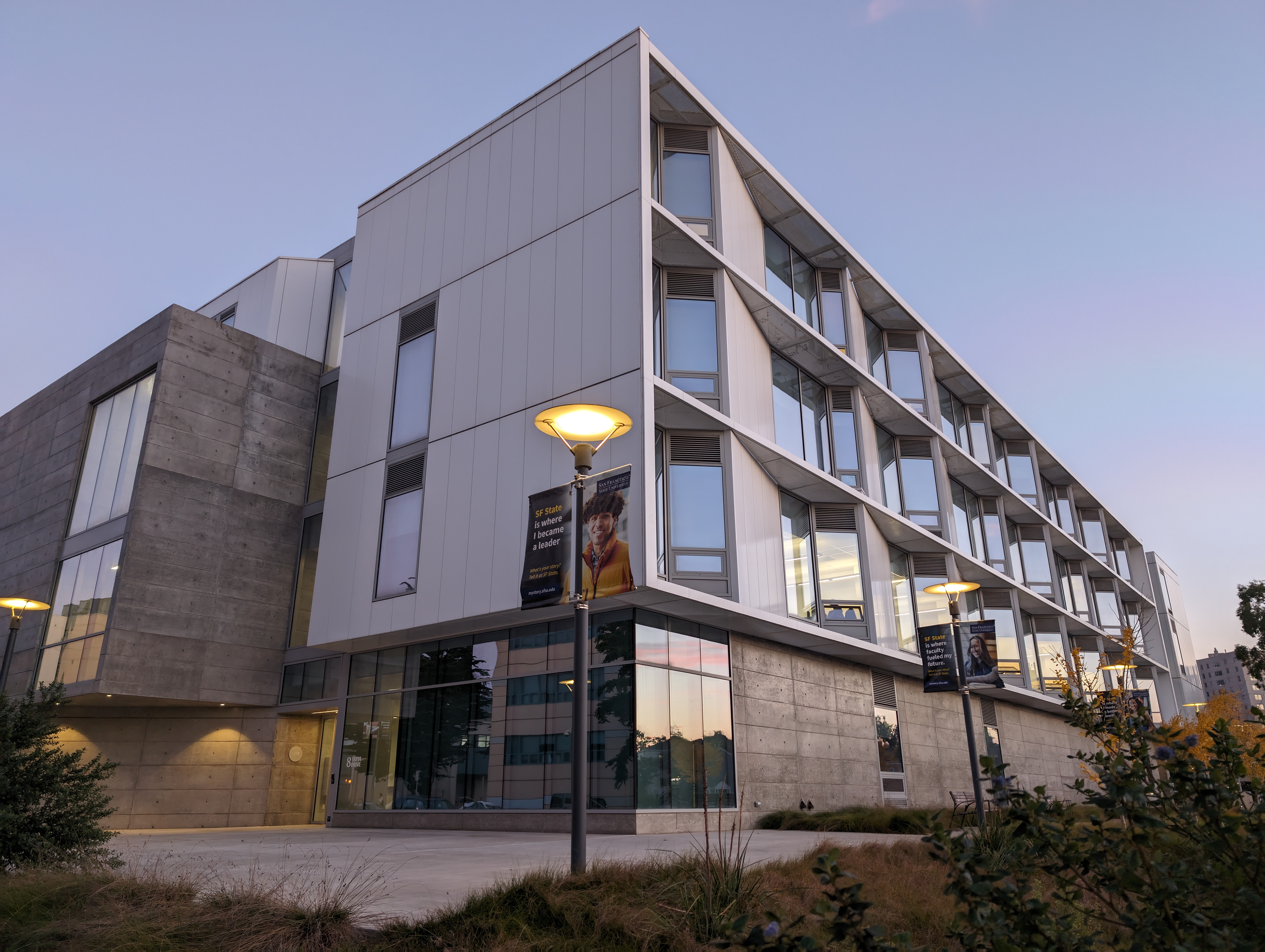
Marcus Hall

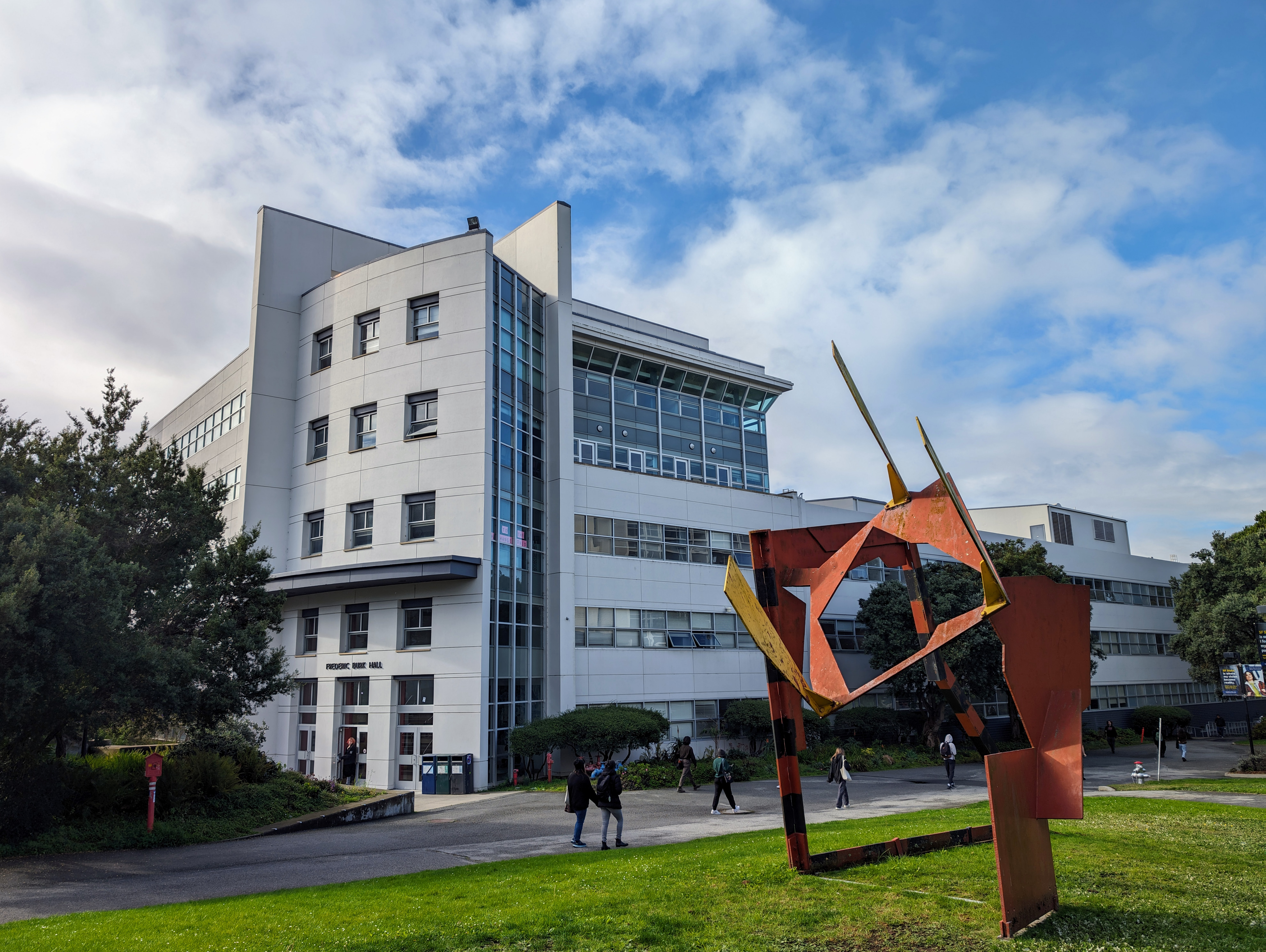
Burk Hall

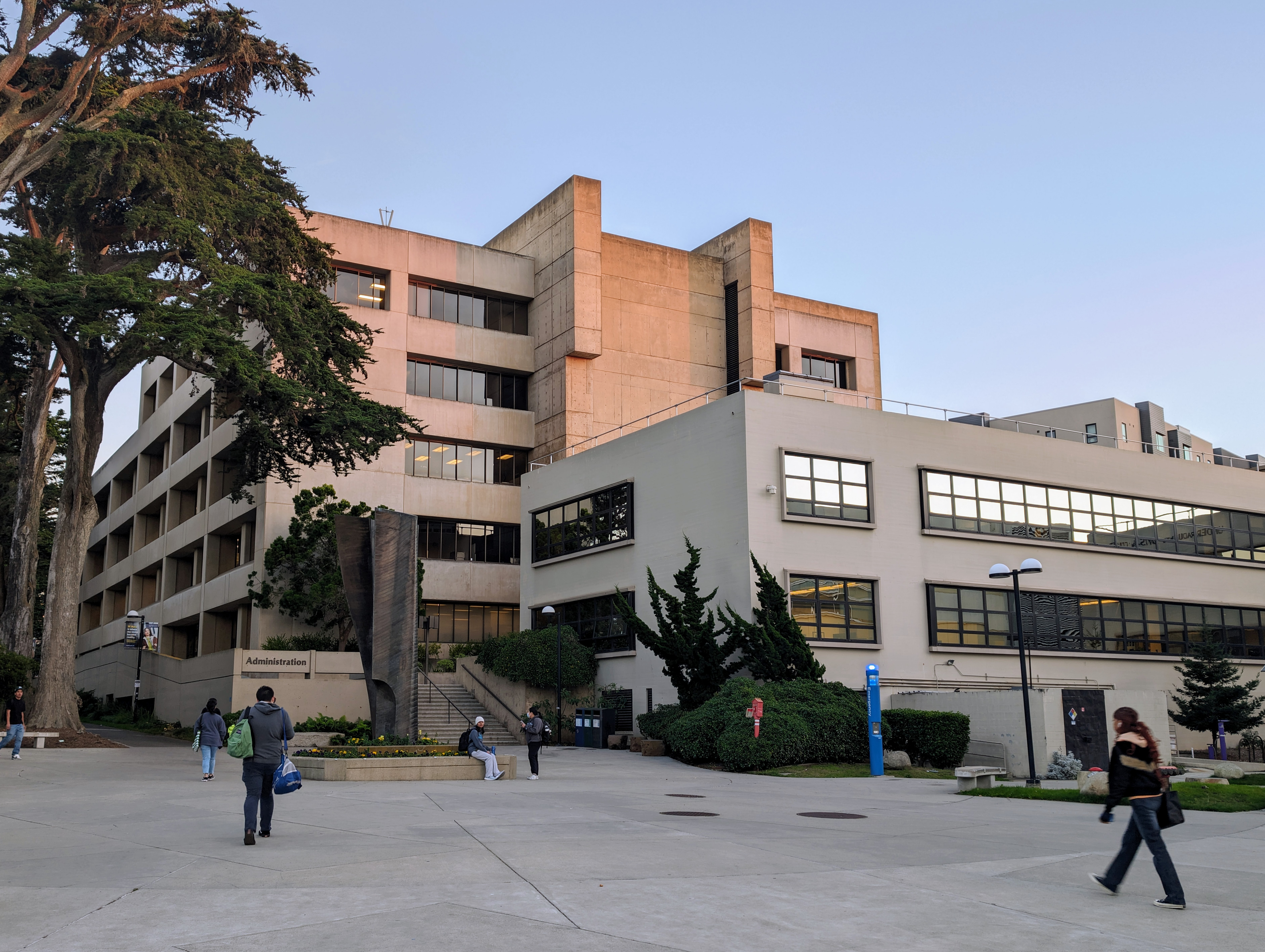
Administration Building

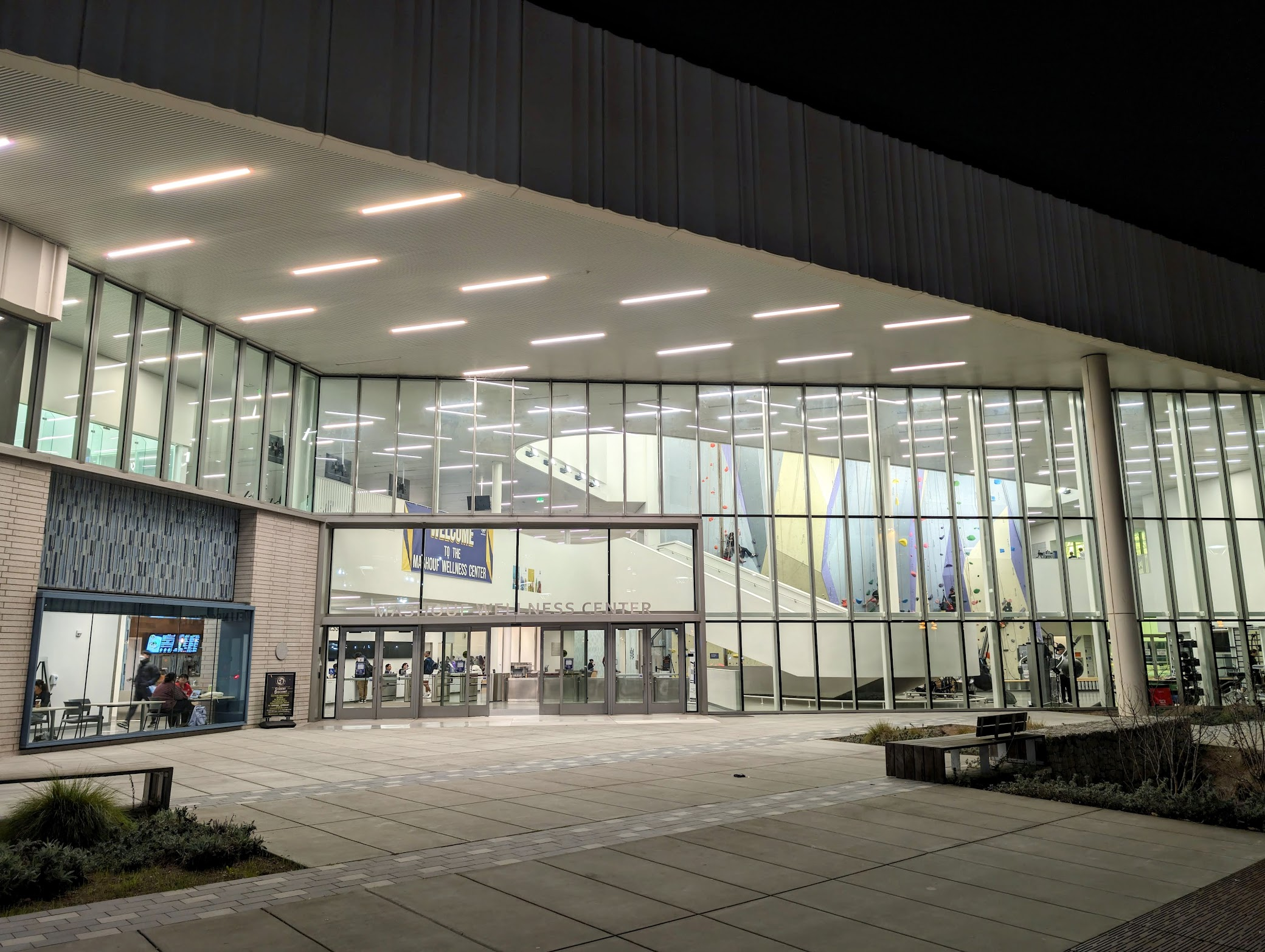
Mashouf Wellness Center

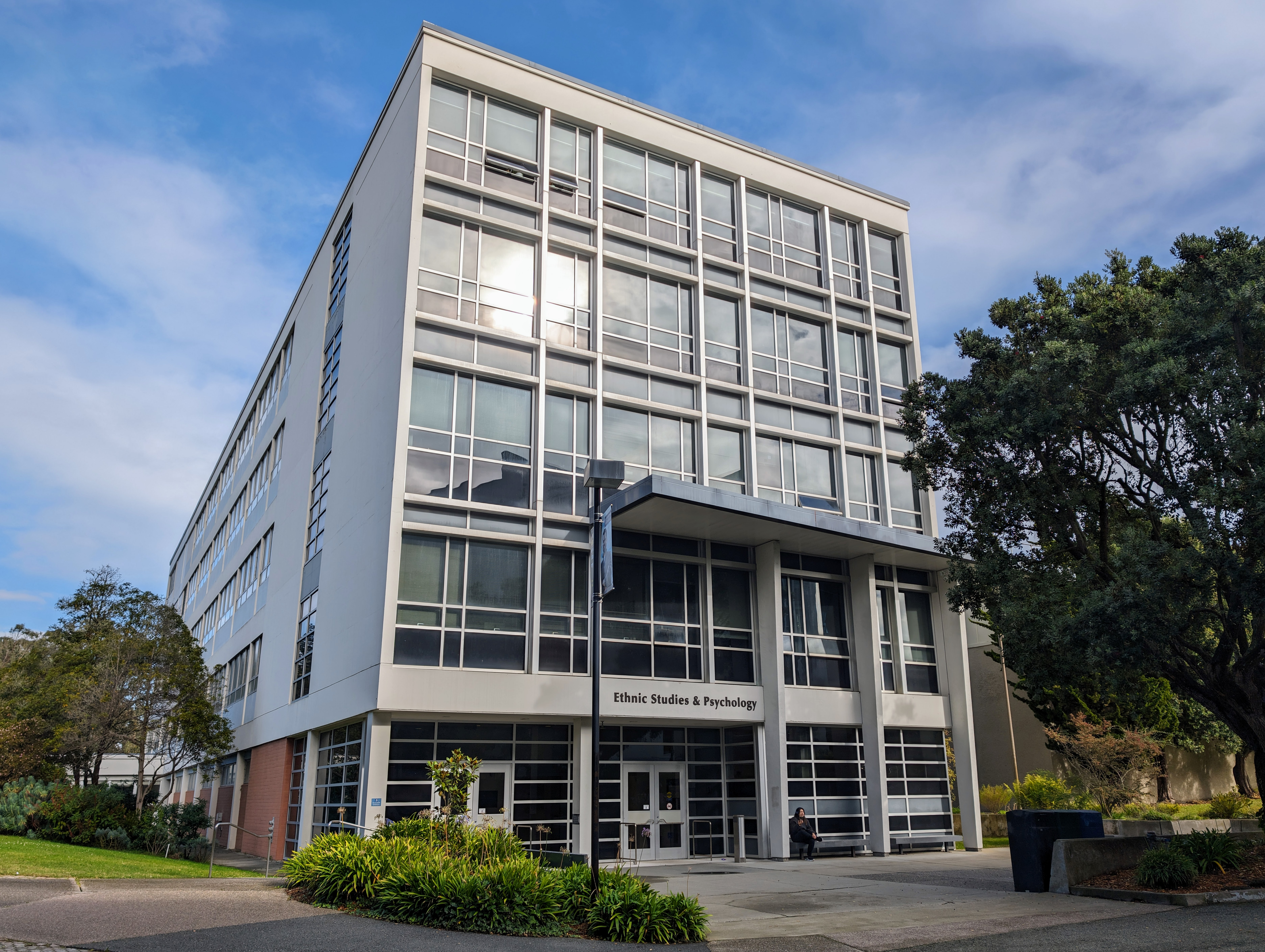
Ethnic Studies and Psychology Building

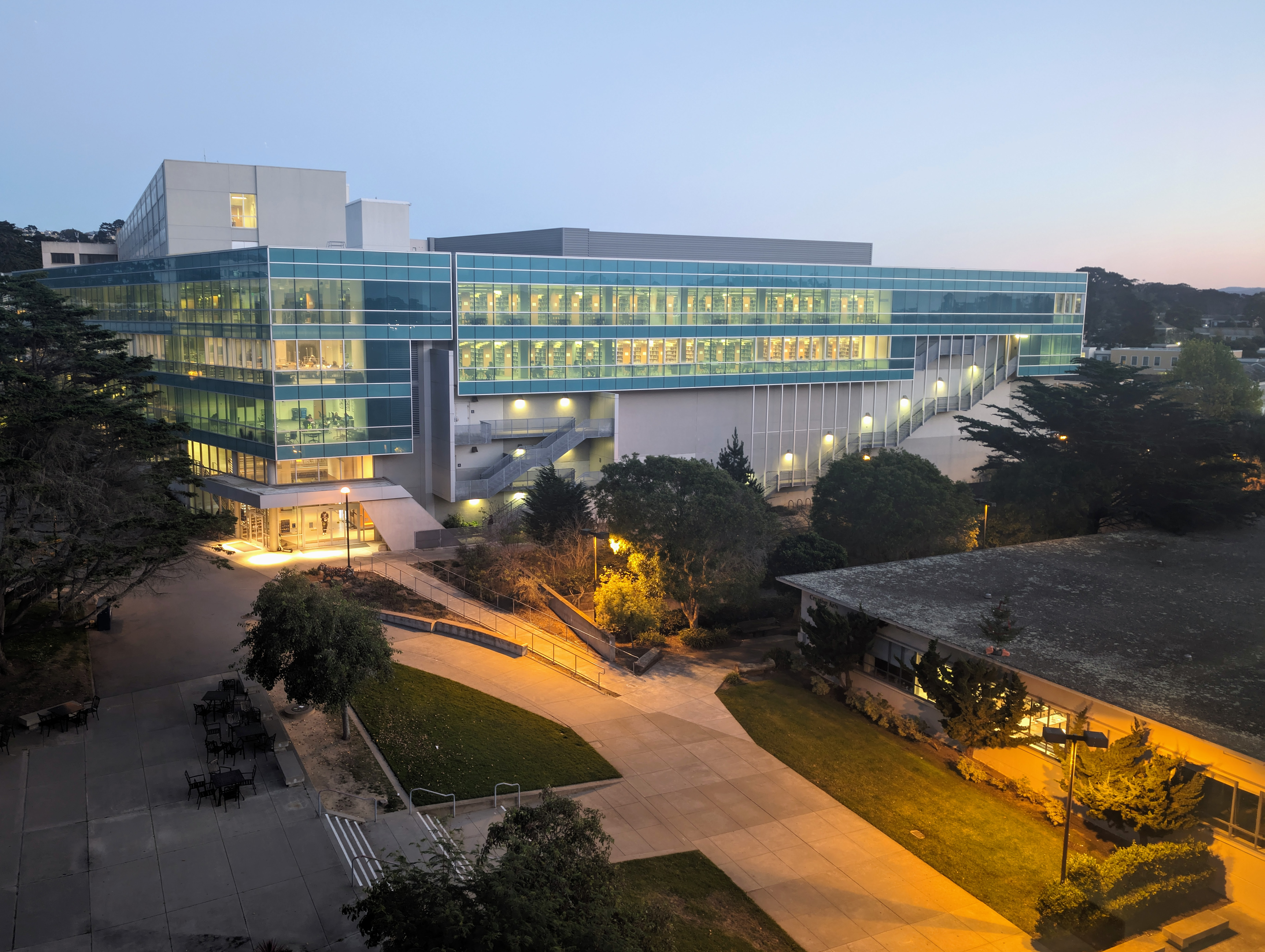
Library Building

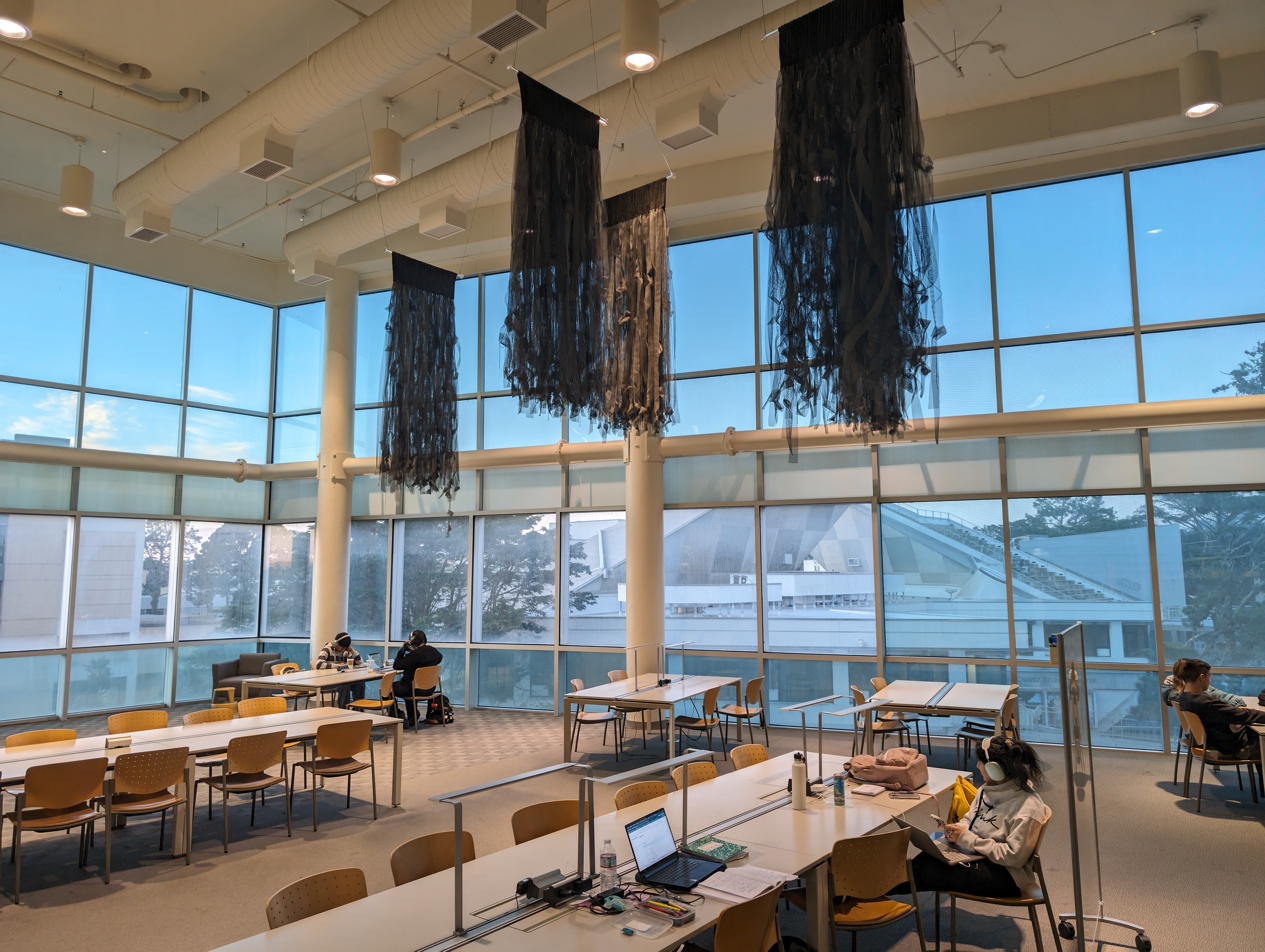
A seating area in the J. Paul Leonard Library

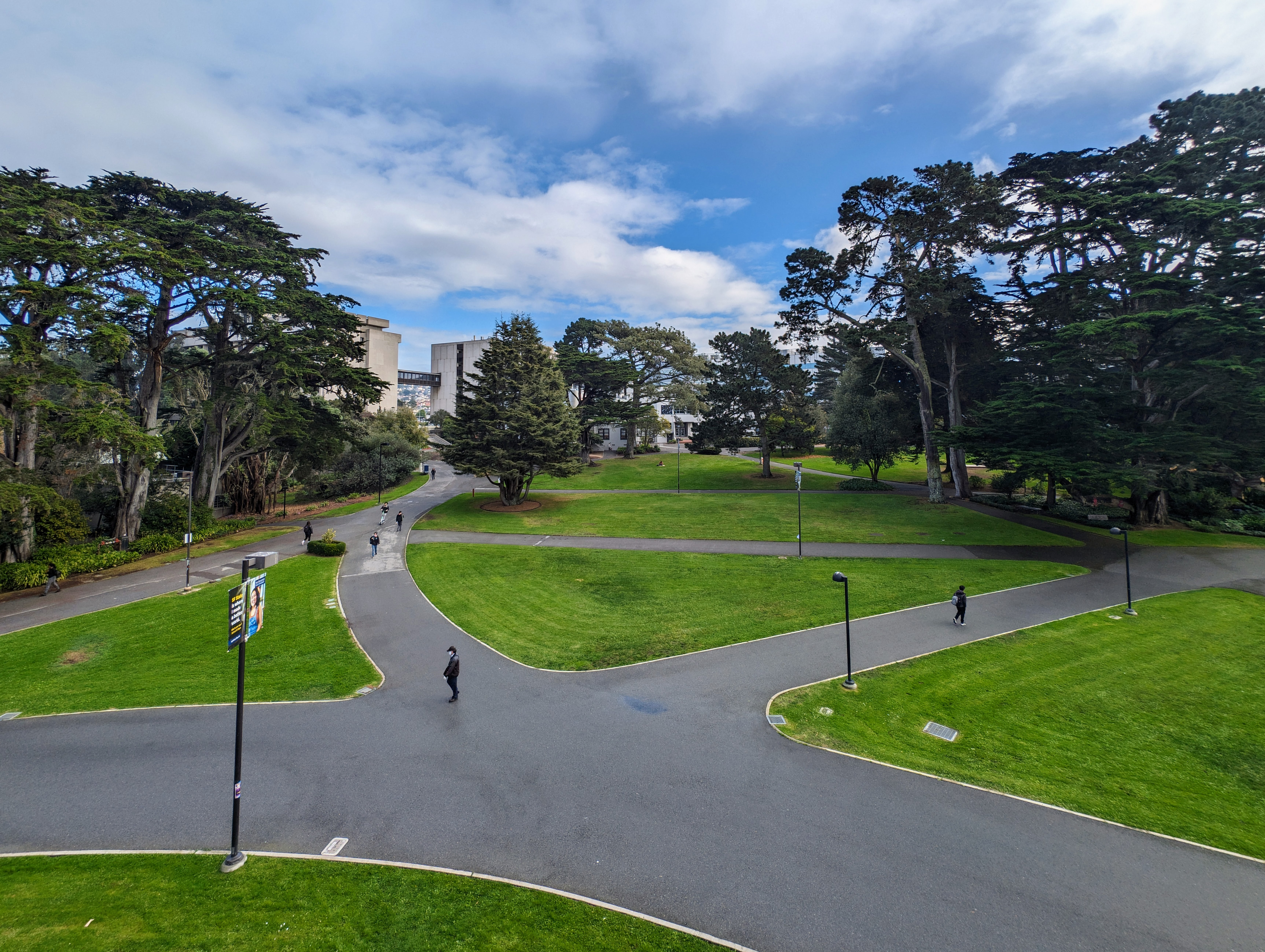
The Quad

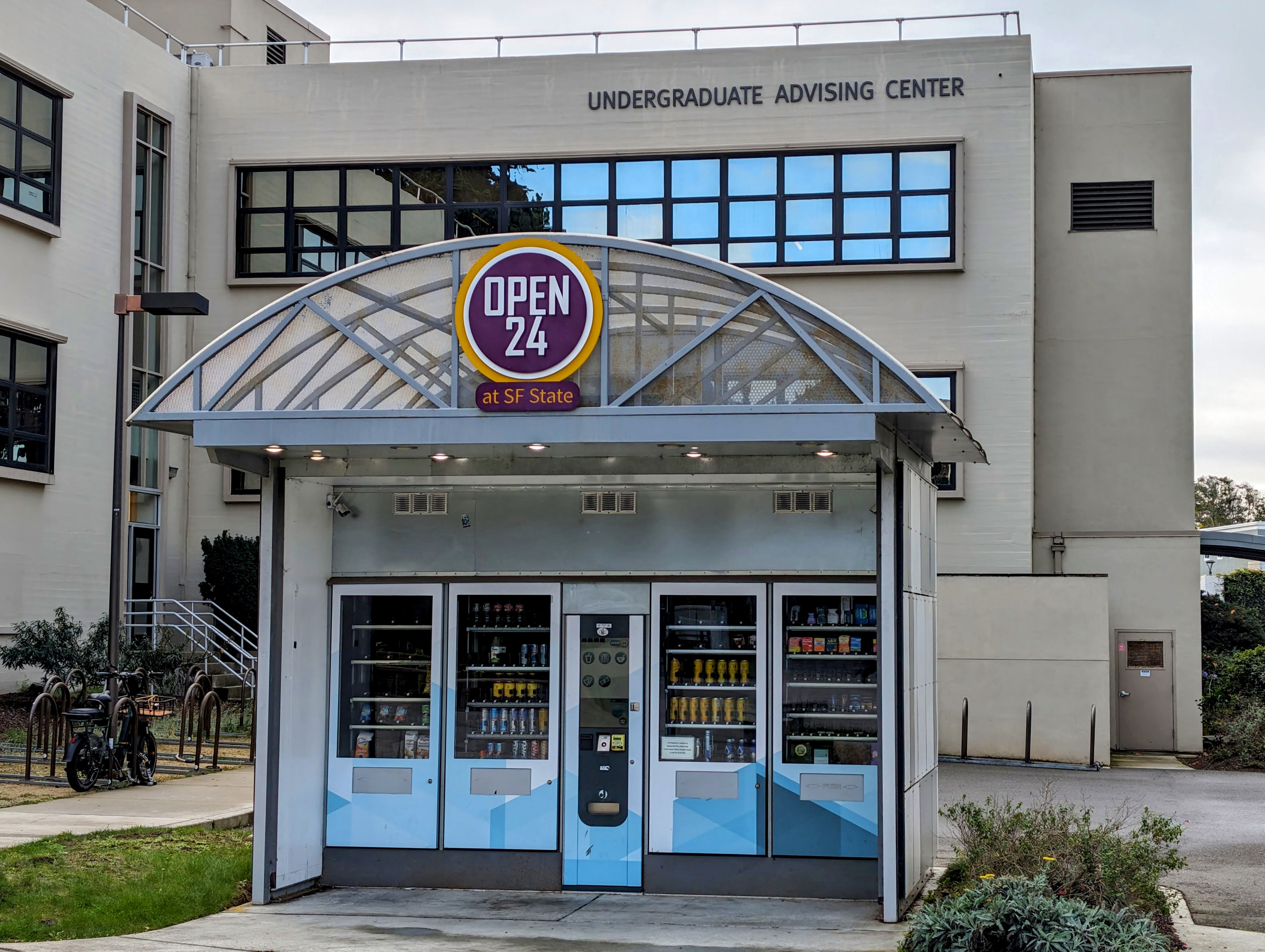
Open24

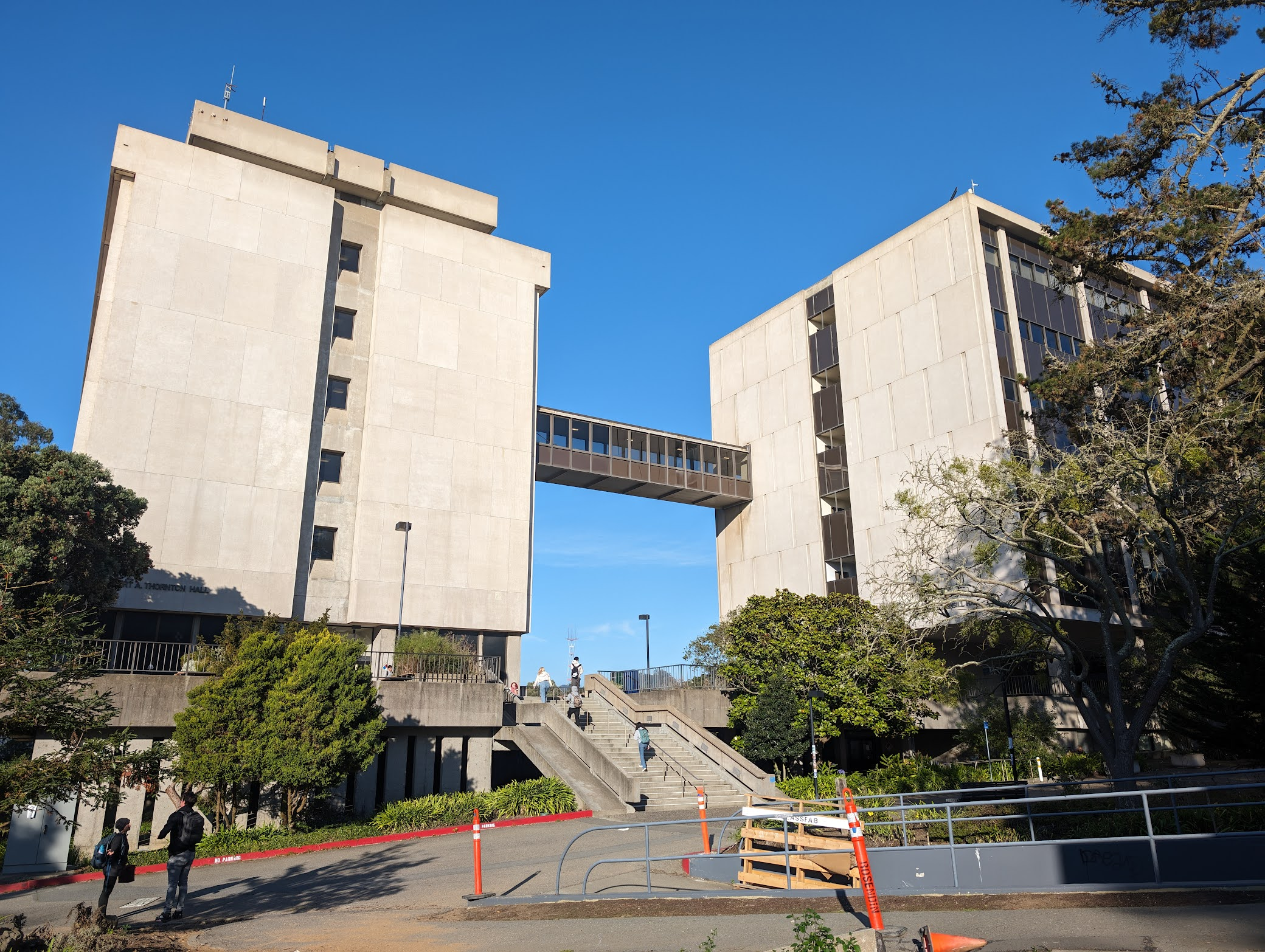
Thornton Hall and Hensill Hall

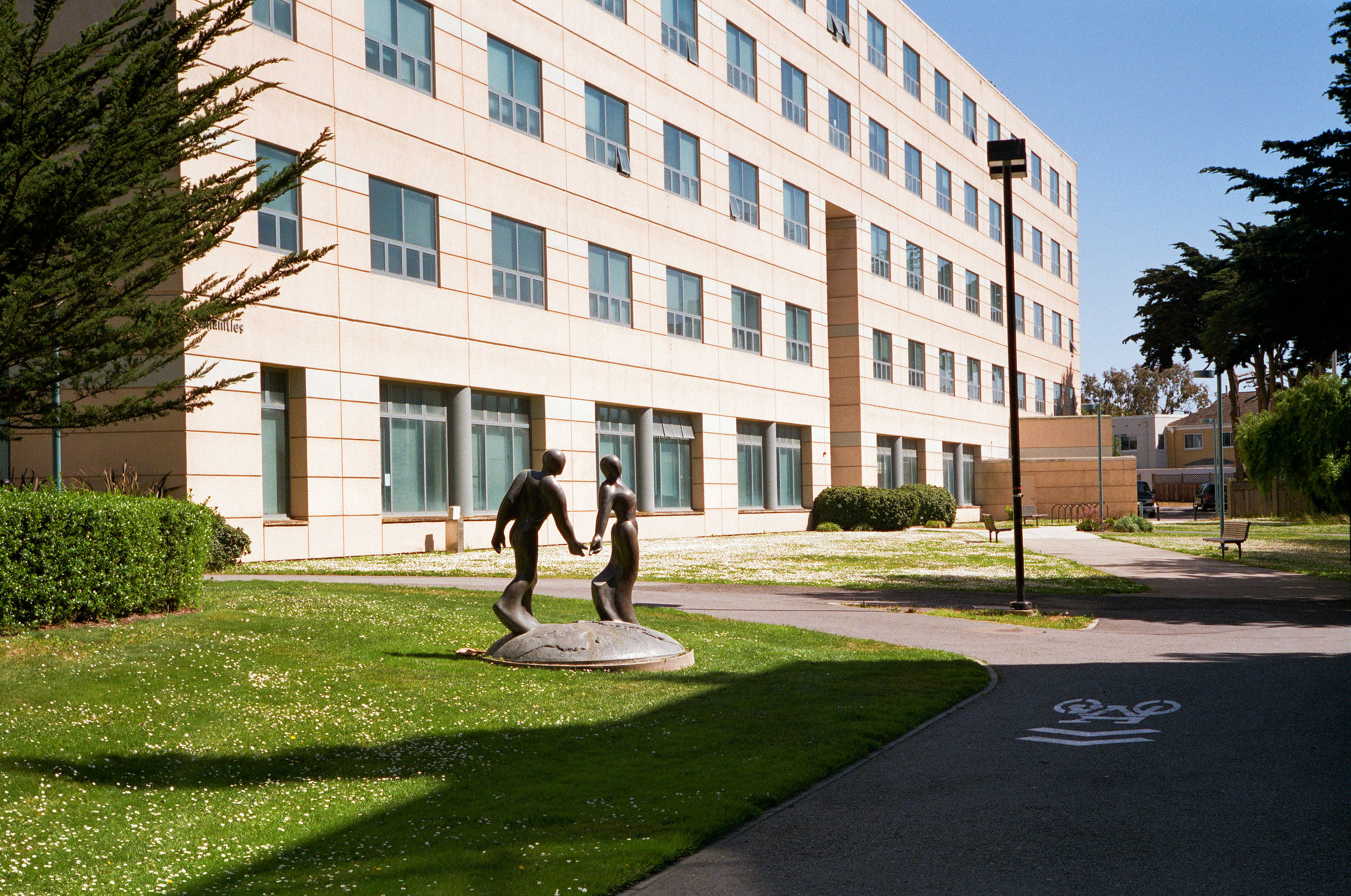
Humanities Building

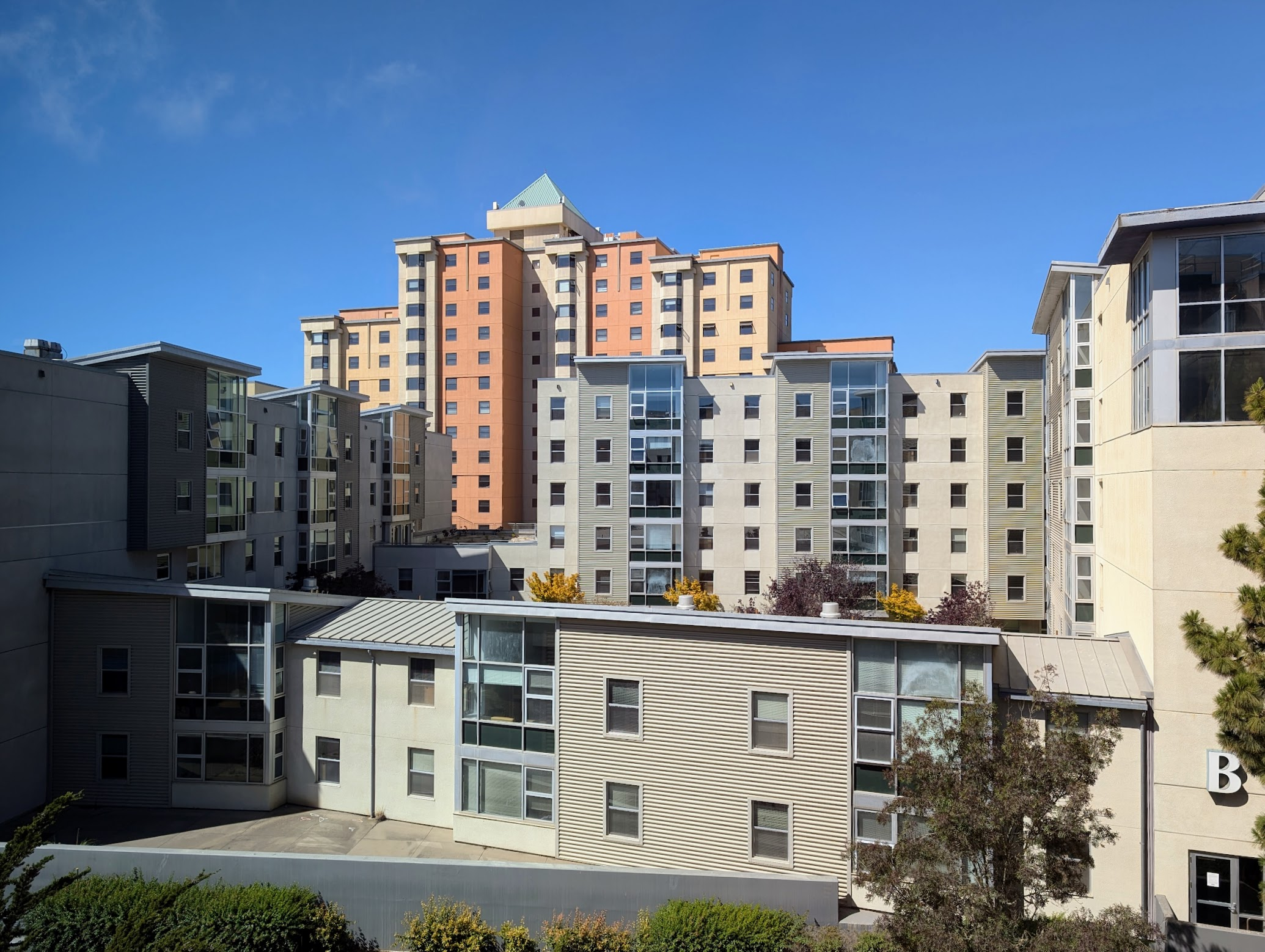
Student housing

=== List of facilities ===
The university uses abbreviations to refer to some buildings and locations at the campus.

==== Academic buildings ====
- Burk Hall (BH)
- Business (BUS)
- Creative Arts (CA)
- Ethnic Studies & Psychology (EP)
- Fine Arts (FA)
- Health & Social Sciences (HSS)
- Hensill Hall (HH)
- Humanities (HUM)
- Liberal and Creative Arts (LCA)
- J. Paul Leonard Library (LIB)
- Science & Engineering Innovation Center (SEC)
- Sutro Library (in LIB)
- Thornton Hall (TH)
- Marcus Hall (MH)

==== Residence buildings, communities, and services ====
- Monarca Dining Hall (DC)
- Manzanita Square (MZS) Manzanita Square provides residential apartments with outdoor courtyards, retail spaces, student support facilities, and laundry services.
- Mary Park Hall (MPH)
- Mary Ward Hall (MWH)
- Towers Junior Suites (TJS)
- The Towers at Centennial Square (TCS)
- The Village at Centennial Square (VCS)
- University Park North (UPN)
- University Park South (UPS)
- West Grove Commons (WGC)
- Yerba Buena Dining Hall

==== Conference and event facilities ====
- Seven Hills Conference Center
- Student Life Events Center/Annex I (SLEC)
- Towers Conference Center (TCONF)

==== Student and administrative services ====
- Administration (ADM)
- Cesar Chavez Student Center (CCSC)
- Corporation Yard (CYD)
- Early Childhood Education Center (formerly Child Care Center) (A.S. ECEC)
- Gator Student Health Center
- Mashouf Wellness Center (MWC)
- Student Services (SSB)

==== Athletic facilities ====
- Cox Stadium
- Gymnasium (GYM)
- Maloney Field
