= California State University police departments =

California State University Police Department
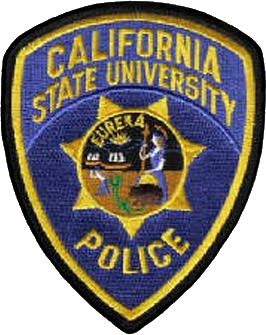

- Abbreviation: CSUPD

Jurisdictional structure
- Operations jurisdiction: California, U.S.
- General nature: Local civilian police

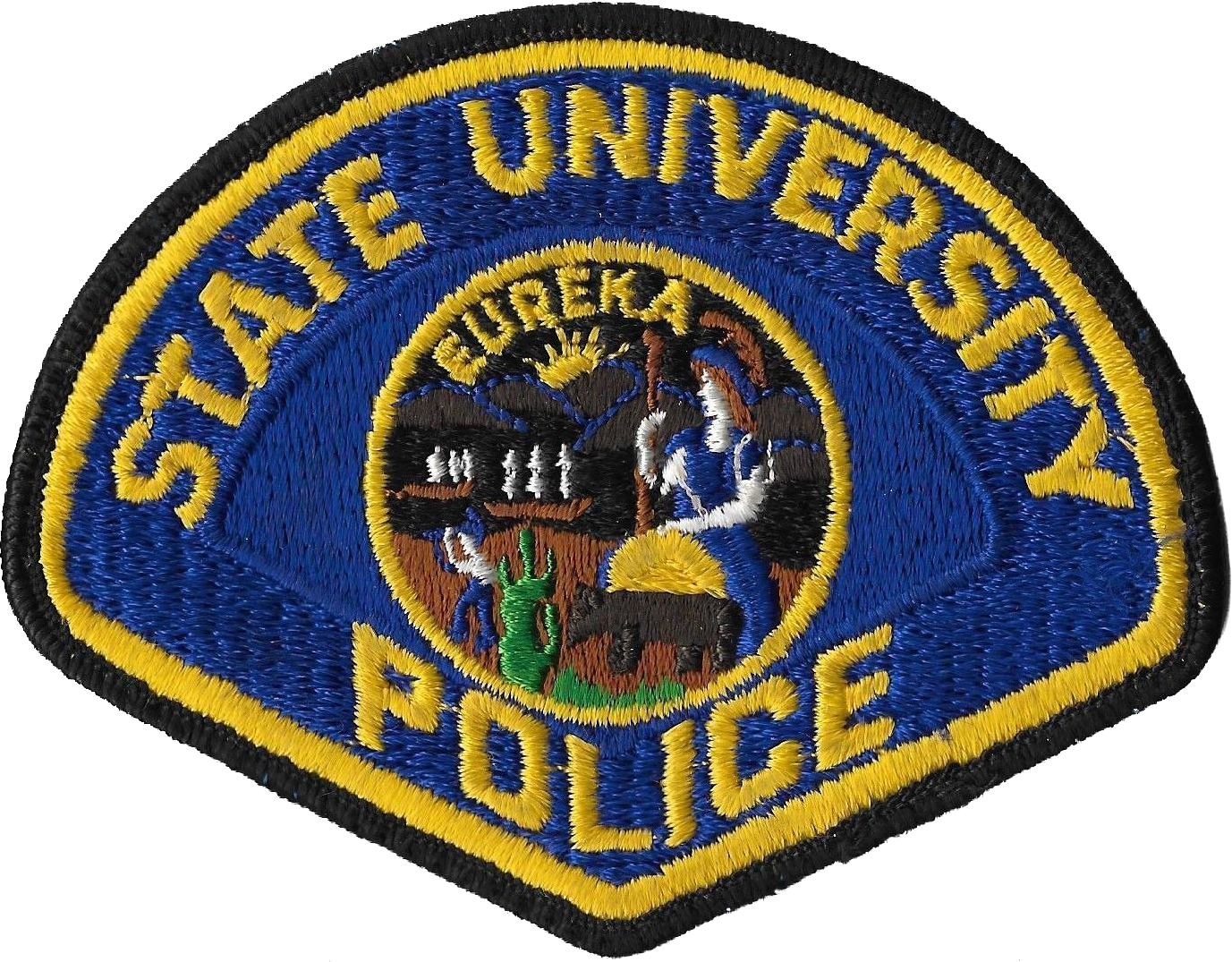
Former patch used in the early 1980s

The California State University police departments (CSUPD) (known within the California State University system as the Cal State Police or University Police) are the police departments of the California State University system. Their police officers are duly sworn peace officers of the State of California, as established by section 830.2(c) of the California Penal Code. There are a total of 23 campuses in the California State University system, each with their own police department. Each campus' police department has its own chain of command; however, some of the policies are system-wide.

Unlike other police departments in the state, there is no single chief of the CSUPD; however there is a central council of chiefs. The council is responsible for ensuring that the various departments are operating within the CSUPD mission. However, the council does not dictate the day-to-day operations of the department, and each department sets its own Standard Operating Policies.

When situations arise on a campus that require more police than the individual department can handle, other CSU police departments can send mutual aid officers to help.

== Authority and jurisdiction ==
The CSUPD is one of several police agencies in California having statewide jurisdiction and authority (other examples include the California Highway Patrol, the University of California Police Department, and the California Department of Fish and Game). CSUPD officers, like most California police officers, are empowered by section 830.2(c) of the California Penal Code, giving them authority as duly sworn peace officers throughout the state of California. As specified by Section 89560 of the California Education Code, their primary jurisdiction extends to the campuses and properties owned by the trustees of the California State University, as well as lands within a one-mile (1.6 km) radius of those campuses.

Almost all of the campuses operate a Community Service Officer (CSO) program, which employs non-sworn students to perform tasks such as building checks and night escorts. Most of the departments also conduct bicycle registrations, "Live Scan" fingerprinting, and lost and found. Additionally, it is possible to have non-moving vehicle citations ("fix-it tickets") signed off at these departments.

== Specialized divisions ==
In addition to CSO programs, CSUPD departments each have a Communications Division, which is the police dispatch center and the 9-1-1 access point for each CSU campus. Each department also staffs a Detective Division to investigate crimes and other cases reported by citizens and the patrol officers.

In addition to these standard police bureaus, several CSUPD departments also staff more specialized police and public safety units. These include: Critical Response Units (CRU), K9 Bomb Squad Units, Crime Prevention Units, Dignitary Protection Units, Mental Health Evaluation Teams (MET), Gang Intelligence Unit, Orange County Regional SWAT team and others.

In 1990, the Jeanne Clery Disclosure of Campus Security Policy and Campus Crime Statistics Act became federal law. This law requires all universities to compile and publish data describing the reported crimes that occurred on campus. The data for specific campuses can be found on the websites listed at the end of this article.

== Individual departments ==
=== CSUPD, Bakersfield ===
California State University Police Department, Bakersfield

Jurisdictional structure
- Legal jurisdiction: State; University

Operational structure
- Agency executive: Maricela Gonzalez, Chief of Police

Website
- http://www.csub.edu/bas/police/

The Cal State Bakersfield Police Department is located in building #60, north of the old gym. The address is 9001 Stockdale Highway, Bakersfield, CA.

=== CSUPD, Channel Islands ===
California State University Police Department, Channel Islands
- Abbreviation: CIPD

Jurisdictional structure
- Legal jurisdiction: State; University
- General nature: Local civilian police

Operational structure
- Sworn members: 14
- Unsworn members: 5
- Agency executive: Drake Massey, Interim Chief of Police

Facilities
- Stations: 1

Website
- http://www.csuci.edu/publicsafety/

The Cal State Channel Islands Police Department is located in Placer Hall, adjacent to the John Spoor Broome Library. The address of the station is 33 Camarillo Street, Camarillo, California 93012.

The command structure consists of the chief of police, police captains, police lieutenants, police sergeants, police corporals, and police officers. Pursuant to Section 89560 of the California Education Code, and because of the various campus-owned facilities throughout the County of Ventura, the primary jurisdiction of the CSUCI Police Department extends well into the city of Camarillo and Thousand Oaks.

CSU Channel Islands Police staffs patrol officers 24 hours a day, 7 days a week, 365 days a year to respond to emergencies and serve the campus community. The sworn officers patrol the campus on foot, bikes, and marked vehicles whilst performing general and specialized law enforcement duties, conducts investigations, enforces laws and traffic regulations and collisions, makes arrests, crowd control, safety hazards, administering medical aid to injured persons, fire emergencies in conjunction with other emergency service providers, conducts crime prevention and community policing program activities, and also provides information and assistance to the general public.

The communications division staffs 6 9-1-1 police dispatchers that handles 9-1-1 calls 24 hours a day, 7 days a week, 365 days a year from within the County of Ventura as well as calls from the Ventura County Community College District's campuses of Oxnard College, Ventura College, and Moorpark College.

In addition to standard patrol operations, the agency employs unsworn student community service officers. The agency also maintains various Blue Emergency Phones throughout the campus and surrounding areas as a go-to for any emergencies in the nearby vicinity.

=== CSUPD, Chico ===
California State University Police Department, Chico
- Motto: Providing a safe environment for our campus community through proactive, progressive and professional law enforcement services.

Jurisdictional structure
- Legal jurisdiction: State; University

Operational structure
- Sworn members: 14
- Unsworn members: 16
- Agency executive: Chris Nicodemus, Chief of Police

Facilities
- Stations: 1

Website
- http://www.csuchico.edu/up/

The CSU Chico Police Department is located adjacent to Parking Structure 2. The street address is 218 Normal Ave, Chico, CA.

=== CSUPD, Dominguez Hills ===
California State University Police Department, Dominguez Hills

Jurisdictional structure
- Legal jurisdiction: State; University

Operational structure
- Agency executive: Carlos Velez, Chief of Police

Website
- http://www.csudh.edu/dhpd/

The CSU, Dominguez Hills Police Department is located in Welch Hall, room B100. The mailing address for the department is 1000 E Victoria St, WH B100, Carson, CA.

=== CSUPD, East Bay ===
California State University Police Department, East Bay

Jurisdictional structure
- Legal jurisdiction: State; University

Operational structure
- Agency executive: Omar Miakhail, Chief of Police

Website
- http://www20.csueastbay.edu/af/departments/upd/

The CSU, East Bay Police Department is located at 25800 Carlos Bee Blvd, LI 1063, Hayward, CA.

=== CSUPD, Fresno ===
California State University Police Department, Fresno
- Motto: Spirit, Service, Solutions

Agency overview
- Formed: 1962

Jurisdictional structure
- Legal jurisdiction: State; University

Operational structure
- Sworn members: 27
- Unsworn members: 36 full time 45 students
- Agency executive: Anthony Martinez, Interim Chief of Police
- Units: Community Service Specialists

Website
- http://www.fresnostate.edu/adminserv/police/

The CSU, Fresno Police Department was founded in 1962. In addition to law enforcement, the Fresno department administers Traffic Operations (parking enforcement & traffic control). CSUPD-Fresno is located at 2311 East Barstow Avenue, MS/PO14, Fresno, CA. Command structure consists of The Chief of Police, two Lieutenants, six Sergeants and 18 Police Officers. In addition to standard patrol operations, the agency staffs two full-time Police Detectives.

=== CSUPD, Fullerton ===
California State University Police Department, Fullerton

Jurisdictional structure
- Legal jurisdiction: State; University

Operational structure
- Sworn members: 27 (including the Chief of Police)
- Unsworn members: 6 Full-Time Police Dispatchers; 3 Part-Time Police Dispatchers
- Agency executive: Anthony Frisbee, Chief of Police
- Units: 29 Community Service Officers; 3 Investigators; 2 Motor Officers

Website
- http://police.fullerton.edu

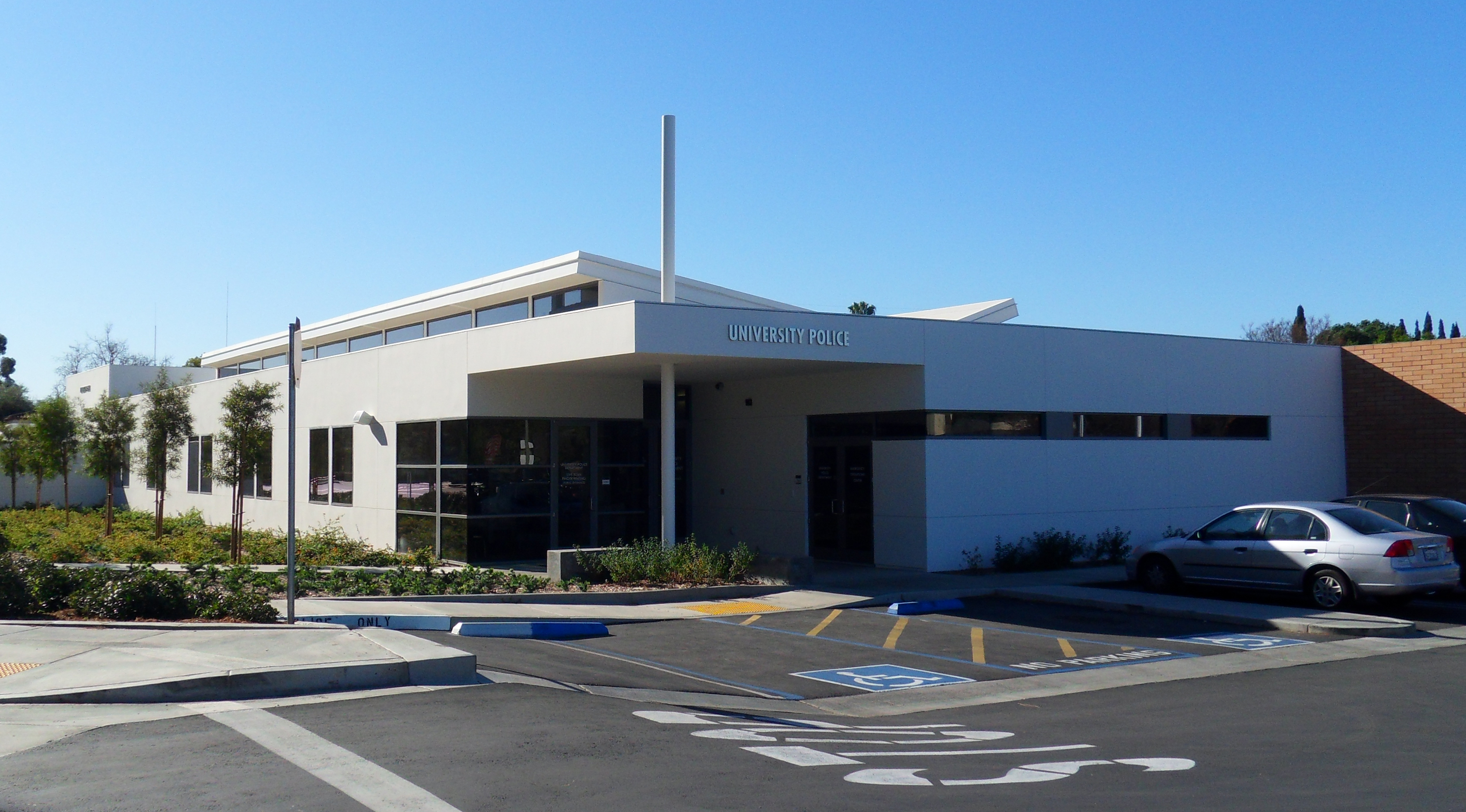

The CSU, Fullerton Police Department is located in building UPD on the corner of State College Blvd. and Gymnasium Drive, at 800 N. State College Blvd. in Fullerton, CA. Its command structure consists of The Chief of Police, two Police Captains, and five sergeants. Pursuant to section 89560 of the California Education Code, and because of the various campus owned facilities throughout the County of Orange, the primary jurisdiction of the CSUF Police Department extends well into the cities of Fullerton, Placentia, and Irvine. CSU Fullerton Police staffs patrol officers and 9-1-1 police dispatchers 24/7, 365 days a year. In addition to standard patrol operations, the agency maintains three full-time Police Detectives in the Investigations Bureau, three officers that collaborate as a Gang Intelligence Unit to assist surrounding agencies, and several officers on the North Orange County Regional SWAT team. The communications division staffs 6 full-time, and 4 part-time police dispatchers.

In November 2012, in response to an increasing number of traffic collisions and traffic injuries on and near the campus, the department created a Traffic Enforcement Unit with the purchase of a police motorcycle and currently staffs one full-time police officer in the position of motor officer.

=== CSUPD, Humboldt ===
California State University Police Department, Humboldt

Jurisdictional structure
- Legal jurisdiction: State; University

Operational structure
- Sworn members: 10
- Unsworn members: 14
- Agency executive: Greg Allen, Chief of Police

Website
- http://humboldt.edu/police/

The CSU, Humboldt Police Department is located at #1 Harpst Street, Arcata, CA. This is also known as the Student & Business Services Building, 1st floor, Room 101.

=== CSUPD, Long Beach ===
California State University Police Department, Long Beach
- Motto: Excellence Everyday

Jurisdictional structure
- Legal jurisdiction: State; University

Operational structure
- Sworn members: 24
- Agency executive: Carol Almaguer, Interim Chief of Police

Website
- http://daf.csulb.edu/offices/ppfm/police/

The CSULB Police Department is located at 1250 Bellflower Blvd. in the City of Long Beach, California. The Police Department is located in the brick building south of the Student Recreation and Wellness Center.

=== CSUPD, Los Angeles ===
California State University Police Department, Los Angeles

Agency overview
- Formed: 1974

Jurisdictional structure
- Legal jurisdiction: State; University

Operational structure
- Sworn members: 18
- Agency executive: Larry Bohannon, Chief of Police

Website
- http://www.calstatela.edu/univ/police/

The California State University Los Angeles Police Department is located at 5151 State University Drive, Los Angeles, CA. The Police Department has 21 authorized police officer positions. Cops patrol the campus on foot, bikes, motorcycles, and marked vehicles. Officers are available 24-hours a day, seven days a week to respond to emergencies and serve the campus community. The CSULA University Police department became a nationally accredited agency in November 2001.

California State University Police Department, Cal Poly Solano Campus

Jurisdictional structure
- Legal jurisdiction: State; University

Operational structure
- Sworn members: 7
- Unsworn members: 7
- Agency executive: Lee Rankin, Deputy Chief

Website
- http://www.csum.edu/web/police-services/home

=== CSUPD, Cal Poly Solano Campus ===
The Cal Poly Solano Campus Police Department is located at 200 Maritime Academy Drive Vallejo, CA 94590

=== CSUPD, Monterey Bay ===
California State University Police Department, Monterey Bay

Jurisdictional structure
- Legal jurisdiction: State; University

Operational structure
- Sworn members: 14
- Agency executive: Yvonne Gordon, Interim Chief of Police

Website
- https://csumb.edu/police/

California State University, Monterey Bay is located in the City of Seaside, California. The California State University Monterey Bay Police Department conducts police services in and around the university campus.

Police Administration personnel consist of non-sworn personnel in addition to sworn police officers such as the Chief, Commander, and Patrol Sergeant or Watch Commander. Non-sworn personnel provide for administrative support, records-keeping, and property/evidence management.

CSUMB police officers are on-duty 24 hours, available at any time to respond to reports of criminal activity, suspicious circumstances, traffic collisions, safety hazards, and medical and fire emergencies in conjunction with other emergency service providers. Police officers possess the same power, authority, and training as municipal, county, and state law enforcement officers.

California State University Monterey Bay Police Department is bordered by jurisdictions from the Seaside Police Department, Marina Police Department, Monterey County Sheriff's Office, California Highway Patrol, Presidio of Monterey Police Department and United States Army Military Police.

=== CSUPD, Northridge ===
California State University Police Department, Northridge

Jurisdictional structure
- Legal jurisdiction: State; University

Operational structure
- Agency executive: Alfredo Fernandez, Chief of Police

Website
- http://www-admn.csun.edu/dps/police/

=== CSUPD, Pomona ===
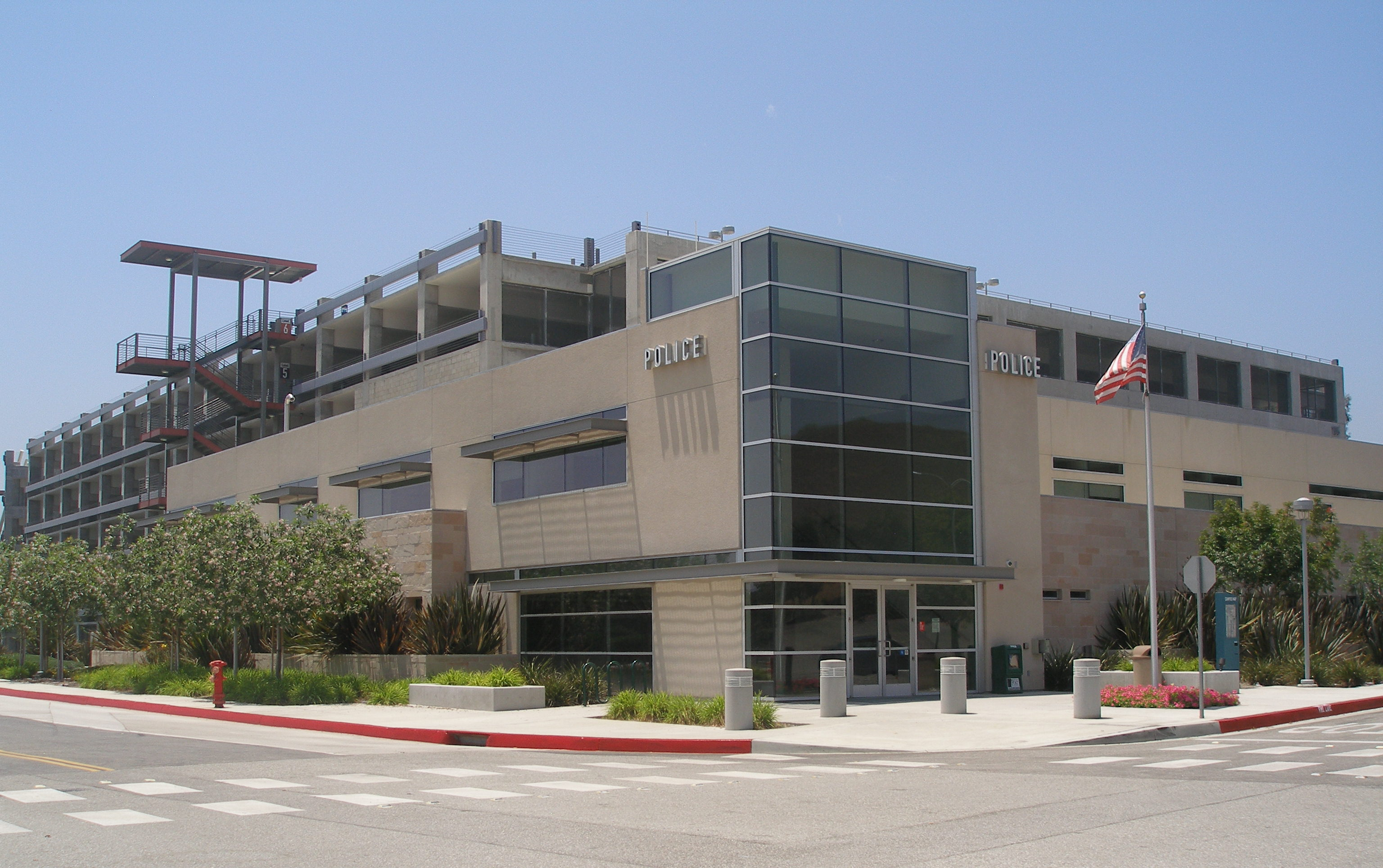
Police office at Cal Poly Pomona.

California State University Police Department, Pomona

Jurisdictional structure
- Legal jurisdiction: State; University

Operational structure
- Agency executive: Linh Dinh, Chief of Police

Website
- http://www.cpp.edu/~police/

This department protects the people and property of Cal Poly Pomona, the second largest land-holding university in the California State University.

=== CSUPD, Sacramento ===
6000 J Street Sacramento CA

California State University Police Department, Sacramento

Jurisdictional structure
- Legal jurisdiction: State; University

Operational structure
- Agency executive: Chet Madison, Chief of Police

Website
- http://www.csus.edu/aba/police/

=== CSUPD, San Bernardino ===
California State University Police Department, San Bernardino

Jurisdictional structure
- Legal jurisdiction: State; University

Operational structure
- Sworn members: 18
- Agency executive: John Brockie, Interim Chief of Police

Facilities
- Stations: 1

Website
- http://police.csusb.edu/

=== CSUPD, San Diego ===
San Diego State University Police Department
- Motto: Commitment to Safety and Service

Jurisdictional structure
- Legal jurisdiction: State; University

Operational structure
- Sworn members: 21
- Unsworn members: 22 full-time(Dispatch/Records/Parking Services), 20 student workers(CSO's)
- Agency executive: Gregory Murphy, Chief of Police

Facilities
- Stations: 1

Website
- http://www.dps.sdsu.edu/

The SDSU Police Department is located on campus in the Public Safety Building, 55th Street and Remington Road, San Diego, CA 92182-4390.

=== CSUPD, San Francisco ===
California State University Police Department, San Francisco

Jurisdictional structure
- Legal jurisdiction: State; University

Operational structure
- Sworn members: 39
- Agency executive: Reggie Parson, Chief of Police

Website
- http://www.sfsu.edu/~upd/index.html

=== CSUPD, San José ===
California State University Police Department, San José
- Motto: We make a difference today for a better tomorrow.

Agency overview
- Formed: 1975

Jurisdictional structure
- Legal jurisdiction: State; University

Operational structure
- Sworn members: 32
- Agency executive: Michael Carroll, Chief of Police

Website
- http://www.sjsu.edu/police/

Prior to the establishment of a police department at San José State University, the university employed night watchmen and security guards. The San José Police Department provided law enforcement for the campus during this time. Beginning in the 1970s, the university began to hire sworn police officers. On October 1, 1975, the university established the police department, providing 24-hour law enforcement. In 1975, SJSU-PD was recognized by the California Commission on Police Officers Standards and Training. SJSU-PD currently has 32 sworn members, including the chief of police, 2 captains, 2 lieutenants, 8 sergeants, 6 corporals and 13 officers. SJSU-PD has a Memorandum of Understanding with the San Jose Police Department that outlines geographical boundaries and jurisdictional duties, as well as policies on mutual aid.

The SJSU Police Department is located at One Washington Square, San Jose, CA.

=== CSUPD, San Luis Obispo ===
California State University Police Department, San Luis Obispo
- Motto: Protecting Our Future

Jurisdictional structure
- Legal jurisdiction: State; University

Operational structure
- Sworn members: 20
- Unsworn members: 25
- Agency executive: Rob Plastino, Chief of Police
- Units: 55 Community Service Officers

Facilities
- Stations: 1

Website
- http://www.afd.calpoly.edu/police/

This department protects the people and property of California Polytechnic State University, the largest land-holding universities in the California State University. Their motto is "Protecting Our Future". The mission of the University Police Department at Cal Poly is to promote a safe and secure learning environment by maintaining order, enforcing laws, and providing professional police, emergency, parking, and access services.

The department is located in Building 36, at North Perimeter and Safety Way.

=== CSUPD, San Marcos ===
California State University Police Department, San Marcos

Jurisdictional structure
- Legal jurisdiction: State; University

Operational structure
- Agency executive: Jesse Flores, Chief of Police

Website
- http://www.csusm.edu/police/

=== CSUPD, Sonoma ===
California State University Police Department, Sonoma

Jurisdictional structure
- Legal jurisdiction: State; University

Operational structure
- Sworn members: 15
- Unsworn members: 1
- Agency executive: Nader Oweis, Chief of Police

Website
- http://www.sonoma.edu/ps/

=== CSUPD, Stanislaus ===
California State University Police Department, Stanislaus

Jurisdictional structure
- Legal jurisdiction: State; University

Operational structure
- Agency executive: Steve Olson, Chief of Police

Website
- http://www.csustan.edu/upd/

== Fallen officers ==
Since the establishment of the California State University Police Department, 2 officers have died in the line of duty. The following officers were from the Hayward (now East Bay) campus.

Officer	Date of death	Details
Police Officer Stanley Henney	Tuesday, May 31, 1977	Gunfire
Police Officer Gary Hart	Wednesday, June 1, 1977	Gunfire

== See also ==
- University of California Police Department

== Significant events ==
- Operation Sudden Fall
