= Operation Sudden Fall =

2008 American drug enforcement action in San Diego

- Operation name: Operation Sudden Fall
- Type: Drug Enforcement

Participants
- Executed by: Drug Enforcement Administration; San Diego State University (SDSU) campus police

Mission
- Target: Campus drugs

Timeline
- Date begin: December 2007
- Date end: May 6, 2008
- Duration: 5 months

Results
- Arrests: 33
- Miscellaneous results: 2kg cocaine, 350 ecstasy pills, other drugs, guns and $60,000 cash seized

Operation Sudden Fall was a 2008 joint operation between the United States Drug Enforcement Administration (DEA) and San Diego State University (SDSU) campus police investigating drug abuse in the College Area of San Diego, California. It was the largest campus drug bust in San Diego County history and one of the largest college drug busts in U.S. history.

== Background ==
The sting operation was triggered by the overdose death of a 19-year-old female student, who died of a cocaine overdose on May 6, 2007. Another student, from Mesa College, died of an oxycodone overdose on February 26, 2008, while the covert investigation was being conducted. SDSU campus police, initially investigating alone, invited the DEA and the San Diego County District Attorney's office to get involved in the operation starting in December 2007, after the department became overwhelmed by the leads they uncovered.

== Results of sting ==
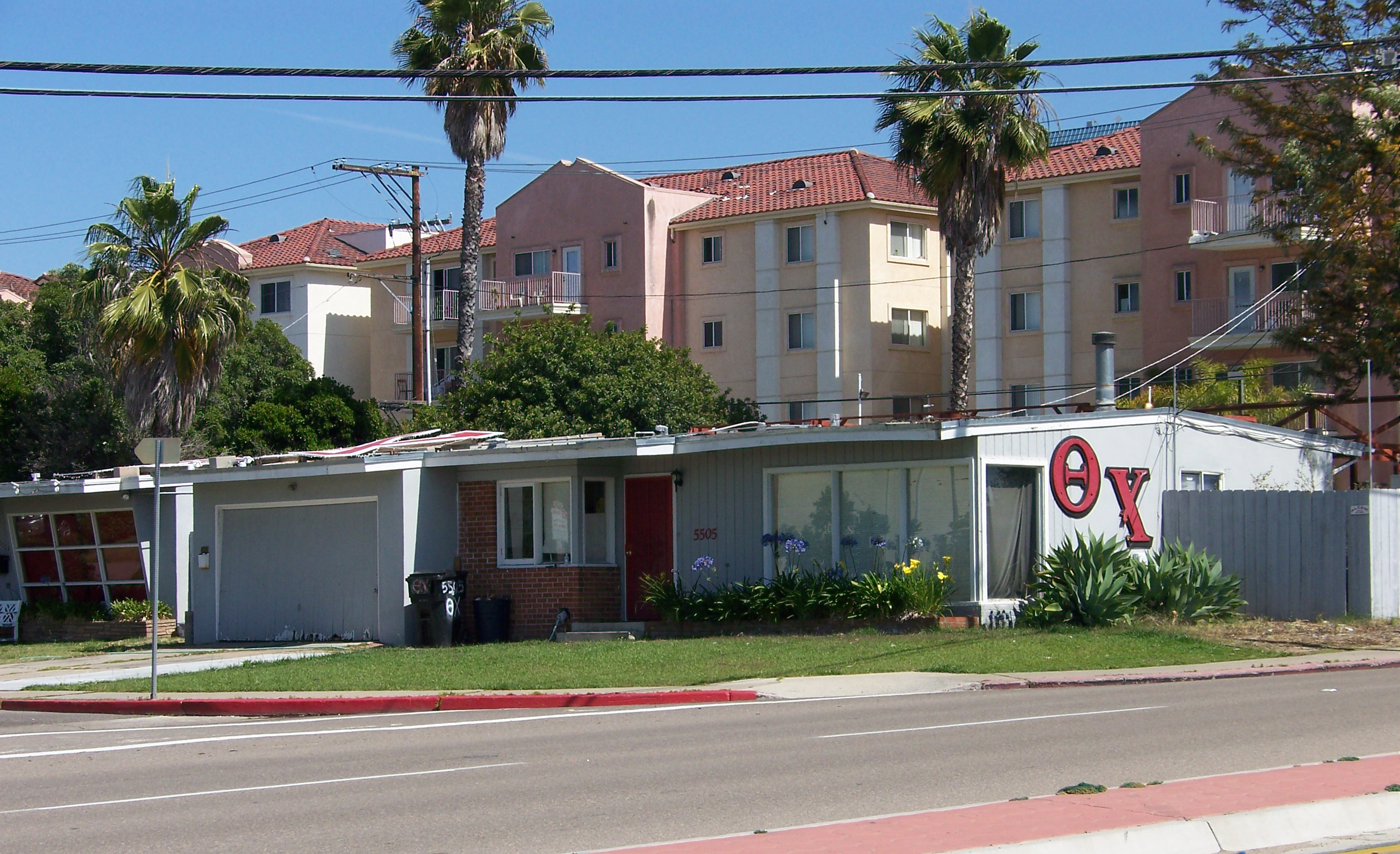
The old Theta Chi fraternity house in May 2008.

On May 6, 2008, San Diego State University Police in collaboration with the Drug Enforcement Administration culminated a year-long investigation into drug abuse in the college area with a series of early morning raids at several residences in the college area. The DEA initially announced the arrests of 96 individuals, of whom 75 were San Diego State University students, (many of them interns at Adobe Systems Incorporated) on a variety of drug charges. One day later, on May 7, SDSU officials stated that only 33 were students, and that the inflated numbers issued originally included all drug-related arrests made over the course of the year-long investigation, many of which were months before the raid and most cases for simple possession.

In total, two kilograms of cocaine were seized, along with 350 ecstasy pills, 50 pounds of marijuana, psychedelic mushrooms, hash oil, methamphetamine, illicit prescription drugs, other drug paraphernalia, three guns, and $60,000 in cash. The day of the sting, SDSU president Stephen Weber spoke at a news conference, while authorities identified 22 SDSU students as drug dealers who sold to undercover agents, and 17 others that had supplied the drugs. The rest of the suspects apparently bought or possessed illegal drugs. Authorities further found that those arrested included students in the campus's Homeland Security and Criminal Justice programs.

Students belonging to campus fraternities were also among those arrested as result of the operation. In the immediate aftermath of the sting, the university placed six of its fraternity chapters on interim suspensions, as each had one or more members or former members arrested as result of the investigation.

Some student groups, including SDSU group "Students for Sensible Drug Policy," protested the arrests, especially SDSU's decision to involve the DEA, a federal agency, in the operation. In addition, they urged the university to adopt a "Good Samaritan" policy that would allow students in an overdose situation to call for help without fear of repercussions.

On May 15, SDSU Vice President for Student Affairs James Kitchen announced that the interim suspensions for three of the fraternities had been lifted after an administrative review found that those arrested in connection to the controlled substances investigation were either inactive/former members of the fraternity and/or were not presently residents of chapter houses.

On November 22, SDSU announced that Phi Kappa Psi had been suspended for 18 months and Theta Chi had been suspended for four years.

== Sentencing ==
Several months after the May 6 announcement, it was reported that the majority of the defendants had pleaded guilty to the felony charges. The defendants were then either placed on probation or were required to enter drug diversion programs. Other defendants only received citations or had their cases dismissed.

== See also ==
- California State University Police Department
