= John Spoor Broome Library =

Library at California State University, Channel Islands

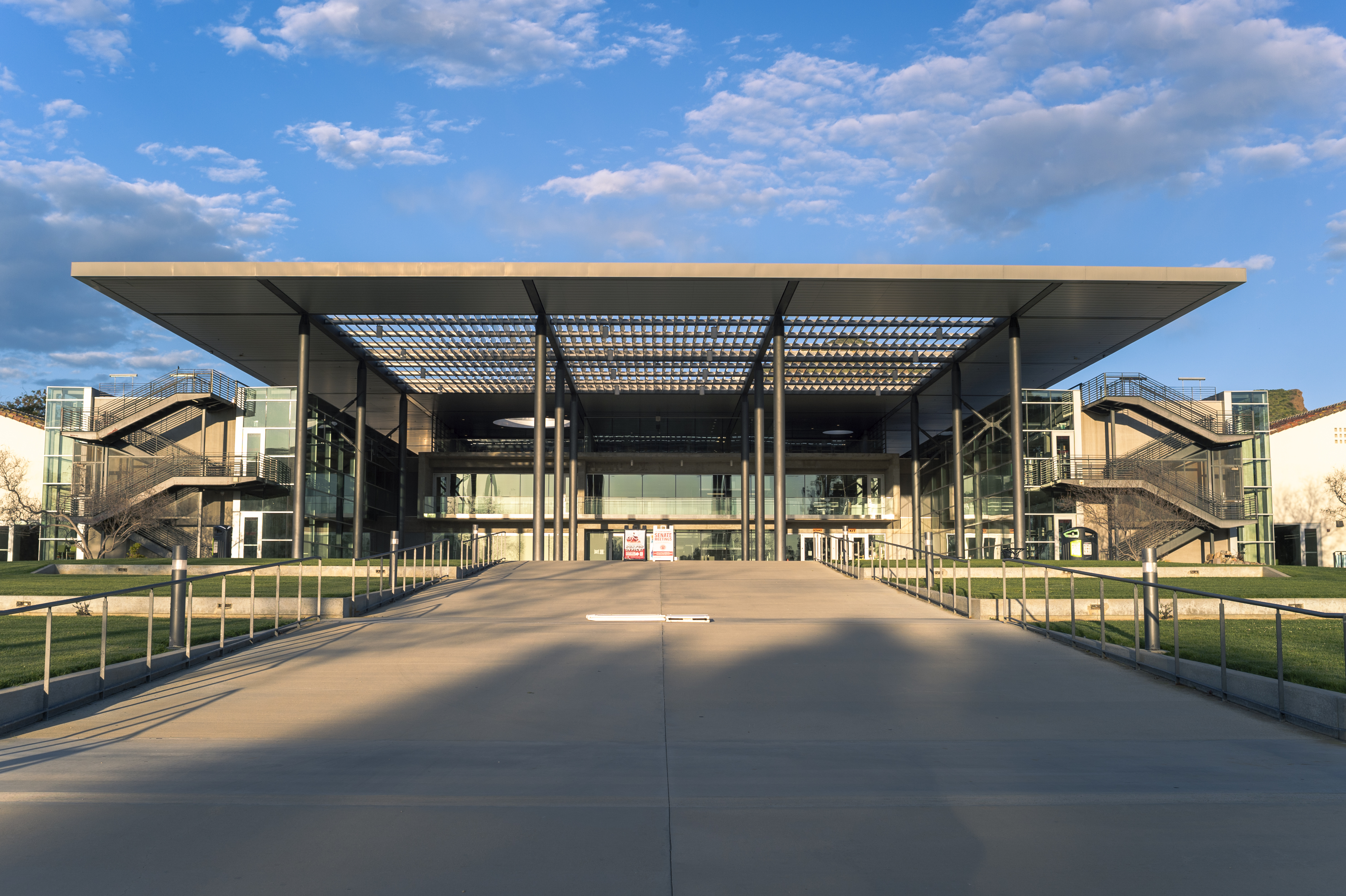
- 34.16268°N 119.04094°W
- Location: Camarillo, California, United States
- Established: April 2008
- Branch of: California State University, Channel Islands

The John Spoor Broome Library is located on the campus of California State University, Channel Islands (CSUCI) in Camarillo, California, United States.

The library formally opened on April 4, 2008.

== Mission statement ==
"The John Spoor Broome Library enhances the CI mission of interdisciplinary, international, multicultural, and service learning through active collaboration with students, faculty, and staff to plan, implement, promote, and access the use of collections and services and support student learning via its robust information literacy program."

== History ==
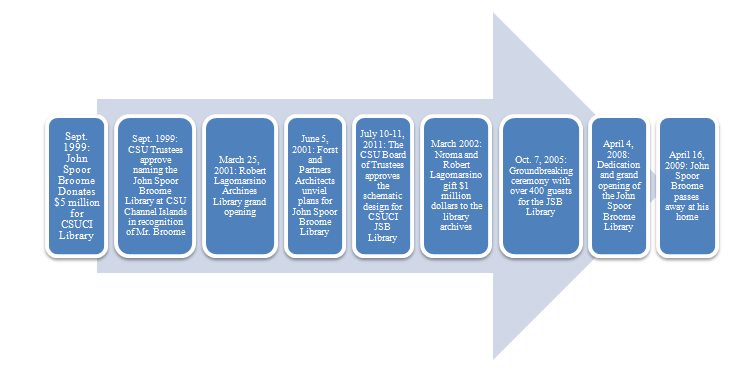
A timeline for the John Spoor Broome Library

The John Spoor Broome Library is a new building that incorporated some of the original but renovated buildings that were part of the former California State Mental Hospital. The project involved the demolition of the former Administration building and the modification of the Receiving and Treatment center to make room for the new facility.

== Architecture ==
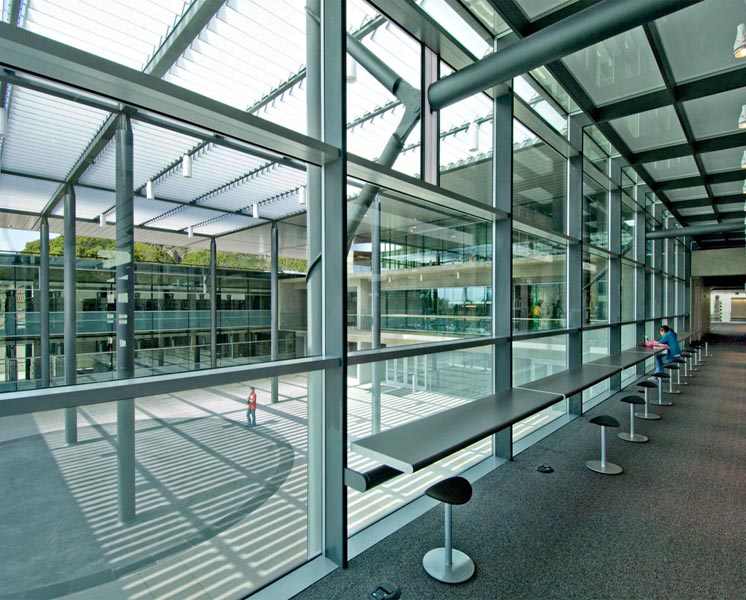
Second floor, mverlooking Main entrance

The John Spoor Broome Library was designed by the British architect Norman Foster. The executive architect was Leo A. Daly's Los Angeles architecture firm.

The library is the only "modern"-style building on campus, while the other buildings are of Mission Revival and Spanish Colonial Revival architecture. It features a naturally lit "buffer zone", which separates existing and new structures. The surrounding environment is showcased in 360-degree views. It consists of two separate pieces: the physical structure itself and the canopy above, which extends from the plaza over the library and is anchored to the foundation through eight steel posts visible in the Reading Room. The Reading Room features a thermally insulated glass canopy. In the plaza, the canopy is louvered, thus filtering light through the plaza, while not allowing the sun to make direct contact with the book stacks. The stacks are visible from any vantage point. Just outside the main doors is the Reflection Pool. The library serves as a direct axis point through campus, both north & south and east & west.

According to the Channel Islands university website, the John Spoor Broome Library is 137,000 square feet, in three stories, and cost $56 million. There are two main floors in which there are computers, books, tables and classrooms. The third floor is an outdoor study area. The construction required 7,000 cubic yards of concrete, 300 tons of structural steel, 600 tons of rebar and 40,000 square feet of glass. The architect is Gruen Associates, of Los Angeles. The construction firm was PCL, Los Angeles.

== Donors ==
The John Spoor Broome Library was named after the Ventura County philanthropist who donated $5 million to the project.

Broome, a sportsman, pilot, farmer and rancher in Ventura, Kern, and Monterey counties, had made the gift anonymously, solely out of a sense of joy over the opening of a long-delayed four-year institution in Ventura County. Only later did the university president, Handel Evans, convince him to permit the celebration of the gift, and only then because they thought it might help motivate another potential donor, said to have been Broome's friend Martin V. Smith. Smith later donated an identical amount to the business school that now bears his name. The university is on part of the Rancho Guadalasca Spanish land grant that had belonged to Broome's grandfather.

Robert J. Lagomarsino, an Ojai resident and U.S. congressman from 1974 to 1993, and his wife Norma, donated $1 million for the new library. The donation was to be used to bolster archives and special collections and host an annual lecture.

== Archives ==
The John Spoor Broome Library holds a few archives that are available to its students as well as the general public. Two archives of importance include the Robert J. Lagomarsino Federal Collection and the Camarillo State Hospital Collection.

== Robert Lagomarsino Collection ==
=== Biography ===
As noted by archivist Evelyn Taylor at CSUCI, Robert J. Lagomarsino, a Ventura County native, represented the counties of Ventura and Santa Barbara by serving as a California state senator from 1961 to 1974 and as a United States representative from 1974 to 1992. These years coincided with the time in which both Governors Brown and Reagan were active. During his service as a United States Congressman, Lagomarsino was a member of two major House Committees: the Foreign Affairs Committee and the Committee on Interior and Insular Affairs. He was also asked by the House Leader to chair a task force to analyze and develop recommendations to the system of selection of standing committee assignments, the Committee on Committees.

=== Collection ===
In this collection, all of Lagomarsino's services to California are documented. The collection not only contains documents on Lagomarsino and early Ventura, but also original furniture, artifacts, signed photographs, and other memorabilia from government officials and celebrities. Additional original archival material includes documents reporting information on the Watergate scandal, the Challenger space shuttle incident, and original signed letters from the Nixon and Bush administrations. As a whole, the collection reflects the conflicts and changes of the time, and also displays Lagomarsino's contributions to Ventura County. This contribution in particular was the introduction of Senate Bill Number 70 which requested a state university for Ventura County (now CSUCI).

The Lagomarsino Collection not only benefits students and scholars interested in politics or history, but also provides valuable primary resource material for such areas of study as agriculture, economics, education, environment, civil rights, crime, family concerns, foreign affairs, health interests, labor law, trade, transportation, and veterans' affairs.

== Camarillo State Hospital Collection ==
=== History ===
According to archivist Evelyn Taylor from CSUCI, the State of California purchased the former Lewis Ranch from agriculturists Adolpho Camarillo and Joseph P. Lewis, to build the Camarillo State Hospital in 1929. George McDougall was immediately put in charge of the State's architectural plans. In 1933 the hospital began accepting male patients, who in the beginning, were held in the former Lewis Ranch farmhouse. The hospital was eventually reconstructed under the WPA to accommodate both male and female patients. In 1936, it emerged as the largest mental hospital in the world. Between 1947 and 1957, the hospital rapidly grew, incorporating men, women, and children of all ages, eventually reaching over 7,000 patients at its peak. By 1967, the hospital was treating illnesses such as schizophrenia, manic depression, organic brain disease, autism, and birth defects, and would later successfully address drug and alcohol abuse.

Its early years were rather isolated from the outside world, sustaining the hospital community using its own farms; butcher; shoe maker, dairy; ice house; schools; and hospital, police, and fire departments. In time, various services that promoted social interaction were established, such as a bowling alley, swimming pool, clothing store, petting zoo, beauty parlor, and hamburger shop.

A new law regarding involuntary treatment of mental patients was put into action in 1969. The law required judicial review of every patient who was held against their will for an extended period of time, which in turn, led to the decrease of mental patients at the hospital.

However, in 1983, a new approach was put into action. Discoveries of new drugs that would help the mentally disabled lead normal lives were uncovered and the hospital began to utilize these innovations. A new mission statement emerged as the hospital, now under the Department of Developmental Services of the State of California, addressed both mental and developmentally disabling illnesses: "Enhancing independence through innovation". The hospital now focused on treating patients with the intention of releasing them successfully back into society.

After a long and successful treatment record, the hospital closed its doors to the public on June 30, 1996, due to lack of patients and cost per capita.

=== Collection ===
The Camarillo State Hospital collection consists primarily of documents, photographs, and unique artifacts. Many collection items are direct work-product items created during the hospital's tenure, until its closing in 1996. The material is classified by date (1836–2007) and general topic (e.g. treatment). Each of the eleven boxes in the collection includes primary sources such as newspaper articles, correspondence, manuals, memos, proposals, speeches, trailers, and information on movies filmed on the land and books written about the hospital. Old Camarillo State Hospital newspaper articles can be found in the Los Angeles Times Historical Database.

Although the archives in this collection provide first-hand knowledge and useful information about the Camarillo State Hospital, due to California state law no personal records or confidential information is allowed to be released to anyone other than the subject, without authorization. For more information contact the California Department of Developmental Services.

== Services ==
The John Spoor Broome Library offers a variety of services and events to current and prospective students, staff and faculty, and the general public. At the University Writing Center, students can find help and advice from peers on developing a proper essay or paper. The IT Help Desk offers assistance with technical problems. A GIS lab with three computers that obtain the proper ArcGIS software and computer and printing privileges may be accessed with a student ID. The library holds a total of 130 hardwired computers for students, faculty & staff, and printers are located all around the building. Students and faculty & staff can check out laptops, digital cameras, digital video cameras, flip video cameras, digital tape recorders, and projection units. The library has DVD's, VHS's, CD's, and best sellers. The children's section holds many children's books and collections. Study rooms which can be reserved by groups at any time throughout the academic year.

Students can obtain jobs at the John Spoor Broome library in different departments, including the IT help desk, the University Writing Center, and the front desk.

== Events ==
The library holds events throughout the year that the community, staff & faculty, and students can participate in. Events hosted by the John Spoor Broome library include the Art Walk outside the library, art exhibits held inside the John Spoor Broome library, and Children's Reading Celebration. Every fall the library hosts a Dia de los Muertos celebration in which an exhibit is created to commemorate the tradition and for visitors to learn about the history of the culture. The library hosts a September 11 memorial hosted by the CSUCI College Republicans, which includes a flag ceremony. The Career & Internship fair takes place at the library and is hosted by Career Development Services. The Involvement fair is hosted at the library, along with the Youth Authors' Fair.

The 24-hour final exam schedule event is hosted by the library every semester, usually during the last two weeks. In this event the library is open for 24 hours and students are provided with coffee and snacks.

Broome Library offers an array of services for its students, teachers, and guests. It has an estimated 125 desktop computers with internet access, 200 laptops, and digital and video cameras available for use and checkout. Food and drinks are available at the Freudian Sip Cafe, located just outside the library's main entrance.

The library houses the school's Disability Resource Programs, CSUCI Writing Center, University Learning Resource Center, Faculty Development, Information Technology and the Lagomarsino Archives. The library also has 11 classrooms, three conference rooms, nine group study sections, and one art gallery.

== Awards and recognition ==
The John Spoor Broome Library was named a winner in the California Construction magazine Best of 2008 awards program. The library won the Award of Merit in the Outstanding Architectural Design category. An independent jury of industry experts in design and construction judged more than 140 nominated projects in a variety of categories.
