= Roger Keeran =

American communist historian and professor (born 1944)

- Born: Roger Roy Keeran; 1944 (age 81–82); Lapeer, Michigan, U.S.
- Education: Wayne State University (BA); University of Wisconsin–Madison (MA, PhD)
- Occupations: Historian; professor
- Political party: Communist Party USA

Roger Roy Keeran, known as Roger Keeran or Roger R. Keeran (born in 1944, in Lapeer, Michigan), is an American historian and university professor who taught successively at Cornell, Princeton, Rutgers and the New York State University (SUNY). A specialist of Labor and Policy studies, he published, in 1980, The Communist Party and the Auto Workers' Unions and, in 2004, with co-author Thomas Kenny, Socialism Betrayed: Behind the Collapse of the Soviet Union (a book translated into several languages), as well as various articles in history or sociology journals. He is now Professor Emeritus of the Empire State College at SUNY after retiring in 2013.

== Biography ==
=== Education ===
In the 1960s, Keeran obtained a B.A. at Wayne State University in Detroit, Michigan. To pay for his studies, he worked in a General Motors automobile plant. He was also co-president of the Detroit Committee to End the War in Vietnam. He next obtained an M.A. and a Ph.D. in history at the University of Wisconsin–Madison. His published thesis was titled Communists and Auto Workers: The Struggle for a Union, 1919–1941 (University of Wisconsin-Madison, 1974).

=== Academic career ===
In September 1973, he began his first teaching job at the ILR School (School of Industrial and Labor Relations) at Cornell University in Ithaca, New York. Taking a keen interest in the work of Communist Party activists in the US automobile industry from the mid-1920s to the late 1940s (when the Party's forces were decimated), he published The Communist Party and the Auto Workers' Unions, which has since become a classic on the subject. However, the book’s academic approach to the purge of Communists from the United Auto Workers conflicted with US Cold War policies in effect at the time, and he lost his job at Cornell. He went on to teach at Princeton and Rutgers in New Jersey, as well as the Empire State School of the State University of New York (SUNY), where he mentored students in the Labor and Policy studies master's degree program, before retiring in 2013 as Professor Emeritus.

In 2004, with labor economist Thomas Kenny, he co-authored Socialism Betrayed: Behind the Collapse of the Soviet Union, a book which in the ensuing years was to be translated into French, Portuguese, Spanish, Russian, Bulgarian, Turkish, Persian and Chinese. In the words of journalist Peter Symon in The Guardian, "Socialism Betrayed traces the many circumstances and deviations that undoubtedly contributed to the final overthrow of socialism and the dismemberment of the Soviet Union into many supposedly independent republics." The first English edition was soon to be out of print mainly owing to the favorable publicity it garnered from reviews in left-wing newspapers and journals such as People's Weekly World (U.S.), The Morning Star (Great-Britain), Socialist Voice (Ireland), People's Voice (Canada), The Spark (Canada), The Guardian (Great-Britain), Australian Marxist Review (Australia), Marxistische Blaetter (Germany).

=== Political commitment ===
Keeran has been a member of the Communist Party USA for three decades, and is currently a member of the advisory board of the Marxist journal Science & Society.

== His published work ==
Besides his two major books, Keeran has published a number of articles in history or sociology journals such as Michigan History, Labor History, Science & Society, Industrial Relations, Policy Studies Journal, Nature, Society, and Thought, and was a contributor to The Encyclopedia of the American Left.

=== Books ===
- Milwaukee Reformers in the Progressive Era: The City Club of Milwaukee, 1908–1922, University of Wisconsin-Madison, 1969, 290 p. (2 editions published in 1969)
- Communists and Auto Workers: the Struggle for a Union, 1919–1941, University of Wisconsin-Madison, 1974, 766 p. (6 editions published between 1974 and 1984)
- The Communist Party and the Auto Workers' Unions, Indiana University Press, Bloomington, 1980, 352 p., ISBN 0-253-15754-4 (3 editions published between 2004 and 2010)
- With Elaine Harger and Paul C. Mishler, Bibliography of the Works of Philip Sheldon Foner, Empire State College / SUNY, 1994, 38 p. (2 editions published in 1995 in English)
- With Thomas Keeny, Socialism Betrayed: Behind the Collapse of the Soviet Union, International Publishers Co Inc., U.S. 2004, 230 p., ISBN 0-7178-0738-X (3 editions published between 2004 and 2010 in English) – French translation: Le socialisme trahi et les causes de la chute de l'URSS, Delga, 333 p., 2012 ISBN 978-2-915854-44-2 (translated by Hervé Fuyet and Janine Lazorthes) (1 edition published in 2012) – Portuguese translation: Socialismo Traído – Por trás do Colapso da União Soviética, tradução Vítor Guerreiro, Edições Avante, 2008, ISBN 978-972-550-336-2

=== Articles ===
- With James P. O'Brien, Ann Gordon, Paul Buhle, Jerry Markowitz, "New Left Historians of the 1960s," in Radical America, Vol. 4, No 8-9, Nov. 1970, p. 81–106
- "Communists and UAW Factionalism, 1937–1939," in Michigan History, Vol. 60, Summer 1976, p. 115–135
- "Communist Influence in the Automobile Industry, 1920–1933: Paving the Way for an Industrial Union," in Labor History, Vol. 20, Issue 2, Spring 1979, p. 189–225
- " "Everything for Victory": Communist Influence in the Auto Industry During World War II," in Science & Society, Vol. 43, No. 1, Spring, 1979, p. 1-28
- "Reply to Professor Lichtenstein", in Industrial Relations: A Journal of Economy and Society, Vol. 19, Issue 2, March 1980, p. 136-139
- "The International Workers Order and the Origins of the CIO," in Labor History, Vol. 30, Issue 3, 1989, p. 385–408
- With Greg Tarpinian, "Public Policy and the Recent Decline of Strikes," in Policy Studies Journal, Vol. 18, No 2, Winter, 1989–90, p. 461–470
- "International Workers Order," in Mari Jo Buhle, Paul Buhle, and Dan Georgakas eds., The Encyclopedia of the American Left, New York, Garland, 1990, p. 379–380
- "The Communist Influence on American Labor," in Michael E. Brown, et al., eds, New Studies in the Politics and Culture of U.S. Communism, Monthly Review Press, New York, 1993, p. 164–166
- "National Groups and the Popular Front: The Case of the International Workers Order", in Journal of American Ethnic History, Vol. 14, No 2, Spring, 1995, p. 23–51
- "The Italian Section of the International Workers Order, 1930–1950," in Italian American Review 7 (Spring/Summer 1999), p. 63–82
- With Thomas Kenny, "A Rejoinder to Erwin Marquit's Critique of Socialism Betrayed", in Nature, Society, and Thought, Vol. 17, No 3, 2004, p. 343–354, followed by Erwin Marquit, "Response to Keeran and Kenny's Rejoinder," p. 355–362
- With Thomas Kenny, "Debating the Soviet Demise: A Rejoinder," in Science and Society: A journal of Marxist thought and analysis, vol. 71, n°1, 2007, p. 103–110

== See also ==
=== Reviews ===
- Review by Bert Cochran of The Communist Party and the Auto Workers Unions, in The American Historical Review, Vol. 86, No 2, April 1981
- Review by Kenneth Waltzer of The Communist Party and the Auto Workers Unions, in The Journal of American History, 1981, p. 722
- Review by D. R. O'Connor Lysaght of Socialism Betrayed, on the website Socialist Democracy
- Review by Maria McGavigan of Socialism Betrayed, in Etudes marxistes, No 83, 2009, posted on the website INEM
- Review by Thomas Riggins of Socialism Betrayed, on the website Political Affairs, August 17, 2004
- Under the title "The Need for a Balanced Reappraisal of the USSR — A Review Essay", an in-depth review by Erwin Marquit of Socialism Betrayed, in Nature, Society, and Thought, vol. 16, No 4 (2003), p. 473–506
