= Marcus Rediker =

American historian (born 1951)

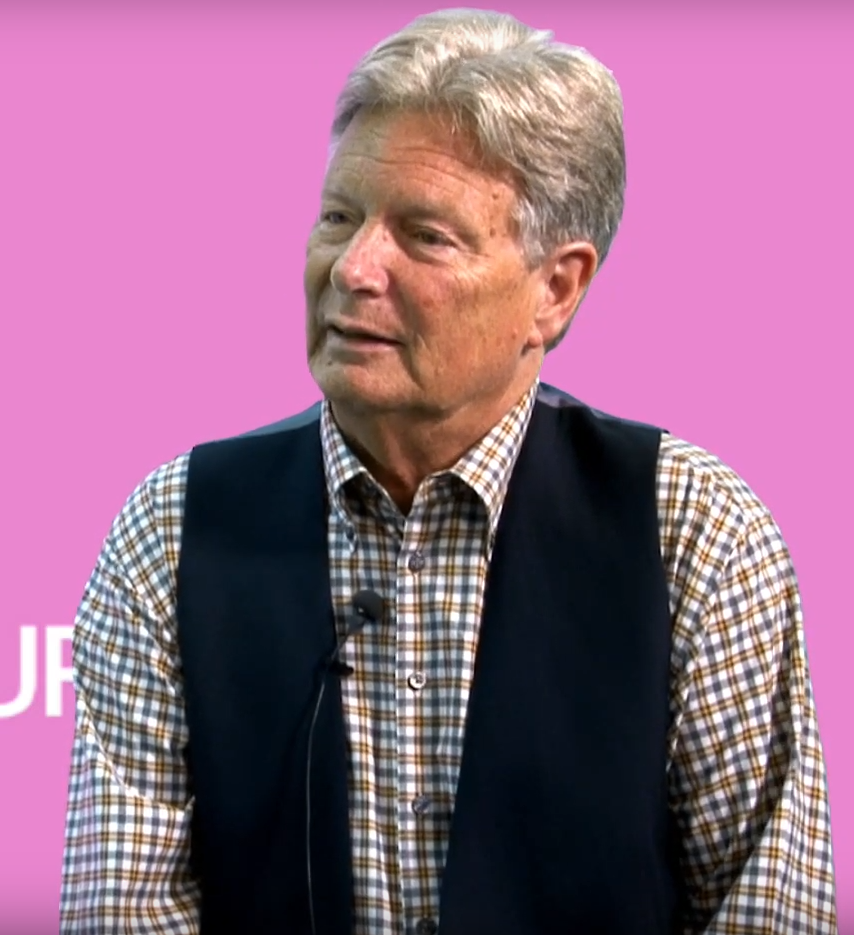
- Rediker during a 2019 interview
- Born: Marcus Buford Rediker; October 14, 1951 (age 75); Owensboro, Kentucky, US
- Spouse: Wendy Z. Goldman
- Children: 2
- Awards: Merle Curti Award (1988, 2008); George Washington Book Prize (2008)

Academic background
- Education: University of Pennsylvania (Ph.D.)
- Thesis: Society and Culture Among Anglo-American Deep Sea Sailors, 1700-1750 (1982)
- Academic advisors: Richard Slator Dunn; Mike Zuckerman

Academic work
- Era: Early modern period
- Discipline: Social history
- Sub-discipline: History of slavery
- Institutions: Georgetown University; University of Pittsburgh
- Marcus Rediker's voice Marcus Rediker on the etymology and philosophical origins of "history from below" Recorded February 9, 2018
- Website: marcusrediker.com

Marcus Buford Rediker (born October 14, 1951) is an American historian, writer, professor, and social activist. He graduated with a Bachelor of Arts from Virginia Commonwealth University in 1976 and attended the University of Pennsylvania for graduate study, earning a Master of Arts and Ph.D. in history. He taught at Georgetown University from 1982 to 1994 and is currently a distinguished professor of Atlantic history of the Department of History at the University of Pittsburgh.

Rediker is best known for his books on piracy and the Middle Passage that follow a people's history narrative. On occasion, Rediker has collaborated with contemporaries such as Peter Linebaugh and Paul Buhle. Rediker has also worked on the production of a one-man show based on Quaker abolitionist Benjamin Lay with playwright Naomi Wallace as well as a documentary on La Amistad with filmmaker Tony Buba.

Politically, Rediker has described himself as far-left, but he does not align with any political party. Rediker is a staunch opponent of capital punishment and supports reparations for slavery. He is a two-time winner of the Merle Curti Award and won the George Washington Book Prize in 2008. Rediker received fellowships from the National Endowment for the Humanities, American Council of Learned Societies, and the John Simon Guggenheim Memorial Foundation, and was recognized by the Organization of American Historians as a distinguished lecturer from 2002 to 2008.

== Early life ==
Rediker was born in Owensboro, Kentucky, on October 14, 1951, to Buford and Faye Rediker. He is the first of two children, preceding his brother Shayne. Rediker's family came from a working class background, and they later moved to Nashville, Tennessee and Richmond, Virginia. Rediker has credited his grandfather, a coal miner, as one of his earliest influences. In a 2018 interview, Rediker said that "It took me many years but I finally realized that the kinds of stories I like to tell, and the books I have written, have his Appalachian storytelling tradition behind them."

A first-generation college student, Rediker began attending Vanderbilt University in 1969 before dropping out in 1971. Commenting on his time at Vanderbilt, Rediker recalled that he felt out of place due to the university's connections with the Southern elite. Initially attending on a basketball scholarship, Rediker credited campus protests against the Vietnam War, the civil rights movement, and the black power movement with influencing both his interest in history and his political beliefs. In Richmond, Rediker worked in a DuPont textile factory for three years making cellophane. The factory faced extreme racial tension, with Rediker describing supporters of Malcolm X and a Grand Wizard of the Ku Klux Klan working alongside him. Rediker's experiences with his co-workers fueled his passion for social history.

== Education ==
Rediker's job motivated him to read books and attend two night school courses on the American and French Revolution. After being laid off from the factory, Rediker enrolled at Virginia Commonwealth University. In 1976, Rediker graduated with a Bachelor of Arts in history. Rediker later attended the University of Pennsylvania for his graduate studies, working under Richard Slator Dunn. Originally intending to study Caribbean history, Rediker developed a deep fascination in Atlantic history while writing a research paper on sailors and pirates. Rediker published his dissertation, Society and Culture Among Anglo-American Deep Sea Sailors, 1700-1750, in 1982. At the University of Pennsylvania, Rediker earned a Master of Arts and Ph.D. in history.

== Career ==
Rediker began teaching at Georgetown University in 1982 before leaving to work at the University of Pittsburgh in 1994, where he has primarily taught ever since. Rediker was the Dan and Maggie Inouye Distinguished Chair of Democratic Ideals at the University of Hawaiʻi at Mānoa during the 2019-2020 semester.

Throughout his career, Rediker has written several books on Atlantic social, labor, and maritime history. For certain books, he collaborated with contemporaries such as Peter Linebaugh and Paul Buhle. In 2023, Rediker and Buhle co-wrote two graphic novels illustrated by David Lester. Rediker has written opinion pieces for the Pittsburgh Post-Gazette, Boston Globe, Los Angeles Times, The Nation, and The New York Times.

=== Tate Britain ===
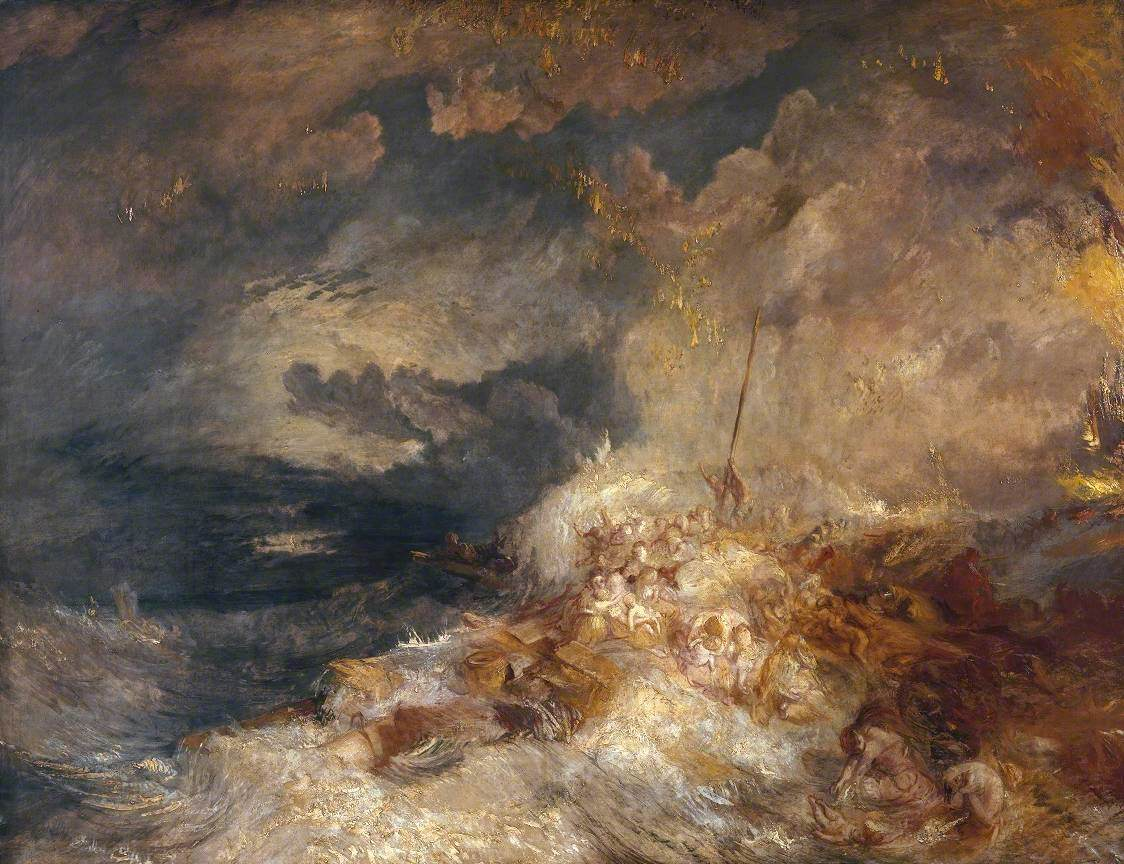
Rediker's resignation from Tate Britain centered around J.M.W. Turner's unfinished 1835 painting A Disaster at Sea.

After serving five years as guest curator of the Tate Britain art museum in the J.M.W. Turner Gallery, Rediker resigned in June 2023 after his request to display a punishment box in front of Turner's 1835 painting, A Disaster at Sea, was denied by the museum. The painting, which was never finished, is theorized to have been based on the 1833 loss of Amphitrite, a British merchant and convict ship. On her final voyage, Amphitrite carried 108 female convicts and 12 children, all of whom perished. According to Rediker, the box was meant as a tribute to the ship's victims. Rediker alleged that the museum censored his proposal, though the museum claimed it was denied due to uncertainty surrounding the depicted ship's identity and the box's "domineering presence".

=== Other work ===
In May 2013, Rediker and filmmaker Tony Buba traveled to the home villages of slaves that revolted on the Spanish vessel La Amistad in July 1839. During their trip to southern Sierra Leone, Rediker and Buba conducted interviews with village elders and searched for the ruins of the Lomboko slave factory. A documentary chronicling the journey, Ghosts of Amistad: In the Footsteps of Rebels premiered in November 2014 at the Three Rivers Film Festival in Pittsburgh. The film has been screened at multiple film festivals and universities across the world and aired on PBS since its release.

Rediker wrote a book and a play on Quaker abolitionist Benjamin Lay (pictured). Rediker called Lay “the most fascinating historical person that most people have never heard of,”.

In 2017, Rediker and playwright Naomi Wallace started production on a play based on Benjamin Lay, a Quaker abolitionist. The play originated from an idea Rediker and Wallace had for a joint lecture in Berlin, where an actor dressed up as Lay would interrupt the presentation and monologue. After conference organizers rejected their proposal, Rediker and Wallace withdrew in protest and began writing the play. The Return of Benjamin Lay debuted at the Finborough Theatre in June 2023. A one-man show, the performance features Lay — played by Mark Povinelli — plead for his return to the Quaker community. The play received positive reviews from critics such as Michael Billington, who praised Povinelli's performance. The show played until July 8, 2023. In April 2023, Rediker announced he would again collaborate with Tony Buba on a film chronicling the making of the play. Rediker is on the board of the Pittsburgh theater company Quantum Theatre.

== Scholarship ==
Informed by Marxian economics, Rediker's works explore their respective subjects in systemic terms while emphasizing human class-consciousness and agency. Historical narratives that emphasize the plights of the poor and oppressed are known as a people's history or "history from below".

Rediker has contended that few historians have used this narrative outside of American history, and that the struggle of the oppressed has had a largely unspoken yet considerable impact on world history. Though Rediker has admitted that finding primary sources from his subjects can be difficult, he says that the "history from below" approach better humanizes his subjects and offers a more detailed point of view than other historical narratives. Rediker regards this approach as “the most democratic and inclusive kind of history".

=== Pirates and sailors ===
Rediker wrote that pirates are pivotal to labor history.

Rediker has written numerous works on pirates and sailors as pre-industrial laborers and how piracy was a direct result of collectivism and solidarity between sailors. Viewing the pirates as a "motley crew", Rediker highlights the multiculturalism and alliances between pirate crews. This approach puts perspective on the egalitarianism of some pirate crews. In Villains of All Nations, Rediker wrote that by mutinying or capturing a ship, pirates were seizing the means of maritime production from merchant capitalists and declaring their ships to be under common ownership.

According to Rediker, pirates were not just targeted by the authorities because of their illegal activities, but also for liberating and radicalizing laborers. Rediker argues that this form of imperial oppression is still present in the modern day, with Rediker using the United States' actions against revolutions in Vietnam, Cuba, and Nicaragua as examples of such persecution.

=== Slaves ===
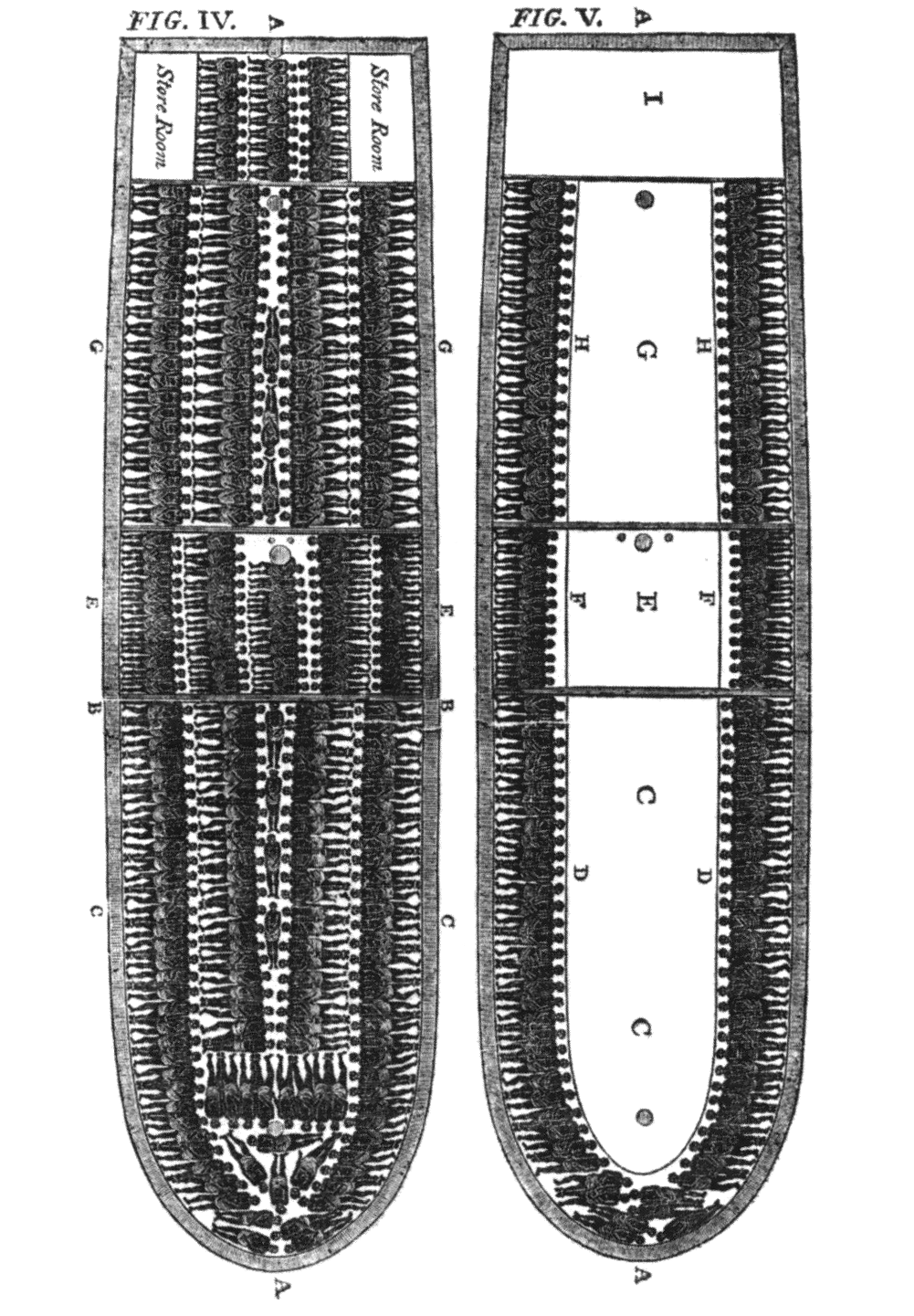
A diagram of a typical slave ship during the Atlantic slave trade. Rediker often stresses the cramped and dirty conditions of the ships.

As a practitioner of people's history, Rediker underlines the ruthlessness of sea captains and the squalor of slave ships in his works on slavery. In the introduction to The Slave Ship: A Human History, Rediker presents four dramas: the relations between slave ship captains and their crew, the relations between slave ship captains and their slaves, conflict among the enslaved, and the abolitionist image of the slave ships. In that same introduction, Rediker summarizes that the link between slave ships and social relations shaped the modern world despite their obscure histories.

In describing what he wanted to accomplish in his book, The Amistad Rebellion: An Atlantic Odyssey of Slavery and Freedom, Rediker commented that he wanted to call attention to how the slave trade contributed to the rise of capitalism. Rediker mentioned that the role slave ships had in forming the concept of race was critical to the book, going on to say that the concept of race was created aboard the slave ships when multi-ethnic Africans were labelled as negroes and subjected to violence and terror.

==== La Amistad ====
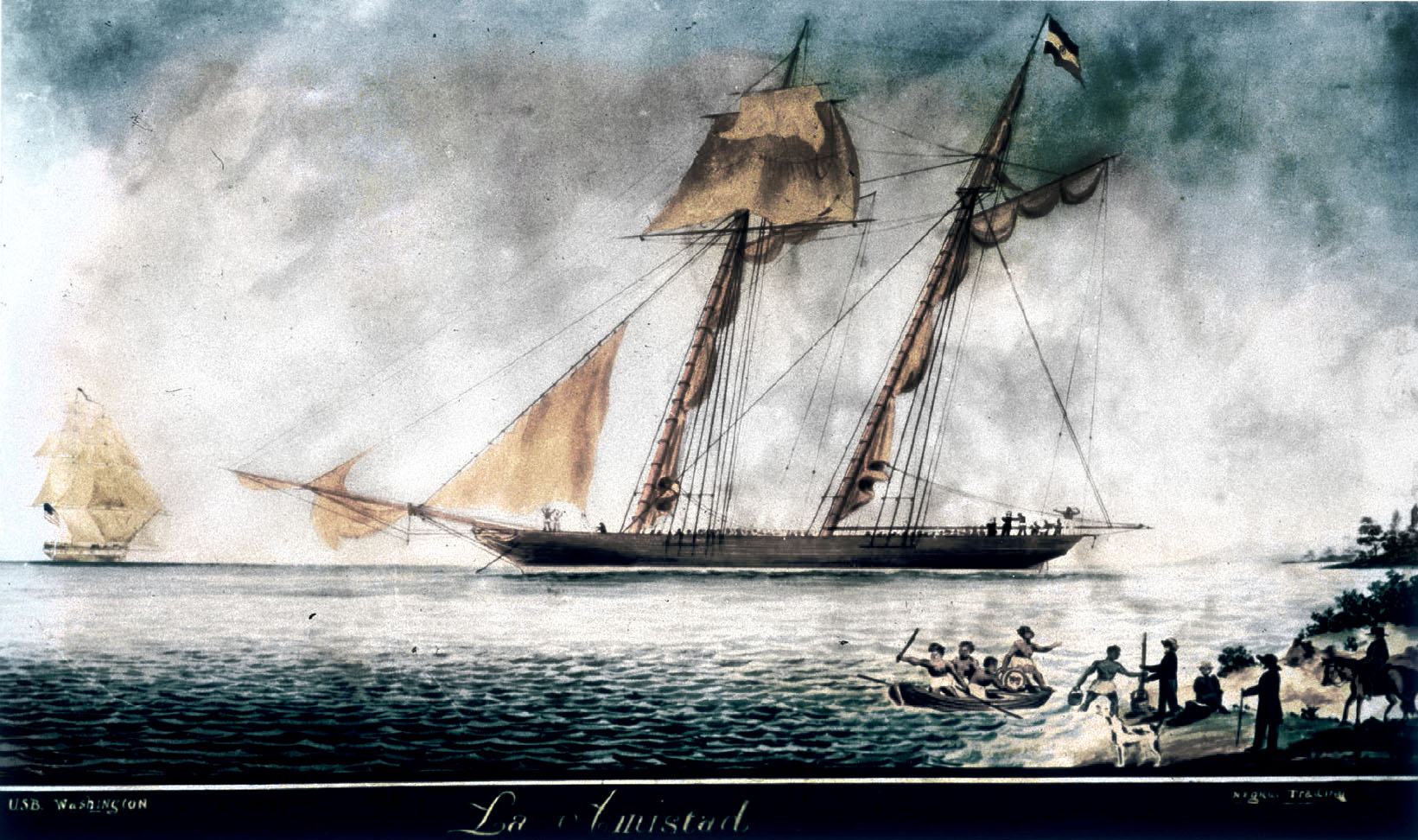
A contemporary painting of the slave ship La Amistad. Rediker aimed to explain the planning behind its July 1839 slave revolt.

When researching La Amistad, Rediker sought to explore the cultural backgrounds of those aboard and the Poro society of Sierra Leone to provide perspective behind the planning of the slave revolt. According to Rediker in the introduction to The Amistad Rebellion: An Atlantic Odyssey of Slavery and Freedom, United States v. The Amistad and the subsequent courtroom drama had overshadowed the history of the initial rebellion on the ship. Many of the sources in Rediker's book on La Amistad come from journalists and visitors who interviewed the defendants during their 27 months in Connecticut. Rediker ends the introduction by expressing how the events surrounding La Amistad can be seen through the lens of a people's history, arguing that it puts the rebels "back at the center of their own story and the larger history they helped to make."

=== Many-Headed Hydra ===
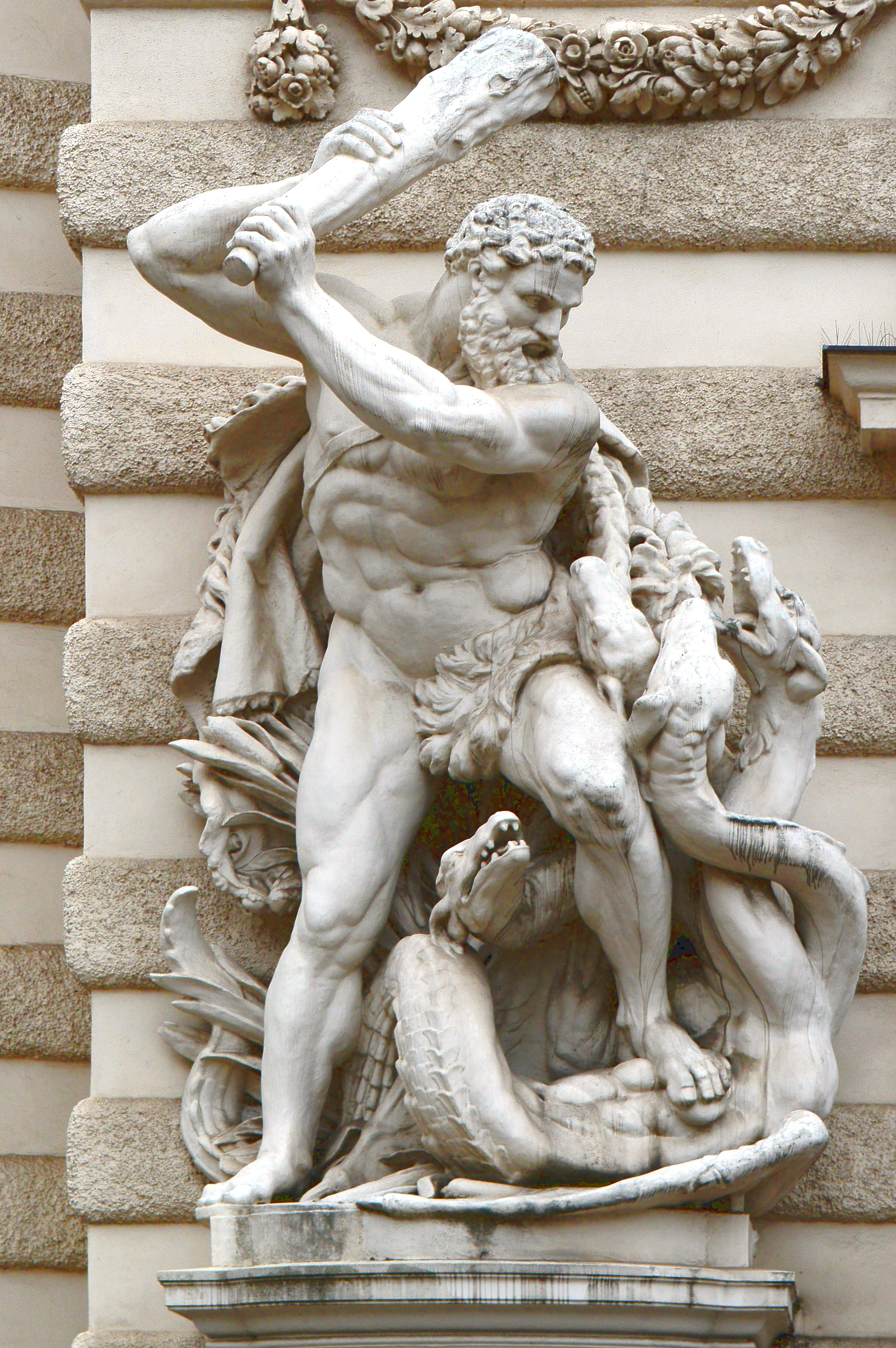
A statue of Hercules fighting the Lernaean Hydra. Rediker has used this imagery as symbolism for class struggle.

The Lernaean Hydra, a serpentine water monster in Greek mythology and Roman mythology, is used as a metaphor for commoners and persecuted groups throughout many of Rediker's works. Hercules, the slayer of the many-headed beast, represents the Atlantic capitalists. This metaphor is most prominent in The Many-Headed Hydra: Sailors, Slaves, Commoners, and the Hidden History of the Revolutionary Atlantic co-written with Peter Linebaugh.

Rediker and Linebaugh argue that the classically educated rulers and businessmen of the era compared themselves to Hercules, with his twelve labors being likened to the efforts of organizing and structuring the transatlantic economy. Hercules' battle against the Hydra is thus symbolic of "the difficulty of imposing order on increasingly global systems of labor." Rediker and Linebaugh label oppressed groups such as felons, indentured servants, African slaves, pirates, and religious radicals as some of the many heads of the Hydra. Though this symbolism indicates cooperation between these various groups, Rediker has also made clear that it can depict the chaos of a disorganized and conflicted Atlantic proletariat.

=== Terracentrism ===
Rediker coined the term "terracentrism" to describe the tendency of historians to solely concentrate on history that occurs on dry land. Rediker has maintained that this view obfuscates how history can be made on slave and migrant ships, and that migrants and seafarers incited social, cultural, and political progress.

== Political views and activism ==
During a 2017 interview with French daily newspaper Libération, Rediker defined himself as far-left. He stated that while he was well-read on communism and anarchism, he did not identify with any political party in particular.

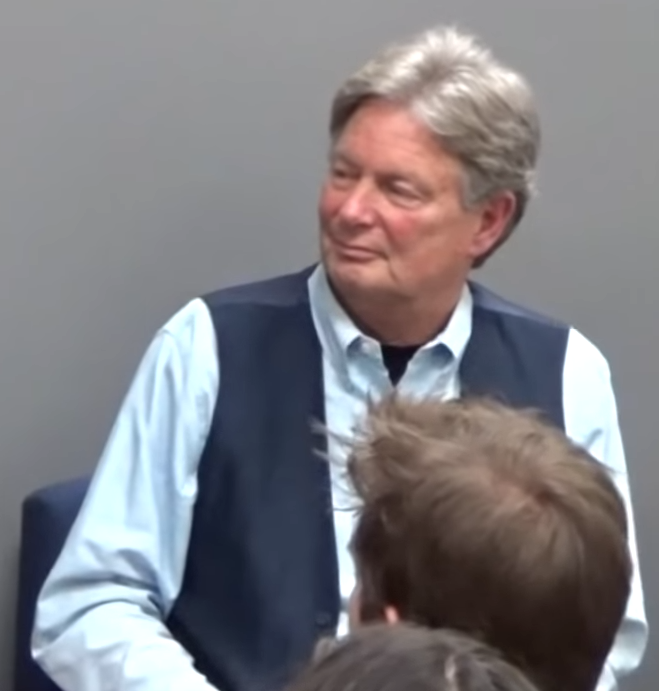
Rediker in 2018.

Rediker is a human rights activist, and has criticized governments that issue the death penalty. In a 2013 interview with French magazine La Vie des Idées, Rediker said he was inspired to write a book on La Amistad after a 1998 meeting with Mumia Abu-Jamal at SCI-Green's death row. Abu-Jamal, convicted and sentenced to death for the murder of Philadelphia police officer Daniel Faulkner, had been incarcerated since 1982. Rediker recounted that "he described to me the moment when he first got an active death warrant, meaning, he was given a slip of paper with his date to die on it. That was a moment of connection between race and terror." Rediker saw that he could explore this relationship between race and terror on slave ships. Abu-Jamal's death conviction was overruled in federal court in 2001, and he was sentenced to life imprisonment without parole in 2011.

Rediker supports reparations for slavery, and has praised authors such as Ana Lucia Araujo who have chronicled the history of the reparations movement. In an interview published in Israeli newspaper Haaretz, Rediker described slavery as an "African holocaust" and likened slave ships to concentration camps. During that interview, Rediker described the impact of slavery in the United States and its ramifications:

I feel as though the presence of slavery in everything that we do now makes it very hard to talk about. In other words, if it was safely in the past, it would be easy to have a discussion about slavery, but the fact is that we still live with its consequences: Deep structural inequality, poverty, discrimination, premature death for large numbers of people who live in our cities, highly radicalized mass incarceration. If you think of slavery as an injustice that produced lasting consequences across many generations, then you have a responsibility to commit to doing something about it.

== Personal life ==
Rediker is married to Wendy Z. Goldman, a professor of Soviet history at Carnegie Mellon University. He has two children.

From 1984 to 1985, Rediker resided in Moscow. Rediker is a connoisseur of Haitian art and owns a private collection. Brandin Knight, the associate head coach for the Rutgers Scarlet Knights and a University of Pittsburgh alumnus, has cited Rediker as an influence in obtaining his degree in history.

== Awards ==
Rediker has earned a number of awards for his works. He was given the Organization of American Historians' Merle Curti Award in 1988 and 2008. In 2008, Rediker was awarded the George Washington Book Prize, one of the largest book awards in the United States. In 1988, Rediker received the John Hope Franklin Publication Prize from the American Studies Association. In 2001, Rediker was presented with the International Labor History Book Prize from the Kalmanovitz Initiative for Labor and the Working Poor at Georgetown University. In 2015, Ghosts of Amistad: In the Footsteps of Rebels won the John E. O'Connor Film Prize for Best Historical Documentary.

Rediker has received fellowships from the National Endowment for the Humanities, American Council of Learned Societies, and the John Simon Guggenheim Memorial Foundation. The Organization of American Historians designated Rediker as a distinguished lecturer from 2002 to 2008.

== Works ==
=== Books ===
Title	Collaborated with	Year	Awards
Between the Devil and the Deep Blue Sea: Merchant Seamen, Pirates, and the Anglo-American Maritime World, 1700–1750		1987	Merle Curti Award - 1988 John Hope Franklin Publication Prize - 1988
Who Built America? Working People and the Nation’s Economy, Politics, Culture, and Society, Volume 1		1989	
The Many-Headed Hydra: Sailors, Slaves, Commoners, and the Hidden History of the Revolutionary Atlantic	Peter Linebaugh	2000	International Labor History Book Prize - 2001
Villains of All Nations: Atlantic Pirates in the Golden Age		2004	
Many Middle Passages: Forced Migration and the Making of the Modern World	Emma Christopher Cassandra Pybus	2007	
Mutiny and Maritime Radicalism in the Age of Revolution: A Global Survey	Niklas Frykman Clare Anderson Lex Heerma van Voss	2007	
The Slave Ship: A Human History		2007	Merle Curti Award - 2008 George Washington Book Prize - 2008
The Amistad Rebellion: An Atlantic Odyssey of Slavery and Freedom		2012	
Outlaws of the Atlantic: Sailors, Pirates, and Motley Crews in the Age of Sail		2014	
The Fearless Benjamin Lay: The Quaker Dwarf Who Became the First Revolutionary Abolitionist		2017	
A Global History of Runaways: Workers, Mobility, and Capitalism: 1600-1850	Titas Chakraborty Matthias van Rossum	2019	
Prophet Against Slavery	Paul Buhle David Lester	2021	
Under the Banner of King Death: Pirates of the Atlantic, a Graphic Novel	Paul Buhle David Lester	2023	
Freedom Ship: The Uncharted History of Escaping Slavery by Sea		2025	
The Black Schooner: Rebellion on the Amistad, A Graphic Novel	David Lester and Paul Buhle	2026	

=== Film ===
Year	Title	Director	Writer	Producer	Awards	Source
2014	Ghosts of Amistad: In the Footsteps of Rebels	No	Yes	Yes	John E. O'Connor Film Prize Best Historical Documentary - 2015	
TBA	Becoming Benjamin Lay					

=== Theatre ===
Year	Title	Director	Writer	Producer	Actor	Notes	Source
2023	Return of Benjamin Lay	No	Yes	No	No	co-written with Naomi Wallace	

== See also ==
- Hydrarchy
