= Affinity group =

Social grouping formed around a shared interest or goal

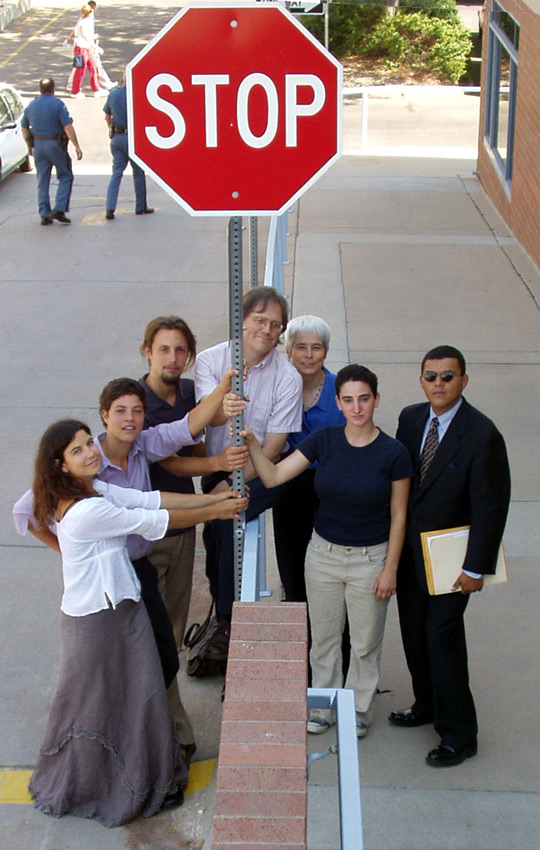
An affinity group of anti-war protesters

An affinity group is a group formed around a shared affinity, interest or common goal, to which individuals formally or informally belong. Affinity groups are generally precluded from being under the aegis of any governmental agency, and their purposes must be primarily non-commercial. Examples of affinity groups include private social clubs, fraternities, writing or reading circles, hobby clubs, and groups engaged in political activism.

Some affinity groups are organized in a non-hierarchical manner, often using consensus decision making, and are frequently made up of trusted friends. They provide a method of organization that is flexible and decentralized. Other affinity groups may have a hierarchy to provide management of the group's long-term interests, or if the group is large enough to require the delegation of responsibilities to other members or staff.

Affinity groups can be based on a common social identity or ideology (e.g., anarchism, conservatism), a shared concern for a given issue (e.g., anti-nuclear, anti-abortion), a common activity, role, interest or skill (e.g., legal support, medical aid, software engineering), or shared personal identity (e.g. race/ethnicity, gender, disability, cultural interests). Affinity groups may have either open or closed membership, although the latter is far more common. Some charge membership dues or expect members to share the cost of the group's expenses.

== Employee and professional affinity groups ==
Affinity groups in the workplace or as part of a professional association are composed of people who share similar backgrounds or interests. In the workplace, they are also referred to as Employee Resource Groups (ERGs) that form a part of the organization diversity, equity, and inclusion efforts. Employee affinity groups are historically race- and gender-based but now also include groups that recognize affinity in age, veteran status or sexual identity. As part of a professional association, affinity group members engage in networking, mentoring, and opportunities for both professional and personal development.

== Political affinity groups ==
Affinity groups engaged in political activism date to 19th century Spain. It was a favourite way of organization by Spanish anarchists (grupos de afinidad), and had their base in the tertulias or in the local groups.

Politically oriented affinity groups in the United States gained public attention during the anti-Vietnam War movement of the 1960s and 1970s. The term was first used by Ben Morea and the group Black Mask. Later, anti-war activists on college campuses organized around their hobbies or backgrounds -- religious, gender, ethnic group, etc. They became popular in the 1970s in the anti-nuclear movement in the United States and Europe. The 30,000 person occupation and blockade of the Ruhr nuclear power station in Germany in 1969 was organized on the affinity group model. Today, the structure is used by many different activists: animal rights, black bloc, environmental, anti-war, and anti-globalization, to name some examples.

The 1999 protests in Seattle which shut down the WTO Ministerial Conference of 1999 included coordinated organization by many clusters of affinity groups.

== Organization ==
=== External ===
By definition, affinity groups are autonomous from any larger body. Co-ordinated effort and co-operation amongst several affinity groups, however, is often achieved by using a loose form of confederation. Private clubs, for example, may cooperate through reciprocal agreements which allow the members of one club to use the facilities of another club in a different location. Other affinity groups, such as Rotarians or Toastmasters, may be individual units that conform to shared standards so that one may participate in another group of the same name anywhere on earth without requiring the individual to reapply for a new membership.

- Cluster: The cluster is the basic unit of organization amongst affinity groups. A cluster consists of several affinity groups and is organized in a non-hierarchical manner. A cluster can be permanent, but is more often an ad hoc grouping organized for one specific task or action. One can be organized around a shared goal (e.g. blockading a particular road), a common ideology (e.g. the Quakers) or a place of origin.
- Spokescouncil: The spokescouncil is an aggregate of clusters and affinity groups. Each affinity group or cluster nominates one representative (often called a "spoke") to participate in the council. Spokescouncils are most often temporary bodies, committed to accomplishing one task or event.

=== Internal ===
Affinity groups tend to be loosely organized, however there are some formal roles or positions that commonly occur. A given affinity group may have all, some or none of these positions. They may be permanent or temporary and the group may opt to take turns in these roles, or assign one role to one person.

- Spokesperson (or just spoke): The individual charged with representing the affinity group at a spokescouncil or cluster meeting. Occasionally, the spoke will be granted a more general ambassadorial role by the affinity group.
- Facilitator: A person or people who perform facilitation duties in consensus process of the group and also, to varying degrees, act as arbiter of internal conflicts.
- Media contact: An individual who represents the group to the mass media. Often this individual is the same person as the Spoke.
- Vibe watch: A person or people charged with monitoring the mood and feeling of the group. The reference is to vibrations in the colloquial emotional sense. In some affinity groups, the vibe watch is also charged with keeping the facilitator from using their role to favor any position or proposal.
- Snap-decision facilitator: Also called "quick decision facilitator", this is a person charged with making decisions for the group in time-constrained or high-pressure situations. The position is rare and is almost always temporary (contrast with the pre-Imperial Roman concept of a temporary dictator).

== See also ==
- Community of interest
- Racial segregation
- Religious segregation
- Ruckus Society
- Security culture
- Sex segregation
- Professional association
