= Prophet Against Slavery =

Graphic novel about Benjamin Lay

Prophet Against Slavery: Benjamin Lay
- Date: November 2, 2021
- Page count: 117 pages
- Publisher: Beacon Press

Creative team
- Artist: David Lester
- Editors: Marcus Rediker and Paul Buhle

Prophet Against Slavery: Benjamin Lay, a Graphic Novel is a graphic novel illustrated by David Lester and the editors of the book are Marcus Rediker and Paul Buhle. The 117-page graphic novel was published by Beacon Press on November 2, 2021. The graphic novel is about the Quaker abolitionist Benjamin Lay.

== Background ==
The graphic novel is about Benjamin Lay. The graphic novel was illustrated by David Lester and the editors of the book are Marcus Rediker and Paul Buhle. The graphic novel is based on a biography of Benjamin Lay written by Rediker in 2017. The graphic novel was published by Beacon Press on November 2, 2021. The book is 117 pages long. The novel depicts Benjamin Lay performing guerilla theatre to get the attention of a Quaker meeting and condemn the evils of slavery.

== Reception ==
The Publishers Weekly review noted that the "digital font clashes with the hand-drawn quality". Adel Franklyn wrote in Broken Pencil Magazine that the novel has "a passionate script, and a compelling narrative in one." Dan Brown wrote in The London Free Press that "the story leaps off the page" and compared the art to Ralph Steadman's work. Thom Dunn wrote in Boing Boing that the "graphic novel does a tremendous job" of depicting Benjamin Lay. Bill Meyer made a similar comment in Magnet Magazine noting the relationship between the stature of Lay and the power of his message. The graphic novel received positive coverage from socialist and anarchist publications such as the Democratic Socialists of America, the Socialist Worker, and Fifth Estate.

== See also ==
- The Fearless Benjamin Lay
