= The Amistad Rebellion =

Book written by Marcus Rediker

The Amistad Rebellion: An Atlantic Odyssey of Slavery and Freedom is a book by Marcus Rediker.

== Background ==
The book is about the 1839 Slave Revolt aboard the La Amistad. Rediker's previous book, The Slave Ship: A Human History, had a tone of hopelessness that contrasts with the story of The Amistad Rebellion. Rediker criticises the popular narrative that the American legal system was the hero of the story. The 1997 film directed by Steven Spielberg called Amistad focused on the courtroom drama, whereas Rediker's book focuses on the experiences of the African men.

== Adaptation ==
Rediker and filmmaker Tony Buba travelled to Sierra Leone to the villages of the rebels and documented their experiences in a film called Ghosts of Amistad: In the Footsteps of the Rebels. In the documentary Rediker interviews various people from the villages where the rebels lived. The intention of the interviews were to uncover the oral history passed down the generations. The documentary also included Rediker's search for the ruins of Lomboko. During their search they discover that there may have been an unrecorded uprising by Sengbe and his compatriots at Lomboko. The film debuted on November 15, 2014 during the Three Rivers Film Festival.

== Reception ==
Barbara Hoffert wrote in the Library Journal that Rediker "tell[s] the story anew, giving greater depth to the Africans' background". Publishers Weekly called the book "Spectacularly researched and fluidly composed". William Mingin wrote in Audiofile Magazine that the book gets bogged "down in repetition, tiresome or extraneous detail, and strained analysis". Writing in The Augusta Chronicle, Terri Schlichenmeyer praised the book for doing an "exceptional job in putting individual faces on each of the ships passengers".

The book won a Booklist Editors' Choice award for Adult Books in 2012.
