= The Fearless Benjamin Lay =

Biography of Benjamin Lay

- Author: Marcus Rediker
- Cover artist: William Williams
- Language: English
- Genre: Biography
- Publisher: Beacon Press
- Media type: Book
- ISBN: 978-080703592-4

The Fearless Benjamin Lay: The Quaker Dwarf Who Became the First Revolutionary Abolitionist is a biography of Benjamin Lay written by Marcus Rediker and published by Beacon Press on September 5, 2017. The book was followed by a companion graphic novel entitled Prophet Against Slavery in 2021.

== Background ==
The 216-page book was written by Marcus Rediker and published by Beacon Press on September 5, 2017. The book is a biography about Benjamin Lay, a Quaker dwarf with strong abolitionist convictions. The book is the first biography that Rediker has written and is composed of six chapters. Rediker is not a Quaker, however, his book follows in the tradition of Christopher Hill and his book The World Turned Upside Down. In the book, Rediker argues that Lay was responsible for establishing the antislavery position for the Quakers. A companion graphic novel illustrated by David Lester called Prophet Against Slavery was published in 2021.

Benjamin Lay was married to Quaker minister Sarah Smith Lay. They lived in Barbados for a couple of years before moving to Pennsylvania. Benjamin Franklin published a book by Lay in 1737 titled All Slave-Keepers That Keep the Innocent in Bondage, Apostates. Lay wrote the book while travelling around the world and observing how the slave trade was operated.

== Reception ==
The Publishers Weekly review states that the book "successfully rescues Lay from obscurity" and that Benjamin Lay "deserve[s] to be remembered." The Guardian included the book on their list of the best biographies and autobiographies of 2017 saying that the book is "micro-history at its best". Christianity Today commented on the book saying that it "brings vividly to life a near-forgotten figure".
