= Up Against the Wall Motherfucker =

American anarchist affinity group (1967–1969)

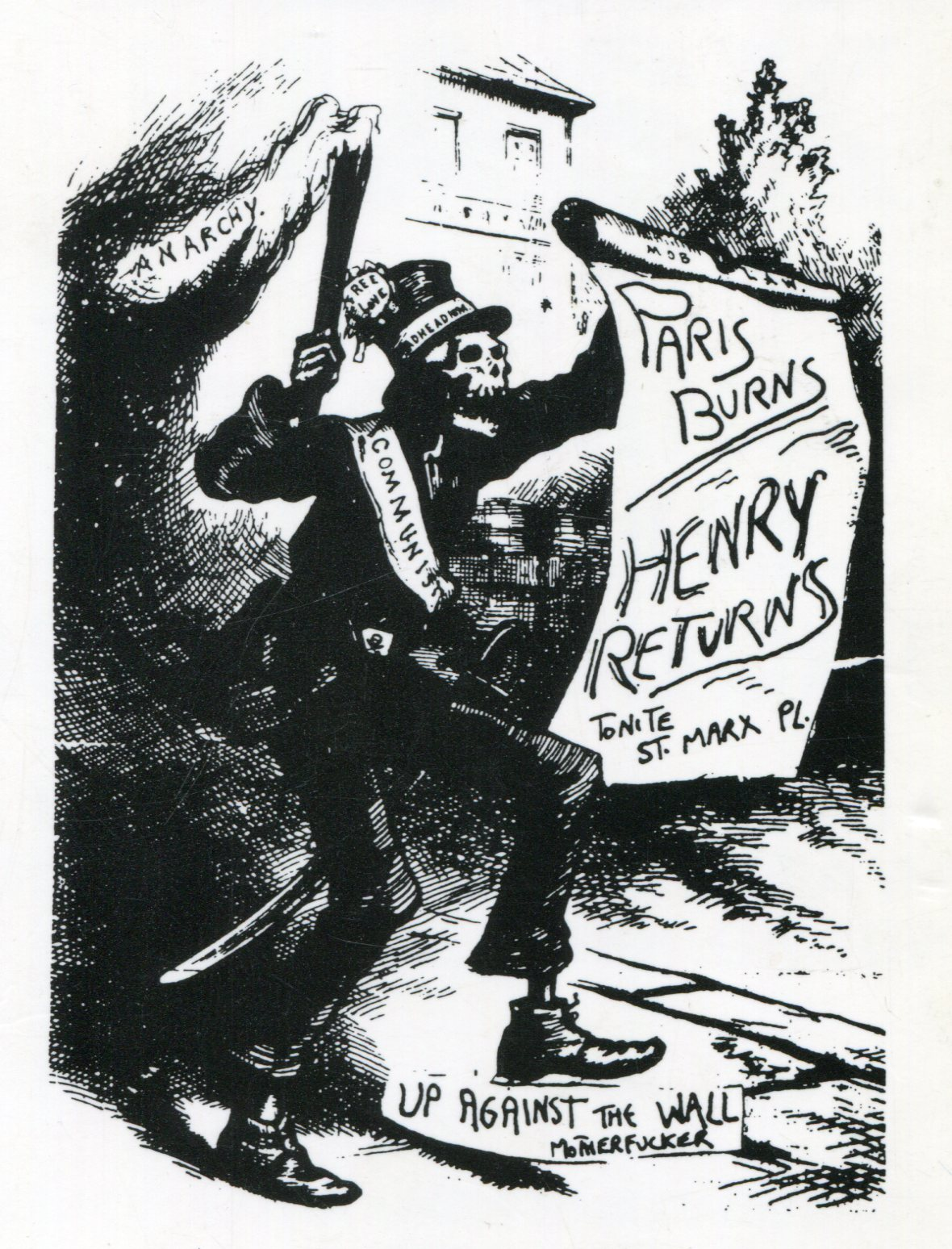
- 1967 poster by Black Mask proclaiming "Up against the wall motherfucker", which later became the name of the group
- Predecessor: Black Mask
- Formation: January 1967
- Founder: Ben Morea; Dan Georgakas
- Location: New York City, United States of America

Up Against the Wall Motherfucker, often shortened as The Motherfuckers or UAW/MF, was a Dadaist and Situationist anarchist affinity group based in New York City. This "street gang with analysis" was famous for its Lower East Side direct action.

== History ==
The Motherfuckers grew out of a Dada-influenced art group called Black Mask with some additional people involved with the anti-Vietnam War Angry Arts week, held in January 1967. Formed in 1966 by Ben Morea, a painter of Catalan origins, and the poet Dan Georgakas.

Black Mask produced a broadside of the same name, and declared that revolutionary art should be "an integral part of life, as in primitive society, and not an appendage to wealth". In May 1968, Black Mask changed its name and went underground. Their new name, Up Against the Wall Motherfuckers, came from a poem by Amiri Baraka. Abbie Hoffman characterized them as "the middle-class nightmare ... an anti-media phenomenon simply because their name could not be printed".

In 1967, The Motherfuckers forced their way into the Pentagon during an anti-war protest and flung blood, eggs and stones at U.S. Secretary of State Dean Rusk who was attending a Foreign Policy Association event in New York. In January 1968, they performed a mock "assassination" of poet Kenneth Koch (using blanks) and dumped uncollected refuse from the Lower East Side into the fountain at Lincoln Center on the opening night of a gala "bourgeois cultural event" during a NYC garbage strike (an event documented in the Newsreel film Garbage).

Also in 1968, the Motherfuckers organized and produced free concert nights in the Fillmore East after successfully demanding that owner Bill Graham give the community the venue for a series of weekly free concerts. These "Free Nights" were short-lived as the combined forces of NY City Hall, the police, and Bill Graham terminated the arrangement. The Motherfuckers also created a ruckus at the Boston Tea Party: after the MC5 opened for the Velvet Underground. One of the Motherfuckers got on stage and started haranguing the audience, directing them to "burn this place down and take to the streets". This got "The Five" banned from the venue. Also in 1968, the Motherfuckers rioted at an MC5 show at the Fillmore East. Some Motherfuckers "beat (Graham) with a chain and broke his nose". This got the Detroit band banned from all venues controlled by Bill Graham and his friends. In 1969, the Motherfuckers cut open the fences at the Woodstock Festival, allowing thousands to enter for free.

== Associations ==
Prior to becoming the Motherfuckers, the Situationist International accepted Morea's group as its New York chapter. Valerie Solanas, a radical feminist and would-be assassin of Andy Warhol, was friends with Morea and associated with the Motherfuckers. In the film I Shot Andy Warhol, the gun used in her attack is alleged to have been taken from Morea. When Morea was asked in a 2005 interview by John McMillian of The New York Press how he had been able to rationalize supporting Solanas, Morea replied, "Rationalize? I didn't rationalize anything. I loved Valerie and I loathed Andy Warhol, so that's all there was to it." He then added "I mean, I didn't want to shoot him." He then added: "Andy Warhol ruined art."

== Influence as a slogan ==
The phrase was taken from the poem, "Black People!" by Amiri Baraka (LeRoi Jones): "The magic words are: Up against the wall, mother fucker, this is a stick up!" This, in turn, was a reference to a phrase "supposedly barked by Newark cops to Negroes under custody." The poem had appeared in The New York Times in 1968 and Mark Rudd, an organizer for Columbia University's Students for a Democratic Society, provocatively quoted the line in an open letter to the university president.

Most of the lyrics for the 1969 song "We Can Be Together", by the acid rock band Jefferson Airplane, were taken virtually word-for-word from a leaflet written by Motherfucker John Sundstrom, and published as "The Outlaw Page" in the East Village Other. The lyrics read in part, "We are all outlaws in the eyes of America. In order to survive we steal, cheat, lie, forge, fuck, hide, and deal... Everything you say we are, we are... Up Against the Wall, Motherfucker!" The song marked the first use of the word "fuck" on U.S. television, when the group played it uncensored on The Dick Cavett Show on August 19, 1969. This song also helped popularize the phrase as a counterculture rallying cry, over and beyond the immediate impact of the anarchist group.

At various times, the line became popular among several groups that came out of the sixties, from Black Panthers to feminists and even "rednecks." In 1968, David Peel and the Lower East Side included the song "Up against the Wall, Motherfucker" on their album entitled Have a Marijuana. In the 1970s, Texas country singer-songwriter Ray Wylie Hubbard adapted the famous phrase for a song he wrote entitled "Up Against the Wall, Redneck Mother". The phrase was also used as a song title on the album Penance Soiree by the Icarus Line. The line was famously shouted by Patty Hearst during the robbery of Hibernia Bank in San Francisco.

== Simulation game ==
In 1969, Columbia University history major Jim Dunnigan, who would later found Simulation Publications, Inc., published a simulation game in the March 11, 1969 edition of the Columbia Spectator named Up Against the Wall, Motherfucker! The game was based on recent disturbances at Columbia University and allowed the players to play either as protestors or administration with victory determined by winning over various stakeholder groups.
