= Cultural Correspondence =

Cultural Correspondence was a journal of leftist politics and cultural commentary published from 1975 to around 1985. Paul Buhle and Dave Wagner were its founding editors.

== History ==
Cultural Correspondence was part of a wave of cultural criticism journals founded in the 1970s that addressed popular culture. Paul Buhle and Dave Wagner had previously collaborated on Radical America, but after they moved to different locations, their letters to each other led to the idea for Cultural Correspondence. According to Buhle, the magazine was "born from the collapse of the New Left and hopes for a new beginning of a social movement, but also of left-wing thinking about culture". The first issue was introduced as such by the founding editors:

Here we are, a few months late and several theoretical documents short of where we expected to be by this time. Nonetheless, the work continues to evolve. The title of this publication should be self-explanatory: this is a way of saying to a few hundred readers what we have only been observing to each other for the past several years.

We expect to come out quarterly; perhaps CC will become a journal in time or perhaps only a way of advancing the notions of a cultural front within a Resurgent socialist movement.

This issue is mostly the two of us. We hope that will end. If you are interested in the discussion, please send us a letter. Following Crumb and d.a. levy, our attitude is that "it's only lines on paper, folks." Tell us if you want it published, and/or send us a few bucks or so to help us cover printing and mailing expenses.

DW & PB

The journal was originally published in Providence, Rhode Island. Some of the early issues were also produced in collaboration with the Green Mountain Irregulars.

Cultural Correspondence typically published leftist social commentary, with a particular emphasis on poetry, humor, and comics. Contributors to the magazine included: C. L. R. James, George Lipsitz, Edith Hoshino Altbach, Eva Cockcroft, and R. Crumb.

In May 1981, Paul Buhle and James Murray met on the way to an anti-Reagan demonstration. Following the fourteenth issue of Cultural Correspondence's initial run, Murray and Lucy Lippard collaborated with Buhle on a new series of Cultural Correspondence, as a project of Political Art Documentation/Distribution (PAD/D). After this, the magazine was published in New York. Around the same time in 1982, Cultural Correspondence also organized the Radical Humor Conference and Festival in New York, a conference of "Left-academic self-ridicule". The influence of PAD/D (with its interest in archiving and artistic activism) on Cultural Correspondence can be seen in the third issue of its new series, which deviated from the magazine's normal format by including a long directory of artistic political projects. That issue was titled We will not be disappeared!: Directory of Arts Activism.
