= The Many-Headed Hydra =

Book written by Marcus Rediker

The Many-Headed Hydra: Sailors, Slaves, Commoners, and the Hidden History of the Revolutionary Atlantic (2000) is a book by Marcus Rediker and Peter Linebaugh.

== Background ==
The Many-Headed Hydra: Sailors, Slaves, Commoners, and the Hidden History of the Revolutionary Atlantic is a book written by Marcus Rediker and Peter Linebaugh and published by Beacon Press on October 1, 2000. The Boston Review compared the book to The Making of the English Working Class by E. P. Thompson. A chapter of the book focuses on the New York Conspiracy. The premise of the book is that the discovery of sea routes to the Americas and East Indies made it more difficult for acolytes to keep control of the lower classes of society. The book continues Rediker's trend to focus on people's history.

Full Stop Magazine related the book to Amazon firing Chris Smalls and the various strikes during the COVID-19 pandemic

== Reception ==
The Publishers Weekly review states that "The authors are to be commended ... for recovering the voices of obscure folk". The Washington Post asserted that the book is "an effective mirror for our own time, as we reckon with the inequities and the violence [of] ... globalism". Foreign Affairs called the book a "riveting work".

David Brion Davis criticised the book in The New York Review of Books and Marcus Rediker and Peter Linebaugh responded.

== Adaptation ==
The book was adapted into a graphic novel titled Revolution by Fire: New York’s Afro-Irish Uprising of 1741, A Graphic Novel with illustrations by Paul Buhle.
