= Under the Banner of King Death =

Graphic novel about pirates

- Date: 2023
- Publisher: Beacon Press
- Writers: David Lester and Marcus Rediker
- Artist: David Lester
- Editor: Paul Buhle
- ISBN: 978-080702398-3

Under the Banner of King Death: Pirates of the Atlantic is a graphic novel by David Lester and Marcus Rediker.

== Background ==
The comic book is an adaptation of Rediker's 2005 book Villains of All Nations: Atlantic Pirates in the Golden Age. The 136 pages book was published by Beacon Press on February 7, 2023. The book is written by David Lester and edited by Paul Buhle. The story opens with a character named John Brown being hung for piracy. The protagonists are John Gwin, Ruben Dekker, and Mary Read who are all aboard a ship called The Night Rambler. Laboring as a sailor was dangerous and the leadership oppressive and violent, which often led to sailors mutinying and turning to piracy. The pirates would then elect their leaders.

== Reception ==
Publishers Weekly reviewed the book saying "It's wild, often inspiring material, if a bit shallow in its attempts at mythmaking."
