= Radical America =

American political magazine

- Early issues of Radical America bore the subtitle "An SDS Journal of the History of American Radicalism."
- Editor: Paul Buhle
- Categories: Radical media, marxism, New Left
- Frequency: Varied
- Founder: Paul Buhle; Mari Jo Buhle
- Founded: 1967
- First issue: April 1967
- Final issue: 1999
- Company: Alternative Education Project, Inc.
- Country: United States
- Based in: Madison, Wisconsin (initially); Somerville, Massachusetts (later)
- Language: English
- ISSN: 0033-7617

Radical America was a left-wing political magazine in the United States established in 1967. The magazine was founded by Paul Buhle and Mari Jo Buhle, activists in Students for a Democratic Society and served during its first few years of existence as an unofficial theoretical journal of that organization. During the 1970s and 1980s, the magazine changed to take on more of an academic Marxist flavor. With contributions from academics dwindling during the decade of the 1990s, the magazine was terminated in 1999.

== Publication history ==
=== Establishment ===
Radical America was founded by members of the Students for a Democratic Society (SDS) in 1967. The initial editors were Paul Buhle and Mari Jo Buhle in their graduate school days, operating in Madison, Wisconsin. In the first few years, it served as the "unofficial journal of SDS." Dan Georgakas wrote that its importance lay in that it "was on the scholarly cutting edge of a social movement that often has been accused of lacking intellectual substance.

Initially, subscriptions were sold at a discount rate to national SDS members. The Buhles relocated to the Boston, Massachusetts area, and brought the journal with them. By the time of the Boston move the journal was independent from the SDS.

=== Content ===
The journal, published in Somerville, Massachusetts, focused on topical issues of concern to the left and society at large, such as women's liberation, working class radicalism and busing. Beginning in 1970, each issue had a dedicated focus on one issue. Mainly, during the 1970s, the journal evolved in a direction concerned with New Left issues, rather than traditional, Old Left concern with strengthening ties with trade unions. It was particularly active in the 1970s, as authors related the experiences of feminist and autonomous work-place activists.

=== Circulation ===
According to the publication's published annual "Statement of Ownership, Management and Circulation" required by the Post Office Department, the average press run of Radical America for the twelve months ending in October 1982 was 4,100, with an average mail subscription of about 2,330. Bulk sales and sales through vendors accounted for another 1,270 copies, according to the 1982 report by editor John P. Demeter.

=== Demise ===
By the 1980s, the journal had branched to address gay issues and rock music. During the late 1980s, article contributions dwindled as academics left the journal.
