= Outlaws of the Atlantic =

Book written by Marcus Rediker

Outlaws of the Atlantic: Sailors, Pirates, and Motley Crews in the Age of Sail is a book by Marcus Rediker.

== Background ==
The book was written by Marcus Rediker and published by Beacon Press on August 12, 2014. Rediker notes that the modern day workers strike was invented by sailors in London 1768. Rediker argues in the book that the rebellions of sailors and slaves influenced the American Revolution and anti-slavery movement. Rediker notes that history books tend to focus on events occurring on land and neglect the many historical developments that took place at sea. Rediker argues in the book that sailors often created or influenced the philosophies and beliefs of the time. The book is a people's history of various maritime professions. Each chapter builds on themes and ideas explored in his earlier works.

== Reception ==
Paddy Nielsen wrote in the Socialist Worker that the book is a "must-read for anyone interested in maritime history".
