= Political Art Documentation/Distribution =

American leftist art collective

Cover for PAD/D's Upfront, Issue 8

Political Art Documentation/Distribution (PAD/D) was an American leftist art collective based in New York City and dedicated to artistic activism. Their primary aim was to "provide artists with an organized relationship to society, to demonstrate the political effectiveness of image making, and to provide a framework within which progressive artists can discuss and develop alternatives to the mainstream art system." The collective was active from around 1980 to 1988, when its 501(c)(3) non-profit status formally expired, and was based out of 339 Lafayette Street for several years. PAD/D was originally founded by Lucy Lippard, Margia Kramer, and Gregory Sholette, among others.

Lucy Lippard claims that one of her early inspirations for PAD/D was the London art scene and its dedication to combining political and community art, as well the work of London-based artists like Susan Hiller and Alexis Hunter. One of its early actions was the "Image War on the Pentagon", which took place on May 3, 1981, and consisted of artists marching with anti-war poster designs in Washington, D.C., and New York.

As part of its mission, PAD/D published UPFRONT, a magazine on arts and activism, and Red Letter Days, "a calendar of leftist and activist events", and the collective organized exhibitions on the topics of gentrification, the US military budget, and political propaganda. The PAD/D collective also oversaw several issues of Cultural Correspondence, a publication inspired by the New Left, near the end of that magazine's existence. In 1982, PAD/D also collaborated with Cultural Correspondence to publish an audiovisual art slideshow entitled "We want to live! Artworks for peace, June 12, 1982".

A large collection of PAD/D publications and ephemera are held in the Museum of Modern Art archive.

== General References ==
- Sholette, Gregory. "A Collectography of PAD/D Political Art Documentation and Distribution: A 1980's Activist Art and Networking Collective" (PDF). Groups and Spaces.
- Sholette, Gregory; Koenig, Janet (2006). "Political Art Documentation/Distribution (PAD/D)". In Bronson, AA (ed.). "Group Work" (Interview). Interviewed by Brett Bloom. Temporary Services. ISBN 0-89439-021-X.
- Perr, Joey (2017). "Artists Meeting for Cultural Change". Guernica. Short biographical comic about author's father and his work in PAD/D
