= Ben Morea =

American painter and anarchist activist (1941–2026)

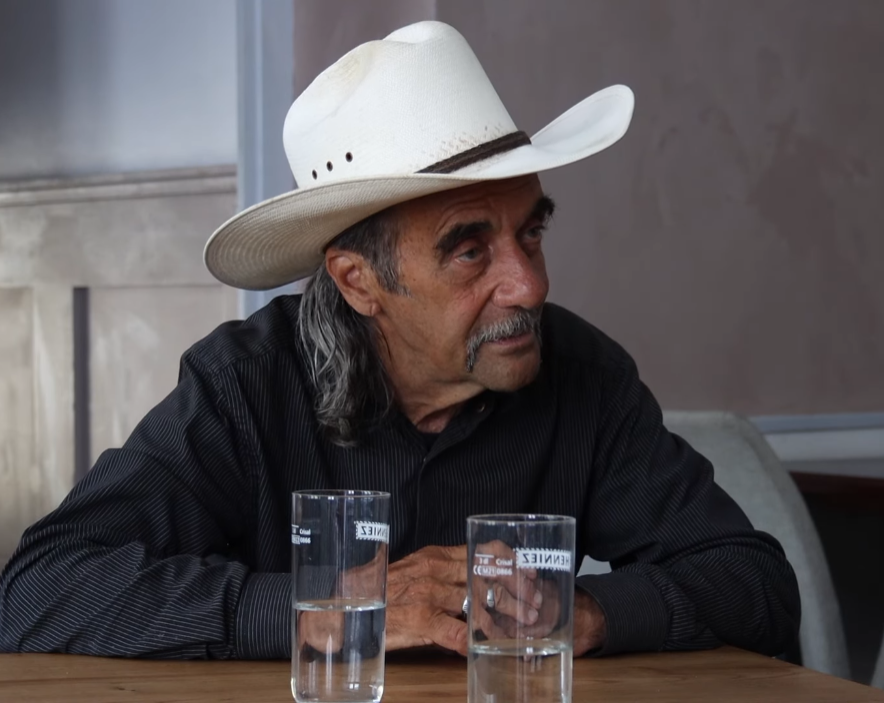
- Morea in 2024
- Born: Benjamin Anthony Morea; October 8, 1941; New York City, U.S.
- Died: May 2, 2026 (aged 84); Gardner, Colorado, U.S.
- Occupations: Painter, activist

Benjamin Anthony Morea (October 8, 1941 – May 2, 2026) was an American painter, anarchist activist, and co-founder of Up Against the Wall Motherfucker. He was a friend of social theorist Murray Bookchin and of radical feminist Valerie Solanas.

== Life and career ==
Benjamin Anthony Morea was born into poverty in Brooklyn, New York City, on October 8, 1941. He became addicted to heroin and discovered painting while incarcerated and in drug rehabilitation. In the 1960s, he adopted a style of abstract expressionism and befriended the co-founders of the Living Theatre. In 1966, he co-founded the group Black Mask alongside Dan Georgakas, along with a semi-monthly newspaper of the same name. Today, the newspapers are of tremendous value, often reaching hundreds of dollars. The group participated in Angry Arts Week in 1967.

In 1968, the name "Black Mask" was changed to Up Against the Wall Motherfucker, which essentially operated as a street gang. The gang carried out most of its activities in the Lower East Side and staunchly supported the events of May 68. After the group's dissolution, Morea and his wife moved to the Sangre de Cristo Wilderness in Colorado. In 2023, he attended the St. Imier Anti-Authoritarian International Gathering in Switzerland.

Ben Morea died on May 2, 2026, after collapsing at his property in Gardner, Colorado, at the age of 84.
