= Wendy Z. Goldman =

American historian (born 1956)

- Born: 1956 (age 69–70); New York City
- Spouse: Marcus Rediker

Academic background
- Education: University of Pennsylvania
- Thesis: (1987)

Wendy Z. Goldman is an American historian, currently the Paul Mellon distinguished professor at Carnegie Mellon University. Her current works involve the history of Joseph Stalin.

She is married to historian of pirates Marcus Rediker.

== Selected publications ==
- Women, the state, and revolution : Soviet family policy and social life, 1917-1936 (1993)
- Women at the gates : gender and industry in Stalin's Russia (2002)
- Terror and democracy in the age of Stalin : the social dynamics of repression (2007)
- Inventing the enemy : denunciation and terror in Stalin's Russia (2011)
- Hunger and war : food provisioning in the Soviet Union during World War II (2015)
