= 339 Lafayette Street =

Building in Manhattan, New York

Coordinates: 40°43′34″N 73°59′39″W

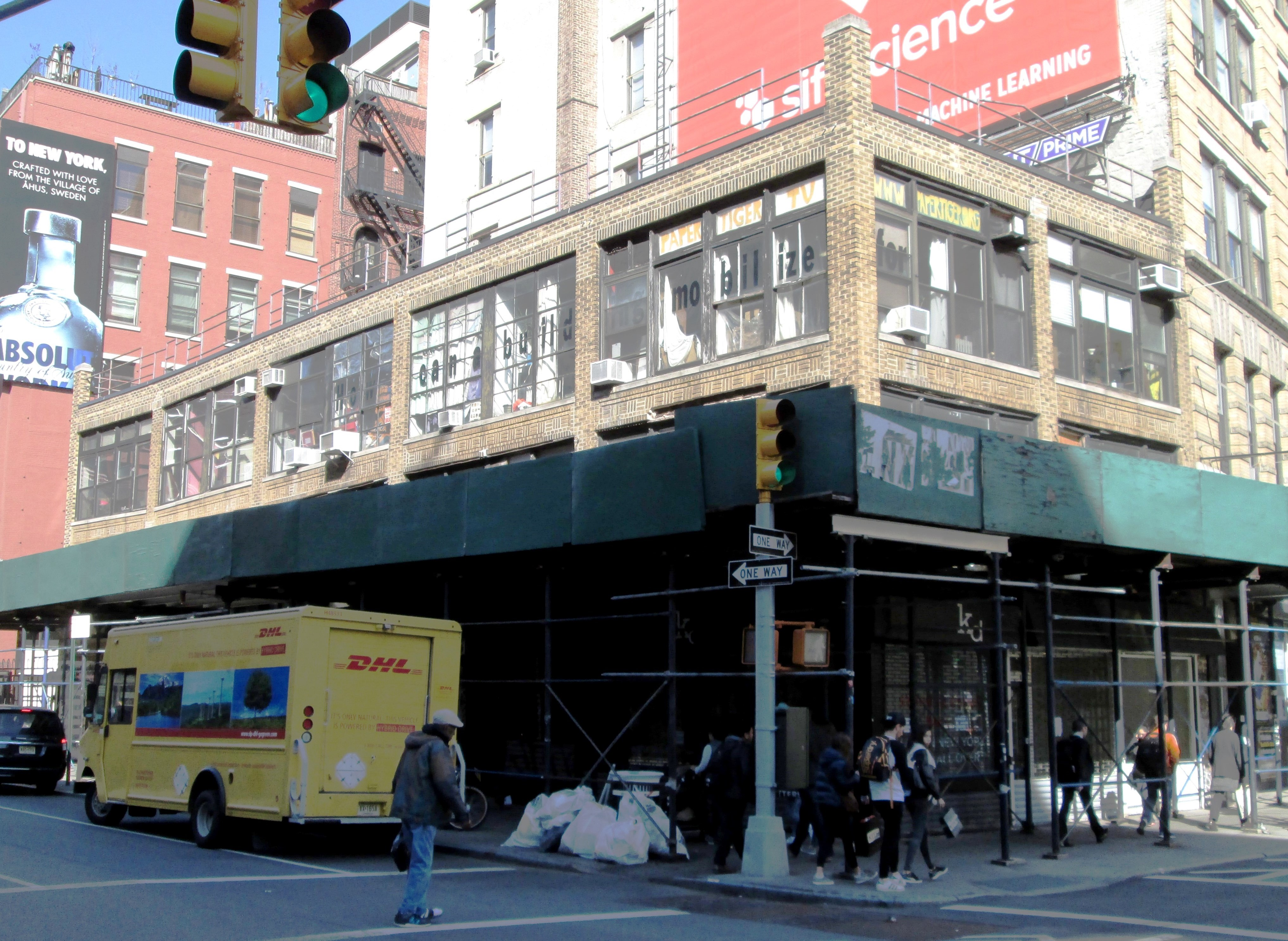
The building in 2016, with construction scaffolding around it

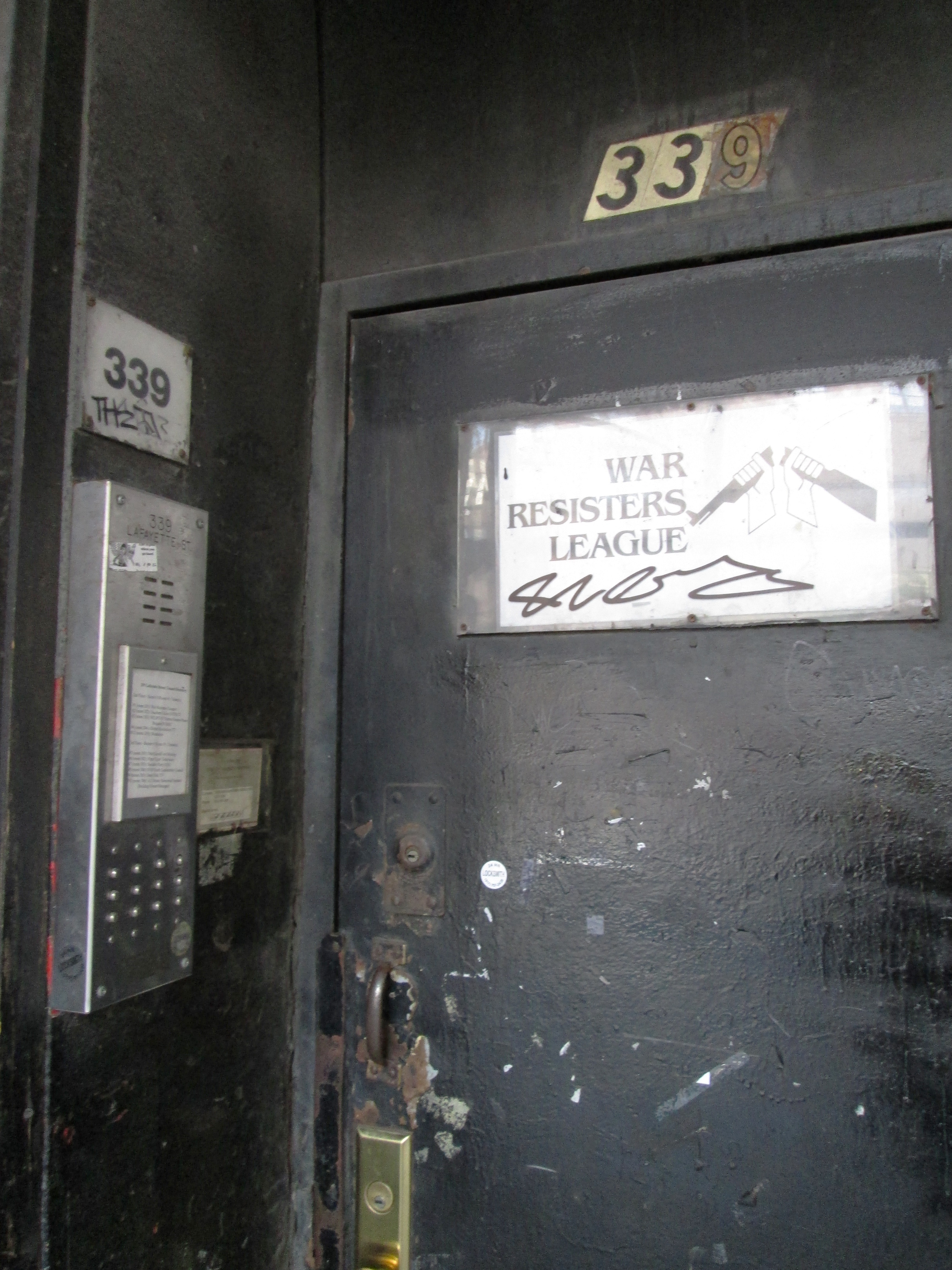
The front door of the building, showing the War Resisters League sign

339 Lafayette Street, nicknamed the Peace Pentagon, and officially numbered 339-345, is a building in the NoHo neighborhood of Manhattan, New York City known in the late 20th and early 21st century for the many left-wing and radical activist and political organizations headquartered there. The building was completed c.1920.

== History ==
The War Resisters League began to rent the building in 1968, and purchased it in 1974 for $60,000.

In 1978 the A. J. Muste Institute bought the building from the War Resisters League for $91,000. For decades the Institute provided office space to politically congenial activist organizations at below-market rates.

In October 2015, the building was sold to the real estate holding company 337 Lafayette L.P., owned by developer Aby Rosen.

Organizations with headquarters in the building have included the Granny Peace Brigade, the National Committee to Reopen the Rosenberg Case, the NYCORG - New York Organizing Project of NYSUT, the Socialist Party USA, the Metropolitan Council on Housing, Women's Pentagon Action, The Teachers Committee for Peace in Vietnam, Catholic Peace Fellowship, Episcopal Churchmen for South Africa, the New York Anti-Nuclear Group, the Infant Formula Action Coalition, Art for Social Change, Political Art Documentation/Distribution, the Fund for Open Information and Accountability, NYC Shut It Down, and Paper Tiger Television.
