= Peter Schumann =

Puppet theater director (born 1934)

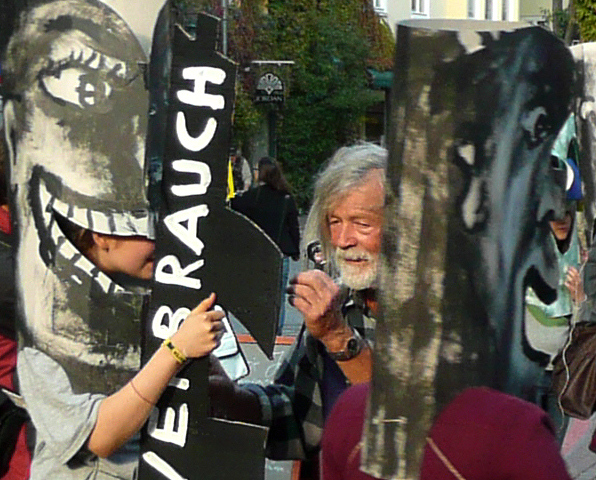
- Peter Schumann, 2010
- Born: June 11, 1934 (age 92); Lubin, Silesia
- Education: Hochschule der Bildende Kuenste, Berlin
- Occupations: Puppeteer; director; painter
- Years active: 1963–present
- Works: Our Domestic Resurrection Circus
- Spouse: Elka Schumann
- Children: 5

Peter Schumann (born 11 June 1934) is the co-founder and director of the radical puppet theater company Bread & Puppet Theater. Born in Silesia, he was a sculptor and dancer in Germany before moving to the United States in 1961. In 1963 he founded Bread & Puppet in New York City, and in 1970 moved to the Northeast Kingdom of Vermont, eventually settling in Glover, Vermont, where the company still performs. Schumann's best known work is the Domestic Resurrection Circus, performed annually by the Bread and Puppet Theater until 1998. He was married to theater co-founder Elka Schumann until her death in August 2021.

== Career ==
=== The Bread and Puppet Theater ===
Peter Schumann and his wife Elka co-founded the politically radical, community-based puppet theater company Bread and Puppet Theater in 1963 in New York City. The theater is named for its combination of puppetry shows with free freshly baked bread, generally served with a dipping sauce. The company is known, according to The Buffalo News for "anarchic, noncommercial, participatory and politically charged approach to art." Among the notable Bread and Puppet Theater shows directed by Schumann are "Nativity 1992", described by The New York Times as "an exemplar of performance folk art", and "The Divine Reality Comedy". He also participated in the Angry Arts week in January 1967.

In 2023, Jon Kalish of VTDigger noted that Schulmann attracted some controversy over his position on the 2022 Russian invasion of Ukraine. Schumann stated that the conflict was the result of American warmongering and opposed U.S., European Union, and NATO military aid to Ukraine. Schumann also accused the Western media of ignoring Ukraine's neo-Nazi presence, an accusation Holocaust historian Michael Berenbaum disputed. Several theater members questioned Schumann's response, with former member Ian Thal stating that Schulmann's "reflexive anti-Americanism overrules any sympathy he might have for the Ukrainians. It renders Schumann unwilling to criticize Putin’s government or geopolitical ambitions”.

== Notable works ==
=== The Domestic Resurrection Circus ===
After Bread & Puppet's first decade in New York City, Schumann decided to take an offer from Goddard College in Plainfield, Vermont, to become the college's first theater-in-residence. After a few years, Schumann composed his first Domestic Resurrection Circus. Blending vaudeville comedy with political commentary, as well as the company's trademark giant puppets, the Circus became a tradition each summer. After Schumann moved to Glover, Vermont, in 1973, the Circuses continued. The Domestic Resurrection Circus's last year was 1998, when over 30,000 people attended. Since then, a smaller circus is performed every weekend during the summer.

=== Palestine exhibits ===
In 2007 Schumann premiered "Independence Paintings: Inspired by Four Stories" in Boston and Burlington, Vermont. The series was inspired by ten days Schumann spent in the Occupied Territories of Palestine, as well as John Hersey's 'The Wall', a graphic account of the birth, development, and destruction of the Warsaw Ghetto, the largest of the Jewish ghettos established by Nazi Germany during the Jewish Holocaust. The series proved controversial, accusations Schumann denied, stating that "I'm not saying that what's happening in Palestine is the same as what happened in Warsaw ... but it's certainly a reminder." While Schumann later acknowledged that he "may have unnecessarily hurt some people's feelings" with the series, he returned in 2008 to the theme of the Israeli–Palestinian conflict in his subsequent art series, "The University of Majd: The Story of a Palestinian Youth", which addresses a case of false imprisonment in Israel.

=== The Persians ===
In the summer of 2021, Schumann adapted Aeschylus's 472 BCE tragedy "The Persians," which then toured to Vermont, Chicago, New York, and Connecticut. The production included a prologue called "Homo Sapiens, Humanity, and the Chair," which used cantastoria storytelling technique with a series of bedsheet paintings mounted sequentially on wooden poles. The prologue featured two characters—a masked "Homo Sapiens" and an unmasked "Humanity" character —and depicted Humanity becoming "unglued from the Chair" to introduce the ancient Greek play. According to Schumann's text, Humanity announces that "The Persians, written by Mr. Aeschylus," is "no celebration whatsoever, but instead a giant lamentation for the defeated archenemy." The production incorporated thirteen bedsheet paintings specifically created for the show, representing part of Schumann's practice of using his painted works as theatrical elements during this period of his career from 2020-2023.

== Published works ==
- Puppen und Masken. Das Bread and Puppet Theater, Fischer, Frankfurt am Main/Germany, 1973.
- Bread and Puppet Theater - THIS IS, 1980.
- Bread and Puppet: HALLELUJAH, 1983.
- Uprising of the Beast After the Good Life Fails, 1987.
- White Horse Butcher, 1988.
- Bible, 1991.
- The Radicality of the Puppet Theater, 1991.
- St. Francis Preaches to the Birds, 1992.
- The old art of puppetry in the new world order, 1993.
- Bread: A lecture to art students at SUNY/Purchase, New York. 1987, reprint 1994.
- Bread & Puppet. Green Man, 1996.
- Life of a Squirrel, 1996.
- What, At the End of This Century, Is the Situation of Puppets and Performing Objects?, 1999.
- Puppet Uprising: Peter Schumman's Bread & Puppet Theater, 2003.
- Planet Kasper: Comix and Tragix, 2011.
- Shatterer Book, 2013.
- Bread & Sentences, 2015.
- Planet Kasper Volume Two: Comix & Tragix, 2015.
- Faust 3, 2016.
- Theatrum Mundi, 2017.
- Riot, 2017.
- Life and Death of Charlotte Salomon, 2018.
- We, 2018.
- From the Possibilitarian Arsenal of Belligerent and Not So Belligerent Slogans, 2018.
- Diagonal Man Theory + Praxis: Volume I, 2019.
- Diagonal Man Theory + Praxis: Volume 2, 2019.
- A Child's Deprimer, 2019.
- Bedsheet Mitigations, 2020.
- All, Nothing, Nothing At All, 2020.
- Handouts and Obligations, 2021.
- Declaration of Light, 2021.
- Es Ist Vollbracht - Mission Accomplished, 2021.
- She Sits She Rides She Flies, 2021.
- Kropotkin Says, 2023.
- Tears Clouds Trees, 2023.
- Gaza Genocide Bedsheets, 2023.
- Mister Aeschylus' The Persians, 2024.
- We Possibilitarians One, 2024.
