= Pageant Players =

The Pageant Players were a quasi-Marxist guerrilla street theatre group active in New York City from 1965 to 71. Their first performance was of The Paper Tiger Pageant in November 1965. They were founded by Michael Brown. They participated in Angry Arts week in January 1967.
