= Margia Kramer =

American documentary artist

- Born: 1939 (age 86–87); Brooklyn, New York City, NY
- Known for: Documentary art, video installations, multi-media, videos, artist's books focused on the Freedom of Information Act and declassified government documents
- Notable work: Essential Documents, The FBI File on Jean Seberg, Part I, Part II (1979); Secret I (1980) floor installation with pamphlet, Artists Space Gallery, New York; Secret III, Secret IV (1980) window installations with pamphlets, Printed Matter and Franklin Furnace, New York; Secret VI (1980) video installation, Institute of Contemporary Arts, London; Freedom of Information Tapes 1-3, (1980-1985); American Film Institute First and Fifth Annual Video Festivals (1981, 1985); Jean Seberg/The FBI/The Media (1981) video installation, book, Museum of Modern Art, New York; Progress/Memory II (1984) video installation, Whitney Museum of American Art, New York; Jean Seberg in Issue: Social Strategies by Women Artists (1980) Institute of Contemporary Arts, London; Progress/Memory in Making Their Mark: Women Artists Move Into the Mainstream 1970 to 1985 (1988-1990) United States (multiple showings); Rehnquist to Hear Black Panther Case in Committed to Print (1988-1990) Museum of Modern Art, New York; Andy Warhol et al. The FBI File on Andy Warhol (1988) book; Looking at Militarism (1989) film and video installation, List Visual Arts Center, Massachusetts Institute of Technology; I a WO/MAN (1989) video and film installation, San Francisco Artspace; Jean Seberg in Postcards from Alphaville: Jean Luc Godard in Contemporary Art 1963-1992 (1992-1993), P.S.1, Institute for Contemporary Art, New York; CIA Screen in Democracy and Politics (1993), group material at Dia Art Foundation, New York

Margia Kramer (born 1939) is an American documentary visual artist, writer and activist living in New York. In the 1970s and 1980s, Kramer recontextualized primary texts in a series of pioneering, interdisciplinary multi-media installations, videotapes, self-published books, and writings that focused on feminist, civil rights, civil liberties, censorship, and surveillance issues.

== Overview ==
Margia Kramer is an American documentary visual artist, writer and activist living in New York. In the 1970s and 1980s, Kramer recontextualized primary texts in a series of pioneering, interdisciplinary multi-media installations, videotapes, self-published books, and writings that focused on feminist, civil rights, civil liberties, censorship, and surveillance issues. Her works have been widely exhibited, including over 15 one-person shows, and over 40 group exhibitions at (1979); the Institute of Contemporary Arts in London (1980); the Museum of Modern Art (1981); the Whitney Museum of American Art (1984); Los Angeles Contemporary Exhibitions (LACE, 1987); the Rotunda Gallery in Brooklyn, NY (1988); the List Visual Arts Center of the Massachusetts Institute of Technology (1989); San Francisco Artspace (1989); P.S. 1 (1992); The Institute for Contemporary Art (1993); the Dia Art Foundation (1993); the American Film Institute Video Festivals; and at museums, galleries, and alternative spaces in the U.S. and abroad. Kramer's videos and installation works are in the permanent collections of the Museum of Modern Art, Allen Memorial Art Museum, New York Public Library, and in the private collection of Albert and Vera List, among other private and public collections.

In the 1970s and 1980s, using the United States' Freedom of Information Act (1967), Kramer sourced and requested, from the United States Federal Bureau of Investigation (FBI) and Central Intelligence Agency (CIA), specific documents and dossiers. Kramer presented these original FBI and CIA documents to the public in her art works, exactly as they were released to her, including redactions, and unchanged in text and format. To underscore the inherent repressiveness of the official government documents' deletions and redactions, Kramer's creative process included enlarging or reducing their scale, shifting their positive/negative ratios (documents were made into negatives and enlarged), and changing the materials upon which they were printed from paper to transparent film. Kramer transformed the hieratic, primary materials into installations of giant negative photostats on transparent film that were suspended on threads from ceilings to cast shadows on surrounding walls. The large scale, hanging black rectangles and trenchant white to black positive/negative forms where redactions and texts became transparent, combined to create a chilling but compelling atmosphere that was simultaneously oppressive and informative.

By making art that highlighted the specific contents of the documents she received, Kramer was able to demonstrate their undercover strategies, as well as their negative emotional and material impact on the lives of United States citizens protected by the United States Constitution's Bill of Rights. These works centered on issues around feminism, censorship, civil liberties, and civil rights, all in the context of government surveillance. In particular, Kramer made a series of videos, documentary books, and installations on subjects of state counterintelligence programs ("cointelpro") including the actress Jean Seberg, and the artist, filmmaker, and impresario/provocateur Andy Warhol.

== Photographs of major works ==
Window installation (exterior/interior), "Secret III," 1980, Printed Matter Bookstore, Lispenard Street, NYC. Pages from Jean Seberg's FBI File received by the artist from the FBI using the Freedom of Information Act. Enlarged pages from the file printed on transparent film, plus a self-published pamphlet with an introduction by the artist and including more facsimile pages from the File. Photograph by Margia Kramer.

Video installation with multi-media. Enlarged negative photostats on transparent film of facsimiles of 4 pages from the FBI File on Jean Seberg and a New York Times article, "Rehnquist To Hear Black Panther Case," 20 minute videotape "Freedom of Information Tape 1, Jean Seberg" (1980) by Margia Kramer. "Jean Seberg/The FBI/The Media," a pamphlet by Margia Kramer. Approximately 12" x 12." In the exhibition, "Issue: Social Strategies by Women Artists,"Institute of Contemporary Art, London. Photograph by Margia Kramer.

Facsimiles of pages from the FBI File on Jean Seberg included copies of pages from relevant magazine and newspaper articles, an original 20 minute videotape "Freedom of Information Tape 1, Jean Seberg" by Margia Kramer, an original handbook, "Jean Seberg/The FBI/The Media" by Margia Kramer, enlarged negative photostats on transparent film of file pages, and positive photostats on paper of relevant magazine and newspaper articles. Approx. 25' x 25' The exhibition encompassed a Jean Seberg Film Festival held at the Donnell Library and Carnegie Hall Cinema, a special screening of Seberg as "St. Joan" at MOMA, and a panel discussion "Freedom of Information and the Arts," moderated by Margia Kramer, at the Donnell Library. Photograph by the Margia Kramer.

"Address Book Triptych" (1987-1988). Multi-media triptych. Enlarged negative photostats on transparent film of facsimiles of declassified, redacted pages of opponents of the Vietnam War. From the FBI files requested by the artist using the Freedom of Act. Teak frames with Plexiglas, 22" x 51" (3 panels). Photograph by Margia Kramer.

"CIA Screen" (1987-1988). Multi-media four-panel folding screen. Enlarged negative photostats on transparent film of facsimile of a 4-page recruitment brochure published by the Central Intelligence Agency (CIA) for its Clandestine Service. Teak frames with Plexiglas, 72" x 80" (4 panels). In the exhibition "Democracy and Politics," (1988) curated by Group Material at the Dia Art Foundation, New York. Photograph by the Margia Kramer.

"Looking At Militarism" (1989). Multi-media installation with film and video. Enlarged negative photostats on transparent film, with teak frames, of facsimiles of documents from MIT archives, government defense programs, war and peace initiatives, budget priorities, newspaper articles, and other relevant documents. Archival film footage from Hiroshima and Nagasaki showing the effects of nuclear war. Original video interviews by the artist on the subject of peace activism with MIT Professors Vera Kistiakowsky and Noam Chomsky. Approximately 40' x 50'. List Visual Arts Center, Massachusetts Institute of Technology. Photograph by Margia Kramer.

"I a WO/MAN: The FBI File on Andy Warhol" (1989). Mixed media installation. Enlarged negative photostats on transparent film, with redwood frames, of facsimiles of redacted pages from Andy Warhol's FBI File — using the Freedom of Information Act, the artist requested that the file be declassified following Warhol's death. The large photostats were hung from the ceiling over 30' long, horizontal platform that concealed all but the screens of video monitors pointed towards the ceiling, continuously playing three, commercially released Warhol/Morrisey films: Flesh, Trash, and Heat. Pamphlet by Margia Kramer, "Andy Warhol et al. The FBI File on Andy Warhol" (New York, 1988). Approximately 25' x 40'. San Francisco Artspace. Includes "The Warhol File," by Margia Kramer from The Village Voice, May 1988. Photograph by Bonnie Burt.

== Affiliations ==
Kramer was among the founding members (along with Lucy Lippard) of Political Art Documentation/Distribution (PAD/D), and was a member of the editorial board of its magazine, Upfront, to which she contributed two articles. PAD/D's archive is now housed in the library of the Museum of Modern Art in New York City.

== Videography ==
- 1988 "Taking the Fifth" (1/2" 10 min.). Margia Kramer comments on footage from Oliver North's testimony during the Iran Contra Hearings (1987), contrasted with witness testimony during the Army-McCarthy Hearings (1954). Also, contains comments by Edward R. Murrow. This tape was part of Kramer's installation, "Unknown Secrets," a traveling exhibition about Julius and Ethel Rosenberg, that toured museums, galleries, and alternative spaces throughout USA from 1988-1990
- 1989 "Looking at Militarism: Two Interviews "(1/2" 60 min.) Margia Kramer's interviews with activist Prof. Noam Chomsky of MIT and peace activist Prof. Vera Kistiakowsky of MIT, part of Kramer's 1989 multi-media installation "Looking at Militarism" at MIT
- 1985 "Freedom of Information Tape 3; The Guerrilla Manual for the Contras in Nicaragua" (3/4" 4 min.) Margia Kramer turns the pages and reads from a copy of the original manual distributed by the United States government in 1984
- 1984 "Progress (Memory) A Video Installation" (3/4" 5 min.) Margia Kramer videotapes, with voice-over, part of Kramer's 1984 video installation at the Whitney Museum of American Art
- 1983 "Freedom of Information Tape 2: Progress and Access" (3/4" 36 min.) Margia Kramer interviews several internet pioneers who are developing the World Wide Web. Includes an interview with the 1973 Noble Laureate in Economics, Wassily Leontief, Director of NYU's Institute for Economic Analysis, about automation and the future of work
- 1982 "No More Witchhunts, A Street Festival" (3/4" 15 min.) 1980. With hand-held camera, Kramer interviews participants while roaming the activist street fair that was held near The Cooper Union in New York. The festival was directed and curated by Margia Kramer with PAD/D and The Fund for Open Information and Accountability
- 1980 "Freedom of Information Tape 1; Jean Seberg "' (3/4" 18 min.) A dramatic recounting of Jean Seberg's life, career, and death combining voice-over enactments of texts from Seberg's writings and magazine interviews, original and appropriated footage and voice-over, archival film stills, and excerpts from the film "Breathless," (1960) by Jean-Luc Godard

== Writings ==
Publications by Margia Kramer

- 1988 "Andy Warhol et al: The FBI File on Andy Warhol" New York (64 pages, self-published, UnSub Press)
- 1981 "Jean Seberg/The FBI/The Media" New York (self published, 40 pages)
- 1980 "Essential Documents: The FBI File on Jean Seberg Part II" New York (self published, 40 pages)
- 1979 "Essential Documents: The FBI File on Jean Seberg Part I" New York ( self-published, 40 pages)

Other original writings

- Artist's Statement, 1980 "Secret I," Artists Space Gallery, New York, April 22, 1979
- Artist's Statement, "Obelisk for Raymond Williams, commissioned by The Public Art Fund for City Hall Park, New York, May 15-November 15, 1988
- Cieri, Marie, Dana Friis Hansen, Katy Kline, Helaine Posner (with Margia Kramer, contributor). "19 Projects, Artists-in-Residence at the MIT List Visual Arts Center," Cambridge, Mass, 1996, p. 133-144
- Kramer, Margia. "Cracking the Concrete: Interventionist Posters," Upfront, Winter 1986/87 (New York), p.iiif
- Kramer, Margia. "Disinformation Warfare, A Breaking of Codes in Painting and Video," Red Bass, Women's International Arts Issue #10, Winter/Spring 1986 (Tallahassee), p. 9f
- Kramer, Margia. "Notes on Art as Intervention," Women Artists News, May 1980 (New York), p.l4f
- Kramer, Margia. "Notes on Expression/Repression," Wedge: An Aesthetic Inquiry, Number 1, Summer 1982 (New York), p. 30f
- Kramer, Margia and Vanalyn Green. "Against Inner Exile," Upfront 2, Winter 1981/82 (New York), p. 30f
- Kramer, Margia. "The Warhol File," The Village Voice (New York), 5/17/88
- In Okun, Rob A. (ed.) "The Rosenbergs, Collected Visions of Artists and Writers," New York, 1988, p. 31,157 (Artist Statement), Plate 40
- In O'Pray, Michael (ed.) "Andy Warhol: Film Factory," London (British Film Institute) 1989, p. 9, 178f. Includes ' The Warhol File," by Margia Kramer from The Village Voice, May 1988
- In Roman, Gail Harrison (ed.) "The Artist's Perception 1948/1984," Catalogue of the exhibition with Artist's Statement and Introduction by Gail Harrison Roman, Vassar College Art Gallery, March 23 - May 6, 1984

== Selected works ==
- "Essential Documents, The FBI File on Jean Seberg, Part I, Part II" (1979) by Margia Kramer
- "Secret I" (1980) floor installation with pamphlet, Artists Space Gallery, New York
- "Secret III" "Secret IV" (1980) window installations with pamphlets, Printed Matter and Franklin Furnace, New York
- "Secret VI" (1980) video installation, Institute of Contemporary Arts, London
- "Freedom of Information Tapes 1-3," (1980-1985)
- "American Film Institute First and Fifth Annual Video Festivals," (1981, 1985)
- "Progress/Memory II (1984) video installation, Whitney Museum of American Art, New York
- "Jean Seberg" in "Issue: Social Strategies by Women Artists" (1980), Institute of Contemporary Arts, London
- "Progress/Memory" in "Making Their Mark: Women Artists Move Into the Mainstream 1970 to 1985" (1989-1990) United States (multiple showings) 1988-90
- "Address Triptych" (1987-1988) in 1990 exhibition, "A Different War: Vietnam in Art," at the Whatcom Museum, Seattle WA
- "CIA Screen," in "Democracy and Politics," (1993), Group Material at Dia Art Foundation, New York
- "Rehnquist to Hear Black Panther Case," in "Committed to Print" (1988-1990), Museum of Modern Art, New York
- "Andy Warhol et al. The FBI File on Andy Warhol" (1988) Book
- "Looking at Militarism" (1989), film and video installation, List Visual Arts Center, Massachusetts Institute of Technology
- "I a WO/MAN" (1989), video and film installation, San Francisco Artspace
- "Jean Seberg" in "Postcards from Alphaville: Jean Luc Godard in Contemporary Art 1963-1992" (1992-1993), P.S.1, Institute for Contemporary Art, New York

== Selected exhibitions ==
One-person exhibitions:

- 1989 "I a WO/MAN" San Francisco Artspace, San Francisco, California
- 1989 "Looking at Militarism" List Visual Arts Center, M.I.T., Cambridge, Massachusetts
- 1988 "Obelisk, for Raymond Williams" City Hall Park, New York (The Public Art Fund)
- 1988 "War and Peace" Rotunda Gallery, Brooklyn, New York
- 1986 "Freedom of Information Tapes 1-3," Anthology Film Archives, Millennium Film Workshop, New York
- 1984 "Progress (Memory)" video installation, New American Filmmakers Series, Whitney Museum of Art, New York
- 1984 "Progress and Access" computer and video installation, Vassar College Art Gallery, Poughkeepsie, New York
- 1983 "Progress (Memory) I" video installation, Visual Studies Workshop, Rochester, New York
- 1981 "Jean Seberg/The FBI/The Media" video installation with pamphlet, Museum of Modern Art, New York
- 1981 "Let and Right" video installation with books and pamphlets, A Space Gallery, Toronto, Canada
- 1981 "Jean Seberg" video installation with books/pamphlets, Artemesia Gallery, Chicago, Illinois
- 1980 "Secret VI" video installation with pamphlets, Institute of Contemporary Art, London, England
- 1980 "Secret III" "Secret IV" window installations with pamphlets, Printed Matter and Franklin Furnace, New York
- 1980 "10 Year Retrospective" Duke University Art Gallery, Durham, North Carolina
- 1980 "Secret I" floor installation with pamphlet, Artists Space Gallery, New York

Group exhibitions:

- 2015 "Learn to Read: A Surviving History of Printed Matter," Fales Library, New York University, New York
- 2014 "Behind the Personal Library: Collectors Creating the Canon," Center for Book Arts, New York
- 2014 "The Library Vaccine," Artists Space Books and Talks, NY
- 2004 "The C Series," Nathan Cummings Foundation, New York
- 2003 "American Tableaux," Miami Art Museum, Florida
- 1993 "Women Artists' Books 1969-1979," Dia Art Foundation and Printed Matter, New York
- 1992-93 "Postcards from Alphaville: Jean Luc Godard in Contemporary Art 1963-1992," P.S.1 (The Institute for Contemporary Art), New York
- 1989-92 "A Different War: Vietnam in Art," traveled from Akron Art Museum throughout U.S.
- 1989-90 "Image World: Art and Media Culture," Whitney Museum of American Art, New York
- 1989-90 "Making Their Mark: Women Artists Move Into the Mainstream 1970 to 1985," from Cincinnati Art Museum toured the US
- 1988-90 "Committed to Print," traveled from Museum of Modern Art New York throughout North America
- 1988-90 "Unknown Secrets," a traveling exhibition about Julius and Ethel Rosenberg, toured museums, galleries, and alternative spaces throughout US
- 1989 "Artists' Books: An Alternative Space for Art" Akron Art Museum, Akron, Ohio
- 1988 "Democracy and Politics," Group Material, Dia Art Foundation, New York
- 1987 "Social Engagement: Women's Video in the 80's," Whitney Museum of American Art, New York
- 1987 "Surveillance," LACE (Los Angeles Contemporary Exhibitions), Los Angeles, California
- 1987 "Urban Images of the 80's," Exit Art Gallery, New York
- 1986 "The Law and Order Show," Barbara Gladstone Gallery, New York
- 1986 "Cinemaobject," City Gallery, NYC Department of Cultural Affairs, New York
- 1985 "American Film Institute Fifth Annual Video Festival," Los Angeles, California
- 1985 "WorldWide Video Festival," Kijkhuis, The Hague, the Netherlands
- 1985 "Disinformation," The Alternative Museum, New York
- 1984 "Women and the Media, New Video," Allen Memorial Art Museum, Oberlin, Ohio
- 1983 "Ninth Annual Global Village Documentary Festival," Global Village. New York
- 1983 "Not Misinformation," P.S. 122 Gallery, New York
- 1983 "The Artist's Use of Language," Franklin Furnace, New York
- 1982-83 "CAPS Traveling Video Festival," New York State Council on the Arts, New York
- 1982 "Not Misinformation," Rutgers University Art Gallery, New Brunswick, New Jersey
- 1981 "American Film Institute First Annual Video Festival," Kennedy Center, Washington, D.C.
- 1980 "Issue: Social Strategies by Women Artists," Institute of Contemporary Arts, London, England (curated by Lucy Lippard)
- 1980 "Group," Group Material Gallery, New York
- 1980 "Women Artists' Books," AIR Gallery, New York 1980, "Vigilance" Franklin Furnace, New York,
- 1979 "Group," 112 Workshop, 112 Greene Street, New York
- 1976 "Scale," The Fine Arts Building, New York
- 1975 "Group," 112 Greene Street Gallery, New York
- 1974 "Vera List Selects," Hurlbutt Gallery, Connecticut
- 1974 "Continuing Abstraction in American Art," Downtown Branch, Whitney Museum of American Art, New York
- 1974 "New Talent Show," Betty Parsons Gallery, New York

== Awards ==
- 1989-90 National Endowment for the Arts, Artist Fellowship
- 1988-89 Massachusetts Council on the Arts and Humanities, New Works Grant
- 1983 Visual Studies Workshop Commission, New Video Installation
- 1982 National Endowment for the Arts, Artist Fellowship
- 1982 New York State Council on the Arts, CAPS Artist Fellowship
- 1987-88 New York Foundation for the Arts, Artist's Fellowship
- 1988 Public Art Fund, Inc.: Commission for Sculpture, "Revolution, for Raymond Williams," City Hall Park, New York
- 1986 New York State Council on the Arts, Visual Arts Grant
- 1985 Jerome Foundation Grant, New Video Installation, "New Wozzeck"
- 1981 National Endowment for the Humanities, Summer Seminar Grant
- 1981 New York State Council on the Arts, Visual Arts Grant
- 1979-85 Committee for the Visual Arts, Artists Space Grant
- 1980-85 The Media Bureau of The Kitchen Grant
- 1976 National Endowment for the Arts, Artist Fellowship
- 1963-64 Woodrow Wilson Foundation Fellowship in Fine Arts

== Education ==
- B. A. in fine arts and languages, Brooklyn College of the City University of New York. Studied painting and printmaking with Ad Reinhardt, Kurt Seligmann, and Burgoyne Diller.
- M.A. in history of art, Institute of Fine Arts at New York University, where she studied renaissance printmaking with Colin Eisler, and was a student of Edward Laning at the Arts Students League.
- Workshops with dancers Simone Forti and Yvonne Rainer.
