= Freedom Ship: The Uncharted History of Escaping Slavery by Sea =

Book by Marcus Rediker

- Author: Marcus Rediker
- Publisher: Viking Press
- Publication date: May 13, 2025
- ISBN: 9780525558347
- OCLC: 1493517966

Freedom Ship: The Uncharted History of Escaping Slavery by Sea is a book by Marcus Rediker.

== Background ==
The book was written by Marcus Rediker and published by Viking Press on May 13, 2025. The premise of the book is that the underground railroad had its origins in ships travelling along the Atlantic coast. Rediker claims in the book that more slaves may have escaped to the north by boat than by land. The book tells the stories of abolitionists such as Jonathan Walker and William P. Powell. The book also includes stories about Frederick Douglass and Harriet Tubman.

== Reception ==
The book received a starred review from Publishers Weekly calling it a "radical reimagining of the antebellum period". A review in LibraryJournal called it a "beautifully written and compassionate" book. Shari Stauch praised the book in The Post and Courier saying that "[t]he writing is both lyrical and authoritative".
