= Peter Linebaugh =

American Marxist historian

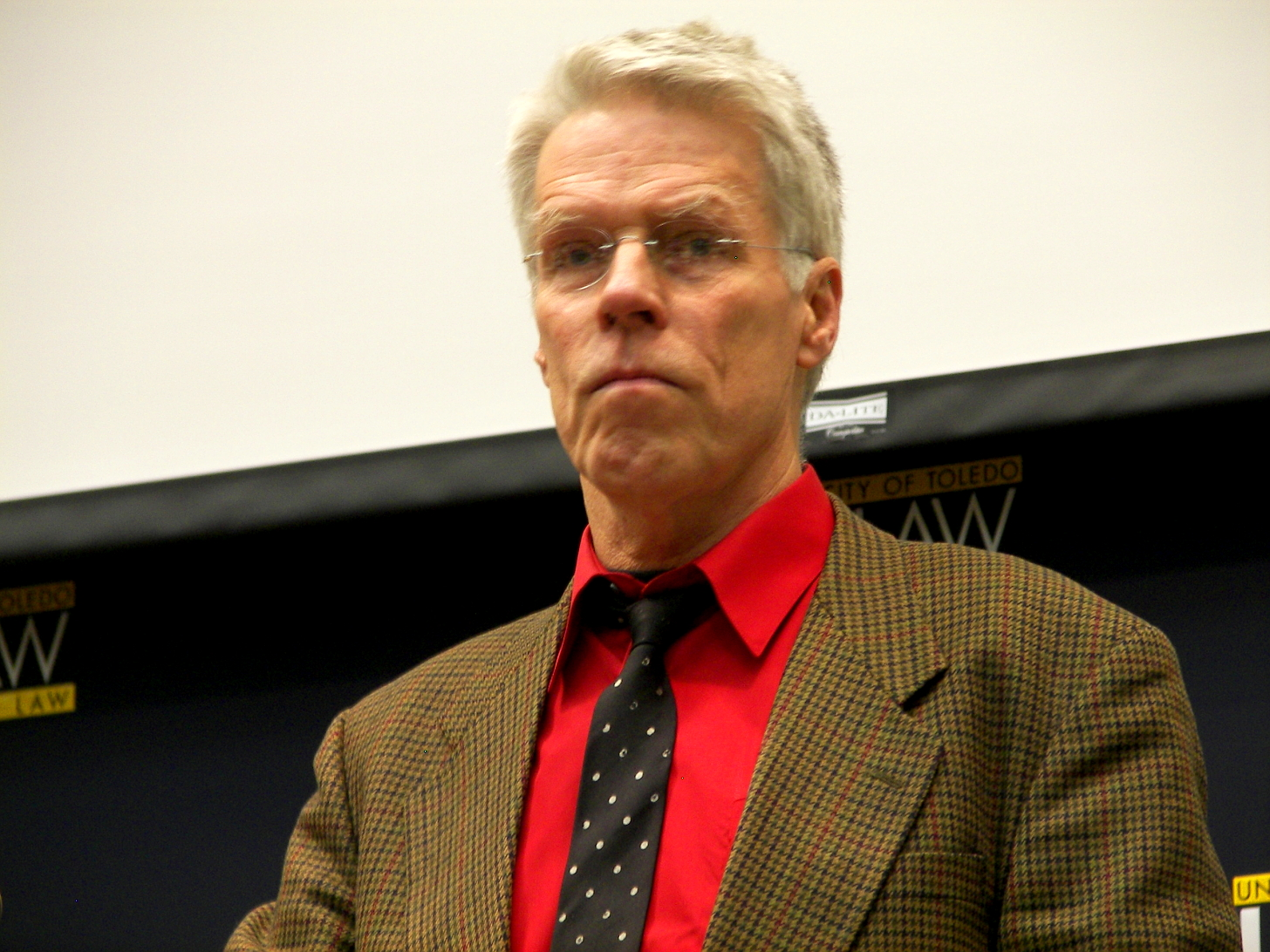
Historian Peter Linebaugh

Peter Linebaugh is an American Marxist historian who specializes in British history, Irish history, labor history, and the history of the colonial Atlantic. He is a member of the Midnight Notes Collective.

== Early life ==
Linebaugh was born in 1942. He was a student of British labor historian E. P. Thompson, and received his Ph.D. in British history from the University of Warwick in 1975. He has taught at University of Rochester, New York University, University of Massachusetts–Boston, Franconia College, Harvard University, and Tufts University. Linebaugh retired from the University of Toledo in 2014.

== Career ==
About the second edition of his book The London Hanged — and about Linebaugh's unique place in the pantheon of 21st-century historians more broadly — Nicholas Lezard wrote, "For a start, this is a work of proper history: with all due respect to Dava Sobel . . . and others who set out to make their histories entertaining and, crucially, popular by giving them a narrative, this is a work by a proper historian, whose only concession to the marketplace is the fact that he has made a connection that should command our attention." Historian Robin Kelley praised Linebaugh's book The Magna Carta Manifesto (2008), arguing that there is "not a more important historian living today. Period."

Linebaugh's writing has appeared in New Left Review, the New York University Law Review, Radical History Review, and Social History. He is also a frequent contributor to CounterPunch.

== Personal life ==
Linebaugh is married to Michaela Brennan. He has two daughters, Kate and Riley Linebaugh.

== Publications ==
- Albion's Fatal Tree: Crime and Society in Eighteenth-Century England (with Doug Hay and E. P. Thompson). Pantheon Press, 1975.
- The London Hanged: Crime and Civil Society in the Eighteenth Century. London: Allen Lane, 1991.
- The Many-Headed Hydra: Sailors, Slaves, Commoners, and the Hidden History of the Revolutionary Atlantic (with Marcus Rediker). Boston: Beacon Press, 2001.
- The Magna Carta Manifesto: Liberties and Commons for All. Berkeley: University of California Press, 2008.
- Ypsilanti Vampire May Day. Occupy Ypsilanti, 2012.
- Ned Ludd & Queen Mab: Machine-Breaking, Romanticism, and the Several Commons of 1811–12. Oakland: PM press, 2012.
- Stop, Thief! The Commons, Enclosures, and Resistance. Oakland: PM Press, 2014.
- The Incomplete, True, Authentic, and Wonderful History of May Day. Oakland: PM Press, 2016.
- Red Hot Globe Round Burning: A Tale at the Crossroads of Commons and Closure, of Love and Terror, of Race and Class, and of Kate and Ned Despard. Berkeley: University of California Press, 2019.
