= Sarah Smith Lay =

American Quaker abolitionist (18th-century)

Sarah Smith Lay, wife of abolitionist Benjamin Lay, and Quaker, was born in 1677 in Rochester, Kent, England. She was known as a well respected woman in Quaker Friends groups. According to her husband, who himself had physical disabilities which limited his height, Sarah too was similar in stature. The couple were, generally, noted to be a fine fit with one another.

Sarah Smith married Benjamin Lay in 1718. Lay had gone to America to receive a document which cleared him for marriage. He had done this because his behavior in English Quaker meeting houses would have halted his acquiring of a document for marriage. The two had to apply together to be given permission to marry which was granted the same year of their wedding. Smith and her husband then moved to Barbados in the 1720s to operate a business there.

Benjamin Lay was notoriously disruptive. Sarah Smith, on the other hand, was described as "an intelligent and pious woman" and "an approved minister of the gospel" at Friends Meetings. While it is not known if this difference caused trouble in their personal relationship, fellow Quakers struggled to understand how Sarah could put up with the radical.

== Barbados 1718–1720 ==
Upon their arrival in Barbados, the Lays opened up a merchant shop, or goods store. Benjamin Lay would later write that here the two came face to face with the abhorrent institution of slavery and the poor conditions of the enslaved people. He described them as nearly starved. Lay did say, however, that the enslaved people seemed "to love and admire us, we being pretty much alike in Stature and otherways", and "seem'd to rejoice to see us together, we were so very much alike; and would lift up their Hands with Admiration."

Sarah attempted to provide charity to the enslaved people who lingered near their shops. Some historians say the charity was rather meager, however, because she handed them the rotten or moldy food which they could spare. It did create an issue as the enslaved persons would return unannounced and take food from their store. Lay was rather angered, but understood that he was as much to blame, if not more so than them. He also describes that, upon seeing a rather gruesome scene, his "dear wife" asked him, "What is there to do?" about the issue of slavery. The couple stayed only briefly in Barbados before returning to England.

== Pennsylvania 1732–1735 ==
Sarah and Benjamin returned to England. They lived in London for some years, then in Colchester. It was in Colchester where local Quakers who held her in high regard demanded she turn over her certificate of marriage, and Lay's document which approved him to be fit for marriage. She denied, and stood by her husband despite his continued unruly behavior. In a final move, the couple found themselves settling in Pennsylvania, around Philadelphia.

Sarah Smith Lay died in 1735 and is buried in Abington, Pennsylvania.

Her husband shortly after her death wrote his book All slave-keepers that keep the innocent in bondage... in 1738. One author said of the work which Lay writes of his wife in, that "His words tell of the respect he held for her and the painful loss he felt after their social and physical separation. The sound of his words constitute an autobiographic scream."
