= The Slave Ship: A Human History =

Book by Marcus Rediker

The Slave Ship: A Human History is a book by Marcus Rediker.

== Background ==
The book focuses on the slave ship after 1700 when Britain dominated the slave trade. The book is 434 pages long and discusses the stories of the slaves as well as the sailors. The crew on slave ships were often left in the Americas because the captain didn't need them for the return journey and didn't want to pay them. The book covers the 1775 Liverpool seamen's revolt. There is a chapter focused on John Newton. Another chapter focuses on James Field Stanfield. The book draws on Olaudah Equiano's memoirs. The book draws from a database compiled by a research team led by David Eltis of Emory University.

== Reception ==
The book received a starred review in Publishers Weekly which called the book "groundbreaking work". Kirkus Reviews praised the book saying that "Rediker's dramatic presentation powerfully impresses." In 2008, the book won the George Washington Book Prize.

== Adaptations ==
A theatre play called "The Vast Machine" was created based on the book.

The audiobook version is narrated by David Drummond.
