= Benjamin Lay =

English-born writer and activist (1682–1759)

- 1750 portrait of Lay by William Williams
- Born: January 26, 1682; Copford, Essex, Kingdom of England
- Died: February 8, 1759 (aged 77); Abington, Pennsylvania
- Occupations: Sailor, merchant, and farmer
- Spouse: Sarah Smith Lay (m. 1718; died 1735)

Pennsylvania Historical Marker
- Official name: Benjamin Lay (1682–1759)
- Designated: September 22, 2018

Benjamin Lay (January 26, 1682 – February 8, 1759) was an English-born writer, farmer and activist. Born in Copford, Essex, into a Quaker family, he underwent an apprenticeship as a glovemaker before running away to London and finding work as a sailor. In 1718, Lay moved to the British colony of Barbados, which operated a plantation economy dependent on slave labour. While working as a merchant, his shock at the brutal treatment of slaves in Barbados led Lay to develop lifelong abolitionist principles, which were reinforced by his humanitarian ideals and Quaker beliefs.

Lay subsequently moved to the Province of Pennsylvania, living in Philadelphia before settling in Abington with his wife, Sarah Smith Lay, who was also a Quaker and shared his humanitarian and abolitionist beliefs. Operating a small farm, which produced fruit, flax and wool, he refused to consume any product made from slave or animal labour and lived a frugal, vegetarian lifestyle, which continued after Sarah died in 1735. A hunchback with a protruding chest, Lay was roughly four feet tall and referred to himself as "Little Benjamin".

Lay was also a prolific writer, writing books and pamphlets that advocated the abolition of slavery. His 1737 book All Slave-Keepers That Keep the Innocent in Bondage, Apostates was one of the first abolitionist works published in the Thirteen Colonies. Lay developed a hostile relationship with American Quakers, many of whom owned slaves, frequently disrupting their meetings with demonstrations to protest against slavery. Lay died in early 1759, and his anti-slavery views went on to inspire successive American abolitionists.

== Life ==
Benjamin Lay was born in 1682 to Quaker parents William and Mary Lay in Copford, near Colchester, England. After working as a farm labourer and shepherd, later as an apprentice glove-maker, Lay ran away to London and became a sailor at the age of 21. He later returned to England and had married Sarah Smith by 1718.

In 1718, Lay moved to Barbados as a merchant. Soon his abolitionist principles, fueled by his Quaker radicalism, made him unpopular with those fellow residents who profited from slavery and human trafficking. In 1731, he emigrated to the Province of Pennsylvania, settling first in Philadelphia (in what is now the Olney neighborhood), and later in Abington. In Abington, he was one of the earliest and most zealous opponents of slavery, at a time when Quakers were not yet organized in opposition to slavery. On one occasion, Lay carried an animal bladder filled with red pokeberry juice under his coat in order to stage a protest.

Standing barely four feet (1.2 metres) tall, Lay was a hunchback with a protruding chest, and his arms were as long as his legs. Referring to himself as "Little Benjamin", he also likened himself to "little David" confronting the Goliath of slavery. Lay became a vegetarian after killing a groundhog that had ravaged his garden. He had nailed its body parts to the corners of his garden. He felt remorse over the incident and, after reading the works of Thomas Tryon, declared himself a vegetarian and recommended a quiet, rural life based on "harmony and unity" with the world. Lay came to view a divine pantheistic presence of God in all living things; he opposed the death penalty in all instances.

As a vegetarian, Lay ate fruits, honey and vegetables, and drank only milk and water. He planted apple, peach and walnut trees and managed a large apiary. Honey was a staple of his diet; he never killed the bees. He also grew potatoes, radishes and squash. His favourite meal was "turnips boiled, and afterwards roasted".

Lay created his own clothes to boycott all commodities produced by the exploitation of others, including animals. He refused to use the wool of sheep and wore only flax-made garments. Refusing to participate in what he described in his tracts as a degraded, hypocritical, tyrannical, and even demonic society, Lay was committed to a lifestyle of almost complete self-sustenance after his beloved wife died. Dwelling in the Pennsylvania countryside in a cave with outside entryway attached, Lay farmed fruit trees and spun the flax he grew into clothing for himself. Inside the cave he stowed his library: two hundred books of theology, biography, history and poetry.

He published more than 200 pamphlets, most of which were impassioned polemics against various social institutions of the time, particularly slavery, capital punishment, the prison system, and the wealthy Pennsylvania Quaker elite.

== Abolitionism ==
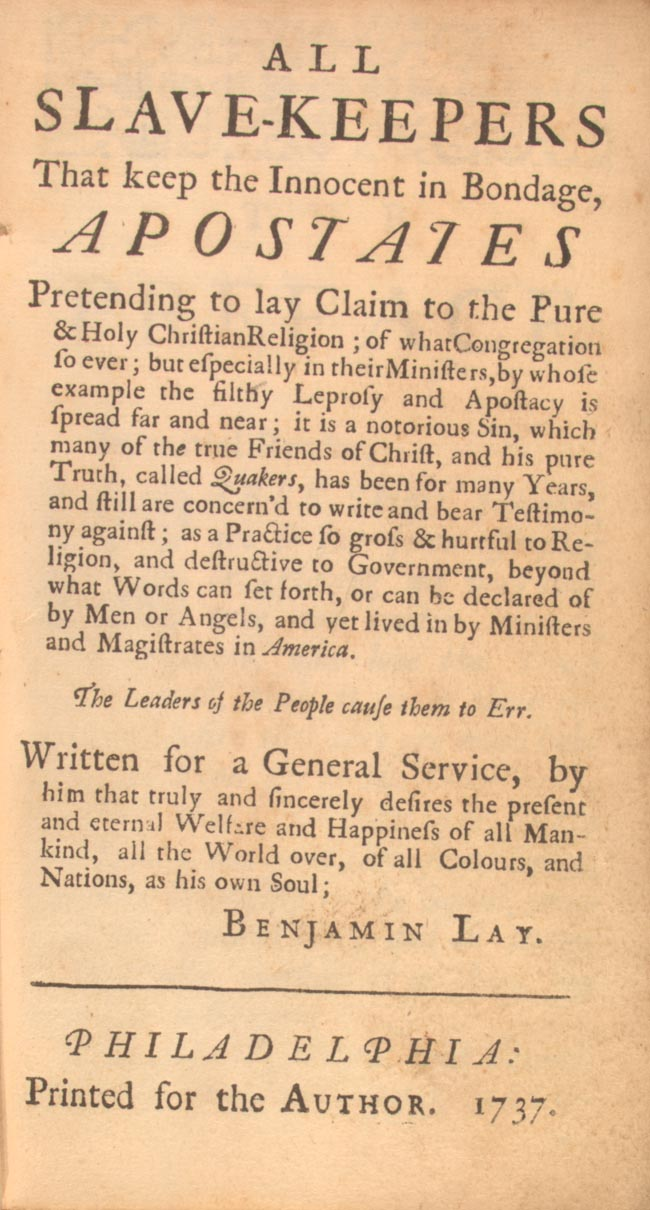
Condemnation of slavery by Benjamin Lay, 1737

Lay first began advocating for the abolition of slavery when, in Barbados, he saw an enslaved man commit suicide rather than be hit again by his owner. His passionate enmity of slavery was partially fueled by his Quaker beliefs. Lay made several dramatic demonstrations against the practice. He once stood outside a Quaker meeting in winter wearing no coat and at least one foot bare and in the snow. When a passer-by expressed concern for his health, he said that slaves were made to work outdoors in winter dressed as he was. On another occasion, he kidnapped the child of slaveholders temporarily, to show them how Africans felt when their relatives were sold overseas.

In 1738, Lay attended the Philadelphia Yearly Meeting of Quakers in Burlington, New Jersey. Dressed as a soldier, he delivered a diatribe against slavery, invoking the Bible, saying that all men should be equal under God. He ended by plunging a sword into a Bible containing a bladder of blood-red pokeberry juice, which spattered over those nearby. "Thus shall God shed the blood of those persons who enslave their fellowcreatures," he said.

== Friendship with Benjamin Franklin ==
Benjamin Franklin had printed Lay's book All Slave Keepers That keep the Innocent in Bondage, Apostates, a polemic against slavery, and sold it for two shillings a copy, twenty shillings a dozen. He regularly visited in Lay's later years, after Lay had become a hermit. At the time, Franklin had enslaved a person by the name of Joseph and by 1750 had also enslaved two persons, Peter and Jemima. Lay pressed him for his justification: "With What Right?" In April 1757, Franklin drafted his new will in which he promised Peter and Jemima that they would be freed after his death.

As a gift to her husband, Franklin's wife, Deborah Read, commissioned William Williams to paint a portrait of Benjamin Lay (portrayed above). This portrait was known in the 18th century but disappeared until it was sold at auction in 1977 for four dollars, restored by conservators at the Winterthur Museum and subsequently sold to the National Portrait Gallery in Washington, DC.

== Death and legacy ==
Benjamin Lay died in Abington, Pennsylvania, in 1759. His legacy continued to inspire the abolitionist movement for generations; throughout the early and mid-19th century, it was common for abolitionist Quakers to keep pictures of Lay in their homes. Benjamin Lay was buried in Abington Friends Meeting's burial ground in a grave whose exact location is unknown, but next to the meeting house and adjacent to Abington Friends School in Jenkintown, Pennsylvania. In 2012, during the brief Occupy Jenkintown encampment, protesters symbolically rechristened the Jenkintown Town Square as "Benjamin Lay Plaza".

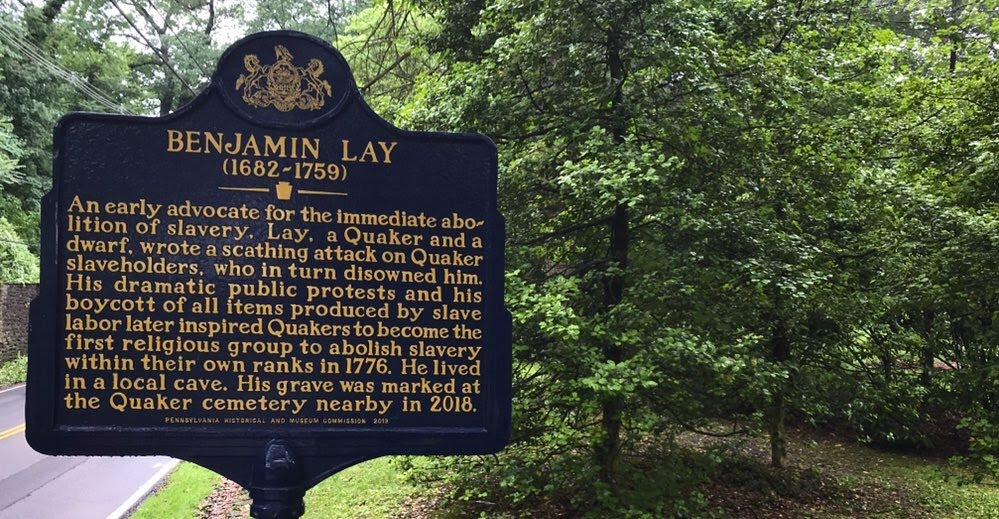
Historical marker for Benjamin Lay placed by the Pennsylvania Historical and Museum Commission near the Abington Friends meetinghouse.

In 2018, the Pennsylvania Historical and Museum Commission erected a historical marker in Abington commemorating Lay. On April 21, 2018, Abington Friends Meeting unveiled a grave marker for Benjamin and Sarah Lay in its graveyard.

Four Quaker meetings disowned Lay for his inconvenient campaigning. In 2018, Southern East Anglia Area Meeting, part of Britain Yearly Meeting, became the last of the four to "undisown" him. The others were Abington Monthly Meeting and Philadelphia Yearly Meeting in the US and North London Area Meeting in Britain.

The Benjamin Lay room at Friends House, London, UK, is named after him.

The Fearless Benjamin Lay: The Quaker Dwarf Who Became the First Revolutionary Abolitionist is a book about Lay written by Marcus Rediker and published by Verso Books on September 1, 2017. The Return of Benjamin Lay, a play by Naomi Wallace and Rediker, starring Mark Povinelli, opened in London in 2023. The production premiered in the U.S. with the Quantum Theatre in January 2025, and was subsequently mounted in Philadelphia in May 2025. The 2026 documentary film Becoming Benjamin Lay, directed by Tony Buba and produced by Rediker, follows the journey of actor Mark Povinelli in adapting the one-person show for a performance before the Little People of America conference in Baltimore in 2024.

Lay serves as inspiration for DJ Quakes in Harriet Tubman: Live in Concert, a fiction book written by Bob the Drag Queen.

== Selected publications ==
- Book: All Slave-Keepers That Keep the Innocent in Bondage, Apostates. Philadelphia: Benjamin Franklin. 1737.

== See also ==
- Thomas Tryon, one of Benjamin Lay's influences; in the Williams painting, Lay is holding a copy of one of Tryon's works
- List of abolitionist forerunners
