= Dan Georgakas =

American anarchist poet and historian (1938–2021)

- Born: March 1, 1938; Detroit, Michigan, US
- Died: November 23, 2021 (aged 83)
- Movement: Anarchism, Revolutionary syndicalism

Dan Georgakas (Greek: Νταν Γεωργακάς; March 1, 1938 – November 23, 2021) was an American anarchist poet and historian, who specialized in oral history and the American labor movement, best known for the publication Detroit: I do mind dying: A study in urban revolution (1975), which documents African-American radical groups in Detroit during the 1960s and 1970s.

== Early life ==
Dan Georgakas was born March 1, 1938, to Xenophon and Sophia Georgakas in Detroit, Michigan.

== Career ==
In 1966, Georgakas and painter Ben Morea helped found the anarchist group Up Against the Wall Motherfucker affiliated with New York City's Lower East Side.

In 1967, he signed the "Writers and Editors War Tax Protest," initiated by an editor of the New York Times magazine. Inspired by the civil disobedience of Henry David Thoreau, the manifesto united 528 American writers and publishers who refused to pay the 10% tax for the Vietnam War.

In 1975, Georgakas co-published with Marvin Surkin Detroit: I do mind dying: a study in urban revolution. The book traces workers' struggles of the 1970s in the car factories. It highlights: conditions of line work, corruption of union apparatus, daily racism in American society.

In the late 1980s, Georgakas began co-writing the Encyclopedia of the American Left (1990, 1998) with Mari Jo Buhle and husband Paul Buhle.

Georgakas had spoken at annual seminars for the International Brotherhood of Electrical Workers (IBEW).

Georgakas had long served on the editorial board of Cinéaste magazine and specializes in Latin American cinema.

Georgakas had taught at New York University, Columbia University, the University of Oklahoma, the University of Massachusetts Amherst, and Queens College.

Before his death, Georgakas had been serving as director of the Greek American Studies Project of the Center for Byzantine and Modern Greek Studies; he also specialized in Latin American cinema.

== Legacy ==
In 1967, Georgakas and Surkin helped coin the term "New Detroit".

Georgakas has left the bulk of his papers to the Walter P. Reuther Library, Archives of Labor and Urban Affairs at Wayne State University, with writings on cinema in the Tamiment Library of New York University.

== Works ==
Written: Georgakas' written works include:

- Richard Trevellick and the labor reformers (1960?)
- "The Black Jacobins in Detroit" (chapter) (1963)
- Romiossini The Story of the Greeks, with Giannēs Ritsos
- "Conversation over Tea" in Phylon (1963)
- Michigan labor and the Civil War, with Albert A Blum (1965?)
- Manifesto for the grey generation, with Friederike Poessnecker and Carl Weissner (1966)
- "And All Living Things Their Children" (1968) Poetry published by Screeches Press, UK
- Detroit: I do mind dying: a study in urban revolution, with Marvin Surkin (1975)
- "Dark Odyssey" in Senses of Cinema (1980)
- The Methuselah Factors: Strategies for a Long and Vigorous Life (1980)
- Encyclopedia of the American Left, with Mari Jo Buhle and Paul Buhle (1990, 1998)
- "The Films of Theo Angelopoulos" in Journal of Modern Greek Studies (2000)
- "Stella Michael Cacoyannis, Greece 1955" in The Cinema of the Balkans, London and New York (2006)
- My Detroit: Growing Up Greek and American in Motor City (2006)
- "HUAC and the Red Trilogy of World War II: The North Star, Mission to Moscow, Ballad of Russia" in New Politics (2013)
- "Radical America" in New Politicas (2018)
- "This week in history: Radical feminist Voltairine de Cleyre" in People's World (2016)

Film: Georgakas' has appeared in documentaries, including:

- Detroit: Run of a City (2005)
- I'm Standin' Over Here Now (2013)
- Dan Georgakas: A Diaspora Rebel (2015)
