= Mari Jo Buhle =

American historian (born 1943)

- Born: Mari Jo Kupski; 1943 (age 82–83)
- Title: William J. Kenan Jr. University Professor Emerita
- Spouse: Paul Buhle (m. 1963)
- Awards: MacArthur Fellowship

Academic background
- Education: University of Connecticut
- Alma mater: University of Wisconsin-Madison

Academic work
- Discipline: History
- Institutions: Brown University
- Notable works: Encyclopedia of the American Left

Mari Jo Buhle (born 1943) is an American historian and William J. Kenan Jr. University Professor Emerita at Brown University.

== Early life and education ==
Buhle was born in 1943 as Mari Jo Kupski. She graduated from North Chicago Community High School in 1961.

Listed as Mari Jo Kupski Buhle in 1968, she received her Master of Arts degree in history from the University of Connecticut. She earned a doctorate from the University of Wisconsin-Madison in 1974.

== Career ==
She served on the faculty of Brown University from 1972 until her retirement in 2009, where she was the first member of the faculty to hold a position dedicated to women's studies. She taught mainly on the history of American women, training students at the undergraduate and graduate levels in both the American Civilization and History departments. Buhle's own research began with a specialty in the history of American radicalism and expanded to include the history of the behavior sciences in the United States. Buhle has received fellowships from the Center for Research on Women at Wellesley College; the Bunting Institute (now the Radcliffe Institute) at Harvard University; and the John D. and Catherine T. MacArthur Foundation (1991–1996).

Since the 1980s, Buhle, her husband Paul, and Dan Georgakas have been co-writing and publishing Encyclopedia of the American Left, first published in 1990.

In 1991, Buhle was named a MacArthur Fellow.

== Personal life ==
On December 30, 1963, she married Paul Buhle.

== Legacy ==
Buhle's papers (1971 to 2008) are held at Smith College.

== Works ==
- It Started in Wisconsin: Dispatches from the Front Lines of the New Labor Protest, (Verso, 2012, ISBN 978-1-84467-888-4
- The concise history of woman suffrage, eds. Mari Jo Buhle and Paul Buhle (University of Illinois Press, 2005), ISBN 978-0-252-07276-5
- Out of Many, Volume 1: A History of the American People, John Mack Faragher, Mari Jo Buhle, Susan Armitage, Daniel Czitrom (Prentice Hall, 2005), ISBN 978-0-13-195129-7
- Feminism and Its Discontents: A Century of Struggle with Psychoanalysis (Harvard University Press, 2000), ISBN 978-0-674-00403-0
- The American radical, eds. Mari Jo Buhle, Paul Buhle, Harvey J. Kaye (Routledge, 1994), ISBN 978-0-415-90804-7
- Encyclopedia of the American Left, Mari Jo Buhle, Paul Buhle, Dan Georgakas (Garland Pub., 1990), ISBN 978-0-8240-3713-0
- Women and American Socialism, 1870-1920 (University of Illinois Press, 1983), ISBN 978-0-252-01045-3
