= Angry Arts Week =

1967 event in New York City

Angry Arts Week was an event organised by a group of radical artists based in Lower East Side, New York City in January 1967. It brought together such people as Michael Brown of the Pageant Players, Peter Schumann from the Bread and Puppet Theatre Osha Neumann, performance artist Carolee Schneemann, and the painter Ben Morea. They were particularly active opposing the Vietnam War.
