= Paul Buhle =

American historian (born 1944)

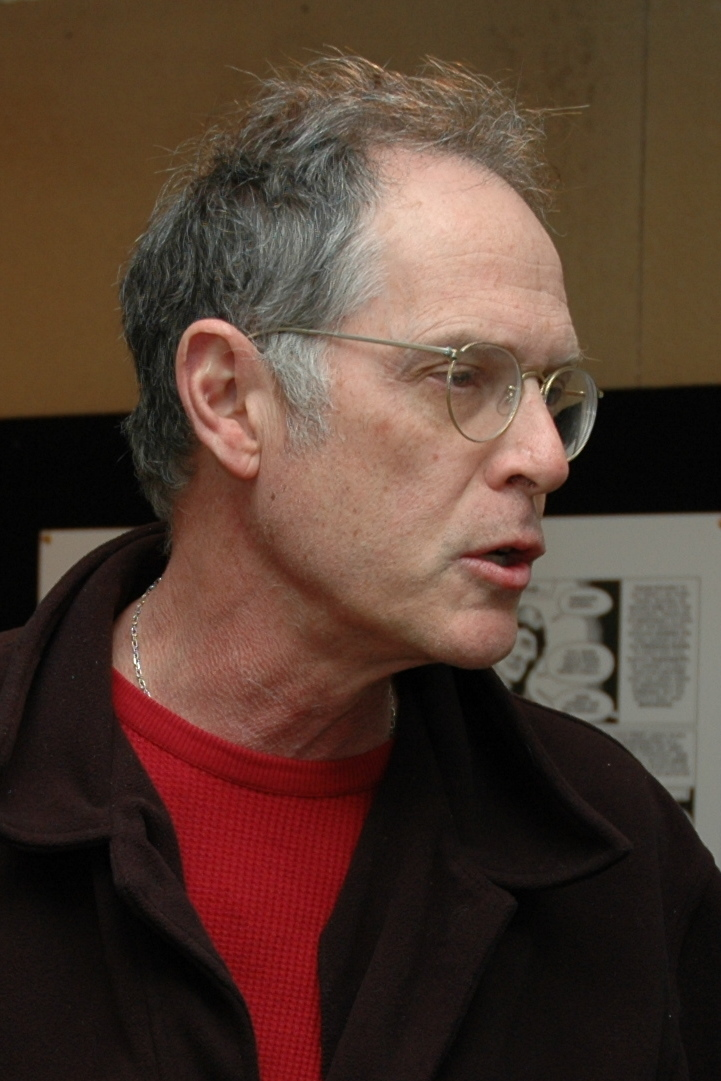
- Buhle in Providence (2007)
- Born: Paul Merlyn Buhle; September 27, 1944 (age 81); Champaign, Illinois, U.S.
- Education: University of Illinois; University of Connecticut; University of Wisconsin–Madison
- Spouse: Mari Jo Buhle (m. 1963)
- Writing career
- Notable work: C. L. R. James: The Artist as Revolutionary (1988)

Paul Merlyn Buhle (born September 27, 1944) is an American historian, who is (retired) Senior Lecturer at Brown University, author or editor of 35 volumes, including histories of radicalism in the United States and the Caribbean, studies of popular culture, and a series of nonfiction comic art volumes. He is the authorized biographer of C. L. R. James.

== Biography ==
Buhle was born in Champaign, Illinois, on September 27, 1944. His mother was a registered nurse with the maiden name of Pearle Drake. His father, Merlyn Buhle, was a geologist. On December 30, 1963, Paul Buhle married Mari Jo Kupski, who later earned a doctorate in history and co-authored several works with Buhle.

Buhle graduated in 1966 from the University of Illinois, where he had been a spokesperson for the chapter of Students for a Democratic Society's antiwar activities. He received a master's degree from the University of Connecticut (in 1967) and a Ph.D. from the University of Wisconsin–Madison (in 1975). He had been active in the civil rights movement in SDS, and a member for some months of the Socialist Labor Party. In 2006–07, he was one of the founding figures of the new Students for a Democratic Society, and more recently a leader of the Movement for a Democratic Society.

Buhle was founding editor of the journal Radical America (1967–1999), an unofficial organ of Students for a Democratic Society, founder of Cultural Correspondence (1977–83), a journal of popular culture studies, and founder and director of the Oral History of the American Left archive at New York University in 1976.

In Rhode Island, he co-founded the Rhode Island Labor History Society, was active in labor history and labor support activities and produced several popular histories of the state's labor movement. He also produced Vanishing Rhode Island, a pictorial history and plea for preservation; and with his students, Underground Rhode Island. He has contributed frequently to the journals and newspapers The Nation, The Village Voice, Monthly Review, Jewish Currents, The Chronicle of Higher Education and The San Francisco Chronicle.

External videos
- Interview with Buhle on Bohemians: A Graphic History, June 7, 2014, C-SPAN

Buhle is the co-author of four books on the history of the Hollywood Blacklist, and the editor of a series of graphic non-fiction works by American comics artists and writers, among them Harvey Pekar, Sabrina Jones and Sharon Rudahl.

He is a member of the Democratic Socialists of America.

== Career ==
Buhle taught at the Cambridge-Godard Graduate School, 1971–73, and lectured at the Rhode Island School of Design until accepting an appointment as lecturer in History and American Civilization at Brown University in 1995. In 1982–83, he created an oral history collection at the Tamiment Library, New York University, the Oral History of the American Left Collection, with associated research on ethnic radicalism.

Buhle has served on the Board of The Minnesota Review, as Contributing Editor to Tikkun, and on the editorial advisory board on Radical Americas (an on-line publication of MDS). He has also been a sponsor of New Politics and an adviser on documentary biographies of Howard Zinn, comic artist Will Eisner, and Sacco and Vanzetti, and in the 1980s served as historian for the radio series Grandma was an Activist.

Buhle is the editor/creator of radical graphic books, including The Young C.L.R. James: A Graphic Novelette and A Full Life: James Connolly the Irish Rebel.

== Selected bibliography ==
Books:

- Author, Marxism in the United States (1987)
- Author, C. L. R. James: The Artist as Revolutionary (1988)
- Editor, History and the New Left: Madison, Wisconsin, 1950–1970 (1990)
- Co-author, The Tragedy of Empire: A biography of William Appleman Williams (1995)
- Co-editor, Encyclopedia of the American Left (1990, 1998), with Mari Jo Buhle and Dan Georgakas
- Co-author, A Very Dangerous Citizen, Abraham Lincoln Polonsky and the Hollywood Left (1999)
- Co-author, Radical Hollywood (2001)
- Co-author, Hide in Plain Sight, the Blacklistees in Film and Television, 1950–2002 (2003)
- Co-editor, The New Left Revisited (2004)
- Co-editor, Wobblies! A Graphic History of the Industrial Workers of the World (2005)
- Author, Tim Hector, Caribbean Radical (2006)
- Editor, Jews and American Popular Culture, 3 volumes (2007)
- Editor, Che Guevara, a Graphic Biography (2008)
- Co-author, with Howard Zinn and Mike Konopacki of A People's History of American Empire (2008),
- Co-editor, Yiddishkeit: Jewish Vernacular & the New Land (2011)
- Editor, Radical Jesus: A Graphic History of Faith (2013)
- Co-editor, Herbert Marcuse, Philosopher of Utopia (City Lights, 2019)
- Co-editor, with Marcus Rediker and David Lester Prophet Against Slavery (2021)

Articles:

- " E. P. Thompson and his Critics ". Telos 49 (Fall 1981). New York: Telos Press
- "The Left and the Class Struggle", Monthly Review 72 (7) 2020.: 57–63.

== See also ==
- Mari Jo Buhle
- Dan Georgakas
