= Black and White and Dead All Over =

- Directed by: Chris Foster
- Produced by: Lenny Feinberg
- Starring: Wendy Ruderman, Barbara Laker, Bob Woodward, David Carr
- Production company: MAJ Productions
- Release date: June 20, 2013 (San Antonio Film Festival)
- Running time: 84 minutes
- Country: United States
- Language: English

Black and White and Dead All Over is a 2013 documentary film directed by Chris Foster. The film investigates the demise of American print journalism by following Barbara Laker and Wendy Ruderman, journalists for the Philadelphia Daily News newspaper. It also interviews other highly regarded journalists.

The film was an Official Selection of the San Antonio Film Festival and the DC Labor Film Festival, and was also chosen for a select screening at Washington D.C.’s Newseum. In December 2013, it was picked up by PBS for distribution to several television affiliates nationwide.

== Synopsis ==
Black and White and Dead All Over portrays the struggles of American newspapers to maintain circulation and editorial quality in the early 21st century. It primarily focuses on hardships within the Philadelphia Daily News, a 90-year-old newspaper that has undergone numerous ownership changes and bankruptcy proceedings in the past decade.

The film showcases the work of Laker and Ruderman, investigative reporters for the paper, as they work their beats in low-income North Philadelphia neighborhoods. Through on-camera interviews with other Philadelphia journalism leaders and review of media coverage of the paper’s numerous changes in ownership, the film paints a picture in which shoe-leather reporting is devalued in the quest for corporate profits.

To expand the discussion nationally, the film features interviews with notable journalists Bob Woodward, Charles Lewis, and David Carr.

== Creative team ==
The film was produced by the Philadelphia-based documentary film company MAJ Productions. Lenny Feinberg, president of MAJ Productions, served as lead producer for the film, with Chris Foster as director.

== Reception and Media Coverage ==
Following its 2013 release, the film received mostly positive reviews, with The Daily Beast’s Lloyd Grove stating, “At its most original, Black and White and Dead All Over presents a compelling psychological study of investigative reporters.”

TechnologyTell’s Stephen Silver added that the film was, “At its best when telling the specific stories about what has happened with the Philadelphia papers,” but added that he was “less impressed by the film’s overall take on the industry’s woes.”

The film was criticized in Philadelphia magazine by Larry Platt, a former editor of the Daily News. Platt was portrayed negatively in the film as directing resources away from the paper's investigative journalism efforts, and he defended those decisions in Philadelphia. Platt repeatedly criticized the film's producer, Lenny Feinberg, writing, “Time and again throughout Black & White, Feinberg thinks he’s revealing one thing, when he’s actually modeling industry-wide denial and allergy to change.”

Renowned Philadelphia journalist and broadcaster Larry Kane discussed the film with Feinberg, Foster, and Laker on his cable television show, Voice of Reason.
