= You Can't Be Neutral On a Moving Train =

You Can't Be Neutral on a Moving Train can refer to:

- You Can't Be Neutral on a Moving Train, Howard Zinn's autobiography book
  - Howard Zinn: You Can't Be Neutral on a Moving Train, 2004 documentary based on the book
- "You Can't Be Neutral On a Moving Train", a song from the album God of the Serengeti by Vinnie Paz
