= Corrinne Mudd Brooks =

American activist

- Born: December 14, 1914; Louisville, Kentucky
- Died: August 5, 2008 (aged 93); Fort Wayne, Indiana
- Education: Indiana University
- Parent(s): James Mudd and Bessie Loretta Douglas

Corrinne Mudd Brooks (December 14, 1914 – August 5, 2008) was an American activist who organized the first African-American Girl Scout troop in Fort Wayne, Indiana.

== Personal life and death ==
Corrinne Mudd Brooks was born Corinne Mudd in Louisville, Kentucky, on December 14, 1914, to James Mudd, born in Springfield, KY and Bessie Loretta Douglas, born in Fort Wayne, IN. The Mudd family soon moved from Kentucky to Fort Wayne, Indiana in 1915. After living in Fort Wayne, for thirteen years, Mudd Brooks mother died in 1928 of unreported causes. Mudd Brooks became the mother figure for her six siblings. Though her mother's death made an impact on her, she still excelled in school, including as an athlete. She was one of the first girls in her high school, Central High School, to receive a sweater for her participation in basketball and soccer. In 1933, she graduated from Central High School and then attended Indiana University, thanks to the award of a Civil Men's Scholarships. Sometime after leaving college she married James. W. Brooks. On August 5, at the age of 93, Corrinne Mudd Brooks died in Fort Wayne.

== Family history ==
Mudd Brooks’ Kentucky roots can be traced back all the way back to 1845. Her family line is linked to enslaved people born near Calvary, Kentucky. Her family considered themselves Catholics because of the baptism of an enslaved ancestor into that faith. Most of Corrine's father's family came from north of Calvary in an area near Springfield, Kentucky. One important member of the Mudd family that lived in Springfield was her grandfather, George Mudd, fought as a member of the Union Colored Troops in the Civil War. Between the years 1915 -1918, the first members of the family made a move to Fort Wayne. It was there that Corrinne would grow up, start her family, and live. She would also become a very active member in both the church and community.

== Career ==
Mudd Brooks' legacy is founded on organizing the first African American troop of girl scouts in Fort Wayne, IN. She was an active member of Limberlost Scout Council and served on the board of the organization. In addition, she was an active member of several other organizations, including the Commission on the Status of Women for the State of Indiana and the YWCA. She was employed as a secretary at the Fort Wayne Jewish Federations, Inc. for 27 years.

=== Member of ===
- Limberlost Girl Scout Council
- Urban league
- Commission on the Status of Woman for the State of Indiana
- YMCA
- Jewish Federation, Inc

=== Civil rights ===
Corrinne Mudd Brooks' commitment to helping her community contributed to the civil rights movement. Her contributions are best seen through her acts of service. Throughout her life she would find herself participating in many community driven events and organizations. Corrinne's efforts helped young black girls find community and learn leadership, young black students get to college and helped the greater population register to vote.

Brooks was involved and become an active member of community societies by having memberships with many different organizations. In 1930, her life of service began at the age of 16. It was then she became involved with the Phyllis Wheatley Center where she would find work on the Girls Work Committee. While she was working on the committee she would help young African Americans, who needed and wanted help get on the right path for college. This action to help young students get to college is seen again later in her life when she would later go on to serve as a member of the Ultra Arts Committee. It is there, she and others would help raise money for scholarships for those who wanted to study the arts in college.

After a study done in 1948 by the Urban League, the Phyllis Wheatley Center leadership realized that they would have to change their focus and programming. It was on October 1, 1949, that the Phyllis Wheatley Center disbanded as an organization. The center then became known officially as the Fort Wayne Urban League. The newly named organization from then on was focused around issues surrounding housing, employment, community, and race relations. It was sometime during this period that Corrinne Brooks Mudd would serve as the vice president and secretary on their board. She even helped found the Fort Wayne's Urban League Guild that still runs to this day.

While being a major help within the Fort Wayne community Corrine was also a political activist. Corrinne ran as a candidate for the State's House of Representatives in both the 1954 and 1956 election, however, she was unsuccessful in both elections. Regardless of the lack of success of each of those campaigns, she would then go forward to coordinate the Indianan voter registration drive in preparation of the 1960 presidential election. Due to her actions of going out registering over 40,000 people to voter, she was recognized by Senator, at the time, John F. Kennedy, who then invited her to a National Conference on Constitutional Rights and American Freedom.

== Legacy and honorable mentions ==
Corrine Mudd Brooks has a service award in her honor, named the Corrine Mudd Brooks Service Award for commitment to youth & community by the African/African American Historical Society.
