= The Southern Mystique =

- Author: Howard Zinn
- Publisher: Alfred A. Knopf
- Publication date: 1964
- Publication place: United States
- ISBN: 9781608463060

The Southern Mystique is a 1964 book by Howard Zinn that critiques (at the time) current conceptions of racism in the North and South and the capacity for change in race relations. The book provoked considerable discussion at time of publication.

== Content ==
Zinn presents his book as a questioning of what he sees as major myths in the understanding of Southern history, Southern culture, and possibilities for the future of race relations. Zinn begins his book by highlighting the continuing cruelty of Southern racism, especially in the continuation of the concept of biological differences between races. To demonstrate the possibility of massive future changes, Zinn puts aside historical tools of analysis in favor of the then-popular 'situational psychology' framework. This set of ideas emphasizes the mutability of human behavior, especially in comparison to the ideas of unconscious reaction supported by Freudian psychology.

In the case of the South, Zinn uses this framework to argue against an intrinsic, unassailable divide between black and white Southerners. Further, Zinn questions the idea that the racism in the North and South were unbridgeably different, arguing instead that the difference was in degree, rather than kind—the North was simply a little less racist. Finally, Zinn disposes of the question of whether differences between races were environmentally, biologically, or culturally produced. Zinn argues that the antidote to racism is "massive contact" between the black and white populations, far beyond anything that had occurred in the North.

The Southern Mystique was in large part a rearrangement of Zinn's previous writings, with only fifty of the book's 270 pages being entirely new.

== Reception ==
Martin Duberman describes how Zinn's book was received following publication in his biography Howard Zinn: A Life on the Left. Duberman notes that overall coverage was positive, with reviews by lower-tier figures in shorter reviews presenting favourable commentary. He highlights, however, three national intellectuals who lobbed long, critical reviews at the book: Lillian Smith, C. Vann Woodward, and Ralph Ellison.

Smith was the most dismissive of the three, characterizing Zinn's handling of the complexities of Southern life as "shallow," his argumentation lacking "a variety of facts" to argue his major claims, and his minimization of the past's significance as "greatly mistaken." A significant failure, Smith argued, was Zinn's argument that Northern and Southern racism was the same.

Though Woodward granted that he had never encountered "so genial and disarming a critic" as Zinn, Woodward extended Smith's central critiques with added intricacies. Like Smith, Woodward criticized how Zinn failed to describe any of the South's special historical experiences compared to the North, including slavery, secession, and Reconstruction. Again like Smith, Woodward questioned Zinn's minimization view of historians' "overly heavy sense of history." Further, Woodward questioned Zinn's dismissal of Freudian psychology. Though Woodward agreed that South's culture had the capacity for change and indeed had changed over the last decades, he argued that there was little evidence that Zinn's idea of massive integration could succeed.

Ellison said that "One needn't agree with Zinn, but one cannot afford not to hear him out... we must read him with the finest of our attention." And indeed Ellison did not agree with Zinn. In addition to supporting Smith and Woodwards' complaints, though with less severity, Ellison critiqued Zinn's orientation towards "causation" and towards racism itself. By ignoring the "encumbrances of the past," Ellison argues that Zinn "makes too much mystery of what, in its political aspects, is really a struggle for power." Regarding Zinn's argument that racism's greatest sin is "its perpetuation of the mystery of racial differences," Ellison highlights that segregation's impact on "individual and group alike" appear much more important.
