= SNCC: The New Abolitionists =

1964 book by Howard Zinn

- Author: Howard Zinn
- Publisher: Beacon Press
- Publication date: 1964
- Publication place: United States
- ISBN: 9781608462995
- Text: SNCC: The New Abolitionists at The Internet Archive

SNCC: The New Abolitionists is a 1964 book by historian Howard Zinn that describes the early years of the Student Nonviolent Coordinating Committee (SNCC) and their work registering Black voters in the rural American South.

== Synopsis ==
This book describes the activities of SNCC, the Student Nonviolent Coordinating Committee, in the early 1960s. Zinn details in particular the voter registration efforts by Black activists in the most recalcitrant areas of the South, as well as the federal government's failure to support their efforts. Zinn highlighted the role of civil disobedience as a countermeasure to state repression.

== Reception ==
Writing in the Harvard Crimson shortly after the book's publication in 1964, Donald E. Graham, later the CEO of The Washington Post, said that despite its "unbalanced glorification of the SNCC," the book has considerable power and merit. He highlighted the book's capacity to help "maintain your sense of urgency of civil rights problems," making concrete the harsh reality of the civil rights protests through Zinn's crafting of narrative and evocative style. In addition, Graham said that Zinn's work "stand[s] out" from other accounts because it "presents the unusual philosophy that has been born out of SNCC work," leaving behind the armchair philosophy of other works.

Writing in a 1974 review of the civil rights history corpus, George Burson Jr. described Zinn's work as "an excellent history" and as one of the very few books dealing specifically with SNCC. He noted that the book provides "valuable insights into the SNCC's radicalism."

Historian Martin Duberman discussed the book and its reception in his 2012 biography, Howard Zinn: A Life on the Left. Duberman notes that Zinn received largely positive reviews at the time of publication, and describes the book as being among Zinn's best. He writes that the book is "passionately argued, intense, and persuasive, though it has a few peripheral problems." However, he critiques the non-chronological structure of the book, which makes it difficult to know which events occur when. In addition, Duberman criticizes Zinn's style of citation, noting that Zinn doesn't always make clear whether he is using remembered quotes or precise quotes taken from audio tapes.

== Publishing details ==
Beacon Press approached Zinn in 1963, suggesting that he write a scholarly book on the NAACP. Zinn proposed that he instead write about the SNCC from his perspective as a participant. Despite a schedule allowing him little time to write, preoccupied as he was with his teaching and activism, Zinn managed to finish the book in 1964. He based it on his own personal experiences with SCNCC, including recordings of SNCC volunteers and his own recollected conversations.
