= Busted (book) =

2014 book by Wendy Ruderman

Busted: A Tale of Corruption and Betrayal in the City of Brotherly Love
- First edition
- Author: Wendy Ruderman and Barbara Laker
- Language: English
- Genre: Crime
- Published: March 11, 2014
- Publisher: HarperCollins
- Publication place: United States
- ISBN: 9780062085443

Busted: A Tale of Corruption and Betrayal in the City of Brotherly Love is a 2014 non-fiction book by Wendy Ruderman and Barbara Laker. The book details the true tale of how Ruderman and Laker, two reporters at the Philadelphia Daily News, led an investigation into police corruption in Philadelphia. This book shows the back story of the "Tainted Justice" investigation which earned the women a Pulitzer Prize in 2010 for investigative reporting.

== Plot summary ==
At the time of the investigation, the newspaper was in deep financial trouble. The company, which also owns the Philadelphia Inquirer, only had one lawyer at the time. The lawyer was bogged down with other legal proceedings and was unable to offer too much help to the women. So instead, when the city refused to give them access to search warrants, Ruderman and Laker convinced the custodian of the records on Christmas Eve to let them access the records.

== Aftermath of the investigation ==
The investigation was quite the controversy in Philadelphia. In part, that was because several police officers died in the line of duty leading up to the investigation, which made people already more sensitive to police at that time.

After the investigation trickled out through the tabloid over a few months, hundreds of drug cases in the city had been re-examined out and some were thrown out. Philadelphia police also launched a task force with the FBI, the department's Internal Affairs division and the city's Inspector General's Office, to investigate the incidents. As of May 10, five officers involved with the allegations were on desk duty and more than 15 civil suits had been filed in federal court.

Federal and local prosecutors decided not to press any charges against the four officers who were accused of lying about evidence on search warrants and stealing from corner drug stores—one of the officers was accused of sexually assaulting at least three women.

In July 2014, the president of Philadelphia's Fraternal Order of Police, John McNesby, demanded an investigation into how Ruderman and Laker interacted with the sources used during their "Tainted Justice" investigation. According to a NewsWorks report at the time, McNesby suggested that the reporters "may have given money, paid utility bills and provided diapers to sources who accused the offers at the center of the 2009 series." McNesby said the Pulitzer Prize should be revoked from the women.

== Pulitzer Prize ==
A video from a staff member at the Daily News shows the two women jumping wildly up and down after learning they had won. Ruderman is seen opening a small bottle of champagne, pouring it into her tennis shoe and drinking it. She later called this a reference to "shoe leather" journalism.

== Reception ==
Rosella Elanor Lafevre praised the book in a review for the Philadelphia magazine, writing:

It's a captivating story that I tore through in two days. There are moments that inspire riotous laughter and quiet awe, and some that will make your skin crawl. It gives as much proof to the importance of hard-working reporters in a one-party town as it does the importance of chasing your dreams, even when they seem preposterous.

In the May 23, 2014, edition of the New York Times' Sunday Book Review, Charles Graeber offered this short take on the book:

This is a shoe-leather journalistic procedural set against the ticking clock of the failing newspaper industry. The book is sometimes a bit self-conscious about its buddy movie potential, but it's impossible not to root for the self-described "slime sistas" as they follow up on a series of tips about a Philly police squad that regularly robbed immigrant-owned bodegas, and a badge-wielding sexual predator known only as "the Boob Man."

The Washington Post's Melinda Henneberger compared the two women to Thelma and Louise in a story appearing in the April 2, 2014, edition of the newspaper's style section:

The new book... is the chick, noir version of All the President's Men, with a little Rocky, a little Deadline U.S.A. and a little almost anything with Rosalind Russell or Barbara Stanwyck.

Many have compared Ruderman and Laker to Bob Woodward and Carl Bernstein, the journalists behind Watergate and co-authors of All the President's Men. In a column for the Columbia Journalism review, Anna Clark draws similar parallels:

The effect is a little jarring for a co-written book, but it does have the immediacy that comes with first-person narrative, while avoiding the flattening effect of a "we" voice stretching for hundreds of pages. (For the record, Woodward and Bernstein in All The President's Men opted for a third-person narrator who knows the reporters' thoughts, a choice that comes with its own idiosyncrasies: " 'Oh god, not Bernstein,' Woodward thought ...")

== TV series ==
In June 2014, Sidney Kimmel Entertainment considered developing an hour-long, limited television series based on the book. Sex and the City's Sarah Jessica Parker was reported to be attached to the project as one of two leads. Parker spent time in Philadelphia shadowing Ruderman in preparation for the role. David Frankel, director of 2006's The Devil Wears Prada, was brought on to direct the television series along with Carla Hacken, president of production at SKE, who is supposed to produce it.
