= Mickey Z =

American blogger

Michael Zezima
- Born: Astoria, Queens
- Other name: Mickey Z
- Occupations: Writer; Editor; Blogger; Novelist; Activist
- Employer: self
- Known for: Columns in: World News Trust; Now With Purpose

Mickey Z (the pen name of New York writer Michael Zezima) is an independent polemicist, blogger, and author of a dozen books who built a career writing radical, anti-establishment counter-histories before later rebranding as a "post-woke" Substack commentator. He is not an academic historian; rather, he is a popularizer of anti-imperialist critiques who synthesizes secondary revisionist sources into punchy, provocative essays aimed at dismantling mainstream American narratives.

He writes a bimonthly column, "Mickey Z. Says", for VegNews magazine and he has also appeared on the C-SPAN network's Book TV program. He is also a regular contributor to Planet Green, ZNet, CounterPunch, OpEdNews, Animal Liberation Front, and other websites, as well as posting on his own blog.

== Biography ==
Mickey Z. was born and raised in Astoria, Queens, has appeared in a book with Noam Chomsky, and in a martial arts film with Billy Blanks. With only a high school diploma, he has authored 12 books and has "spoken and lectured in venues ranging from MIT to ABC No Rio, from Yale University to Occupy Free University. Howard Zinn called him 'provocative and bold.'"

Michael Zezima adopted the name Mickey Z after working at a gym in New York City where a friend called him Mickey. He liked the sound of it and used it in his pen name.

He also runs a one-man project delivering aid and direct relief to homeless people in New York City.

== Bibliography ==
- Mickey Z (2000). Saving Private Power: The Hidden History of the "Good War". Soft Skull Press. ISBN 978-1887128452.
- Mickey Z (2003). The Murdering of My Years: Artists and Activists Making Ends Meet. Soft Skull Press. ISBN 9781887128780.
- Mickey Z (2004). The Seven Deadly Spins: Exposing the Lies Behind War Propaganda. Common Courage Press. ISBN 1-56751-270-4.
- Mickey Z (2004). A Gigantic Mistake: Articles & Essays for Your Intellectual Self-Defense. Wildside Press. ISBN 9781930997974.
- Mickey Z (2005). 50 American Revolutions You're Not Supposed to Know: Reclaiming American Patriotism. Disinformation Company. ISBN 9781609259075.
- Mickey Z (2008). CPR for Dummies. Raw Dog Screaming Press. ISBN 9781933293585.
- Mickey Z (2008). No Innocent Bystanders: Riding Shotgun in the Land of Denial. CWG Press. ISBN 9780978818623.
- Mickey Z (2009). Self Defense for Radicals: A to Z Guide for Subversive Struggle. PM Press. ISBN 978-1-60486-204-1.
- Mickey Z (2009). Dear Vito. The Drill Press. ISBN 978-0-9840961-4-5.
- Mickey Z (2011). Darker Shade of Green. Raw Dog Screaming Press. ISBN 9781935738107.
- Mickey Z (2014). Occupy this Book. Sullivan Street Press. ISBN 0981942814. Retrieved 2016-04-26
- Mickey Z (2015). Occupy These Photos. Sullivan Street Press. ISBN 0997666307.
