= Daughter of Venus =

Play written by Howard Zinn

Daughter of Venus is a play written by historian Howard Zinn (1922-2010). The drama, which was first published in 1985, debuted at New York's Theater for the New City, directed by the author's son Jeff Zinn. It was later produced at Lucille Lortel's White Barn Theater in Westport, Connecticut. That production, also directed by Jeff Zinn, was retitled Unsafe Distances and starred Dominic Chianese in the role of Lendl.

Daughter of Venus is a family drama originally set in the context of the campaign for nuclear disarmament. After the end of the Cold War, Zinn felt the play had become outdated, but his conviction that the pervasive climate of anxiety about terrorism mirrored the concerns of earlier fears of nuclear annihilation persuaded him to make the play more topical.

In December 2008 and January 2009, Suffolk University and Boston Playwrights' Theatre produced Zinn's updated version of Daughter of Venus. A Boston Globe reviewer panned the new version for "dilut[ing] the story's specificity without making it feel current," but conceded that "the play's central concerns — personal and social ethics; the balance of obligations to ourselves, our families, and our fellow citizens; the uses and abuses of political and scientific power — remain as timely as ever."

In 2010 it was produced at Wellfleet Harbor Actors Theater (WHAT) on Cape Cod directed by Jeff Zinn, WHAT's Artistic Director. On that occasion the Boston Globe's reviewer, Louise Kennedy, referencing the earlier Boston productions said, "...that production updated the action from its original 1980s setting to the present. In doing so, it made a hash of logic and chronology and also diluted the specificity of the play’s immediate concerns — the nuclear arms race and the citizens’ movement protesting it — without really strengthening its deeper theme, the complicated relationship between personal and political acts. Now, though, Zinn the younger has restored the original script (while maintaining a few of the edits that, he says, smoothed the action), and it's remarkable how much better “Daughter of Venus’’ works in this form. In Jeff Zinn’s fluid, naturalistic staging at WHAT (on an evocatively academic-homey set by Ji-Youn Chang), the play comes across as a quick-witted and emotionally complex study of a family, and a world, in crisis." (read full review.)
