= YWCA USA =

Nonprofit organization

- Founded: February 10, 1858
- Founded at: New York City
- Purpose: Advocacy for young women’s leadership, peace, justice, human rights and sustainable development
- Headquarters: Washington, D.C.
- Location: United States
- Region served: United States
- CEO: Margaret Mitchell
- Affiliations: World YWCA
- Revenue: ▲$16.4 million (2024)
- Expenses: ▼$19 million (2024)
- Employees: 54 (2024)
- Volunteers: 19 (2024)
- Website: www.ywca.org

YWCA USA is a 501(c)(3) non-profit organization and the American division of the YWCA. It is headquartered in Washington, D.C., and focuses on women's empowerment. The organization additionally aims for the promotion of peace, justice, freedom, and dignity.

In 2024, the organization had $16.4 million in revenue, $19 million in expenses (of which $2.1 million was for executive compensation) and $79.8 million in assets. YWCA USA employed 54 staff and had 19 volunteers in 2023.

== Structure ==
YWCA is an organization with nearly 200 local associations across the United States. At YWCA's annual meeting in May 2012, a transition from the prior regional structure to a national federated structure was approved, followed by the adoption of new bylaws in November 2012.

YWCA's Local Associations are separate and independent 501(c)(3) organizations with their own Board of Directors, staffing and budget.

== History ==
YWCA USA was founded as the Young Women's Christian Association in New York City in 1858.

In 1905, the Harlem YWCA hired the first Black woman general secretary of a local YWCA branch, Eva del Vakia Bowles. Bowles joined the national association as the head of "colored programs" in 1913 and remained in that capacity until 1932. Prior to the Civil Rights Movement, some YWCA facilities were segregated or operated as separate organizations. Advocates like Helen L. Seaborg in Washington, D.C., worked successfully to mediate mergers between the segregated groups.

YWCA USA used the classic "blue triangle" logo from its foundation until 1988, when it unveiled a new logo and identity designed by the renowned graphic designer Saul Bass. This was subsequently replaced with a new logo, designed by Landor Associates, in 2004.

YWCA USA changed its corporate name from "Young Women's Christian Association of the United States of America, Inc." to "YWCA USA, Inc." in December 2015.

== YWCA of The City of New York ==
The YWCA of The City of New York, the oldest of all of the YWCAs in the United States, was founded in 1858. It is unique in that the organization is guided purely by human service-oriented programs rather than physical services. Such programs include their Early Learning Centers, Family Resource Center, Out-of-School Programs, Professional Development Programming, and Women's Employment Programming to name a few, and are still guided by the YW mission of eliminating racism and empowering women. YWCA of The City of New York services are a major component of the non-profit community in New York City.

The YWCA of The City of New York produces several fundraising events annually including the Salute to Women Leaders Luncheon, the YWCA-NYC Theatre Benefit (featuring the Broadway hit The Color Purple in 2005 and the revival of Michael Bennett's A Chorus Line in 2006).

During their annual Summer Soirée (held at the W Hotel in 2005 and Cipriani 23rd Street in 2006) they present their "W" award. This award is presented to a woman who is a visionary, an innovator, trend-setter, a woman who gives back to her community and helps those the YW serves daily: the women, girls and families of New York City. In 2005, this award was given to Marian McEvoy, and in 2006 to Star Jones-Reynolds.

== YWCA Metropolitan Chicago ==
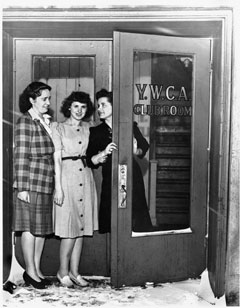
YWCA Chicago Club

YWCA Metropolitan Chicago is the oldest and largest women's organization in the region, with a mission to eliminate racism and empower women.

The Monroe Gallery at the YWCA started in 1961. Originally located at the YWCA Loop Center at 59 E. Monroe St. until 1969. It then moved to the new YWCA location 37 S. Wabash Ave. Members include Diana Solis, Diana Avila, Malu Ortega y Alberro, Salima Rivera, Eleanor Boyer, Karen Peugh, and Judith Arcana.

The Women's Video Project at the YWCA was initially created to complete video projects related to the Loop YWCA's Lay Advocacy program, provide support to other YWCA groups and individuals to use, and teach video equipment usage and guiding video projects.

Judy Hoffman made equipment recommendations early on, and by 1974 the first grant assistance had come in. At that time seven women led by video maker Eleanor Boyer went to work setting the equipment up, creating tapes, and providing support to other YWCA members. Countless tapes were made documenting workshops and lectures; workshops were given to provide hands-on experience in making small-format video, including planning, shooting, and editing; and YWCA members created their own tapes.

Boyer herself created more than a dozen tapes with the program, including Street Interviews on Rape (1974) documenting attitudes and beliefs about rape held by men and women, Getting Strong: Self Defense for Women (1976) discussing the dimensions and politics of self-defense for women, Breast Cancer Tapes (1977) opening up the subject of breast cancer from the point of view of women who had undergone treatment, and Bonne Bell: 10,000 Meter Race for Women (1978) documenting Chicago's first 6.2-mile race for women which was organized and hosted by the YWCA.

As technology shifted, the Women's Video Project at the YWCA started to seek out newer equipment that was lighter, was easier to use, and recorded in color. The members of the Video Project wrote letters of support for the newly founded and artist-run Chicago Editing Center, which later became known as the Center for New Television, and moved much of their work there.
