= Lenny Feinberg =

American film producer

Lenny Feinberg is an American movie producer, real estate investor, and owner of MAJ Productions, a documentary film production company based in Philadelphia, Pennsylvania. Feinberg has been active as a documentarian since the mid-2000s, when he executive produced his first film, The Art of the Steal.

Feinberg also produced the film Black and White and Dead All Over in 2013. In 2015, he began production on his third film, Father's Kingdom, for which he is also acting as director.

== Films ==
=== The Art of the Steal ===
Released in 2009 by MAJ Productions, The Art of the Steal is a documentary film detailing the controversial move of the Barnes Foundation, a private art collection valued at $25 billion, from Merion, Pennsylvania to Philadelphia, Pennsylvania. The film was an official selection at the Toronto International Film Festival, New York Film Festival, and AFI Film Festival, and was also picked up by IFC Films for U.S. theatrical distribution, grossing $541,027.

A student at the Barnes Foundation in his youth, Feinberg said in an interview with Bloomberg News that he believed the collection's move was part of a "nonprofit corporate takeover" by the Pew Charitable Trusts, the Annenberg Foundation, and the Lenfest Foundation. The film portrayed the nonprofits as colluding with Philadelphia and Pennsylvania public officials to wrest control of the Barnes from Lincoln University and circumvent the wishes of Albert Barnes, founder of the Barnes Foundation, whose will stated that the collection’s art was not to be moved.

In an interview with the San Francisco Chronicle, Feinberg stated that he “stewed” over the relocation of the collection and enlisted Philadelphia documentarian Dan Argott and producer Sheena Joyce to create the film over two years. Philadelphia magazine would later report that Feinberg and Argott had a falling out after the release of the film, stemming from a dispute over production credits. IMDb credits Argott as director of the film, Joyce as producer, and Feinberg as executive producer.

The film was criticized by officers of the Barnes Foundation as biased, with president Derek Gillman telling The New York Times, "It was made by people hostile to the move and ... that's why we didn't cooperate with the filmmakers."

=== Black and White and Dead All Over ===
In 2013, Feinberg partnered with director Chris Foster to create the film Black and White and Dead All Over. The documentary investigates the demise of American print journalism through interviews with a collection of Pulitzer Prize-winning journalists, and also follows bankruptcy proceedings of the Philadelphia Daily News newspaper.

The film garnered official selections at the San Antonio Film Festival and DC Labor Film Festival. It was also screened at Washington, D.C.'s Newseum and was aired on several PBS affiliates nationwide. Black and White and Dead All Over was criticized in a Philadelphia magazine op-ed by Larry Platt, a former editor of The Daily News. Platt admonished Feinberg for the film's criticisms of his efforts as editor, stating, "Time and again throughout Black & White, Feinberg thinks he's revealing one thing, when he's actually modeling industry-wide denial and allergy to change." Platt was negatively portrayed in the film. He was released from both Philadelphia Magazine and The Philadelphia Daily News.

=== Father's Kingdom ===
According to the official website of MAJ Productions, Feinberg is nearing completion on Father's Kingdom, a documentary about the Reverend M. J. Divine, a 20th-century American religious leader known as Father Divine.

Father's Kingdom had its World Premiere on November 11, 2017 in the DOC NYC Film Festival at the IFC Theater. FATHER'S KINGDOM has appeared in the following Film Festivals: DOC NYC, Big Sky Documentary FF, Maryland FF, Cleveland International FF, Dances With Films, March On Washington FF, Charlotte Black FF, San Francisco Black FF, DOCUTAH FF, Salem FF, Sarasota FF, RiverRun FF, Sidewalk FF

Father’s Kingdom became available on Stars September 1, 2019.

== Personal life ==
Feinberg was identified in the Pittsburgh Post-Gazette as living in Bryn Mawr, a census-designated place in Lower Merion Township, Pennsylvania, the municipality where the Barnes Foundation was originally located. Prior to his foray into film, Feinberg was a successful real estate investor, allowing him to bankroll the films.

Feinberg studied the Dramatic Arts at Franconia College and worked as an assistant to producer and director Otto Preminger before later being employed in the CBS Network's Research and Development Department.
