= Ron Androla =

American poet

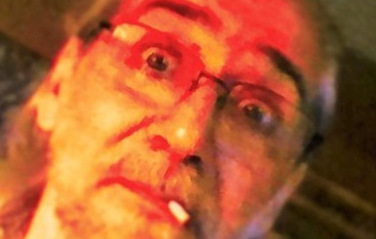
Photo of Ron Androla

Ron Androla (born August 7, 1954) is an American poet and the author of more than forty books of poetry. He has been published extensively in the American small press scene.

== Life ==
Androla was born in New Castle, Pennsylvania to a family of mixed Syrian and Italian ancestry. In the early 1970s, Androla attended Point Park College and later Franconia College, where he studied under poet Robert Grenier and came under the influence of Language poets whom he emulated at the time. However, he regards himself as part of a tradition of underground American poetry that largely rejects academic context. He considers his entry into the labor force as the true inception of his poetic vocation. For over thirty years, he worked in factories as a pressure press operator. The faces and personas of coworkers often feature in his poetry, which sketches the minutiae of working-class existence in the United States in a confessional style. Before retiring, Androla also worked as a directory assistance operator for a major telecommunications company. His writing credits continue to accumulate, spanning over half a century of publishing.

He currently resides in Erie, Pennsylvania with his wife, Ann, who is also a writer.

== Works ==
He cites the work of the Black Mountain poets as an early source of inspiration, and his work continues to show a strong influence of the Projective Verse style. His work also demonstrates the considerable influence of Charles Bukowski, especially in its disaffection and in its use of the short line, paratactical structures, colloquial enjambments and stream of consciousness technique. Like Jack Kerouac and other Beat poets, Androla prefers spontaneity and directness of experience. His poetry often explores an oneiric mental landscape which underlies everyday experience, with recurrent themes of alienation and ecstasy; its tone is most often curious and subtly bemused. He also writes vivid, imaginative short stories & flash fiction, featured in two of his recently published books.

== Partial bibliography ==
- "The Feast of Life" (2018). Pressure Press Press.
- "Vanilla, Lemon, Blood" (2017). Alien Buddha Press.
- "The Sun Spits Light" (2016). Pressure Press Press.
- "Factory Fables" (2016). Pressure Press Press.
- "After Satan" (2016). Illustrated by Jeff Filipski. Pressure Press Press.
- "Confluence" (2015). Busted Dharma Books.
- "The Water Of Mars" (2013). Pressure Press Press.
- "Maybe There Are Mathematics" (2013). Pressure Press Press.
- "Quantum Aquarium" (2012). MIPOesias.
- "What To Say To Death" (2008). GOSS183.
- "A PRESSURE PRESS COLLECTION", editor (2007). Pressure Press Press.
- Poet Head: Selected Poems 2001–2005 (2005). Rank Stranger Press.
- you know how it goes (2004). fingerprintpress.
- BONGO MOON (1998), rerelease (2004). Audio CD produced & directed by Kurt Nimmo.
