= Marx in Soho =

1999 play by Howard Zinn

Marx in Soho is a 1999 one-man play written by American historian Howard Zinn, about the life of 19th-century philosopher Karl Marx. Zinn wrote the play to "show Marx as few people knew him, as a family man, struggling to support his wife and children." The play is set in the New York City neighborhood of Soho, a humorous nod to the London neighborhood of the same name in which Marx spent much of his life.

Marx in Soho has often been produced. The play depicts Marx resurrected to defend the ideals of communism from the dehumanized version of it practiced in the former Soviet Union and to defend humanity from capitalism.

== Background ==
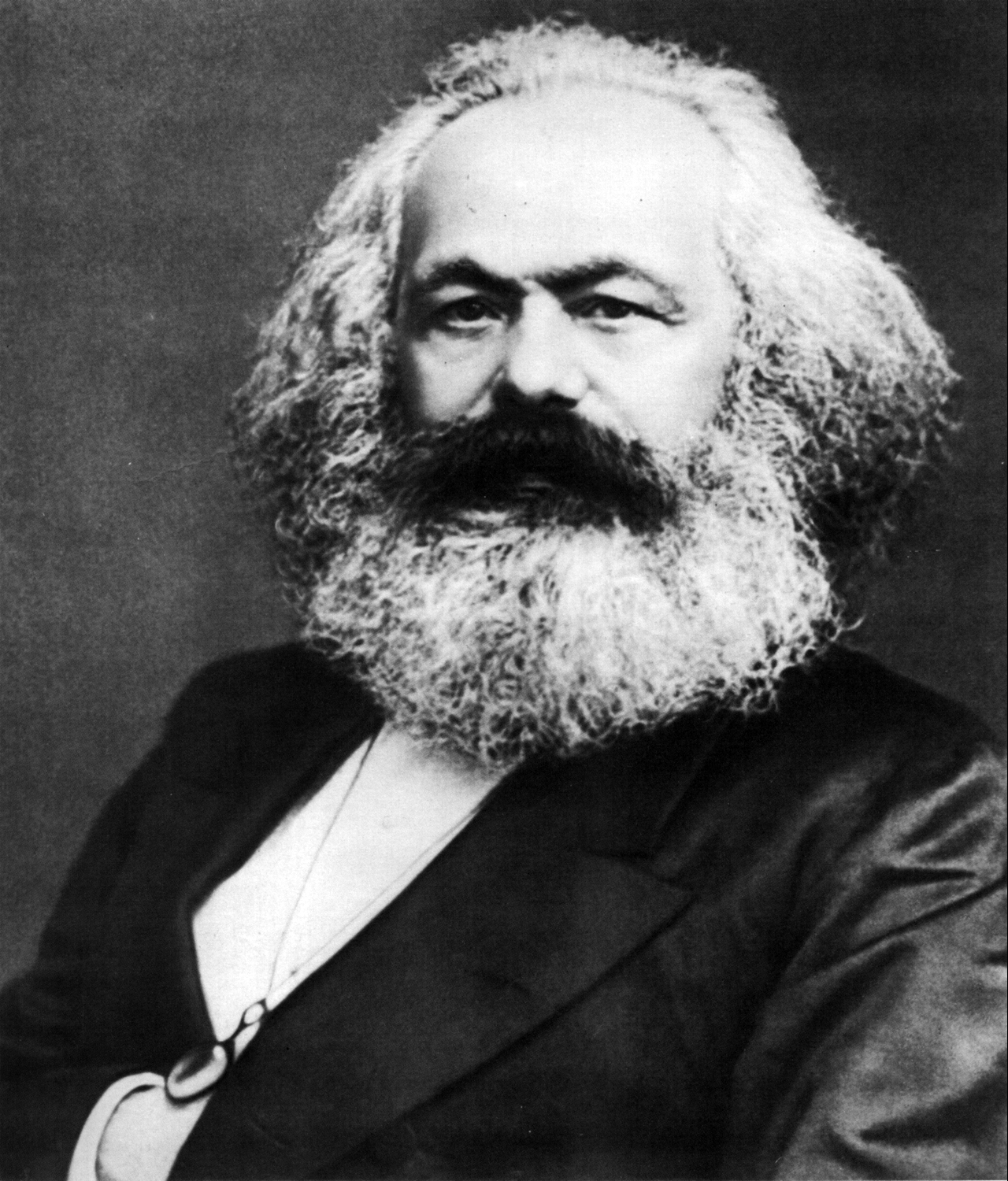
Karl Marx, the protagonist of Marx in Soho, in 1875

Zinn writes in his foreword that as early as 17, he had seen dramatic evidence "that the machinery of government was not neutral, that, despite its pretensions, it served the capitalist class.... My Communist friends brought me along with them to a demonstration in Times Square. Hundreds of people unfurled banners proclaiming opposition to war, opposition to Fascism, and marched along the street. I heard sirens. Mounted police charged the crowd. I was knocked unconscious by a plainclothes policeman. When I came to, as my head was clearing, I could only think one troubling thought: the police, the state, did the bidding of the holders of great wealth. How much freedom of speech and freedom of assembly you had depended on what class you were in."

Zinn continued: "Karl and Jenny Marx had moved to London after he was expelled from country after country on the European continent. They lived in the grubby Soho district, and revolutionaries from all over Europe, arriving in London, trooped in and out of their home. That imagined scene — Marx at home, Marx with his wife, Jenny, with his daughter Eleanor — fascinated me."

== Reviews ==
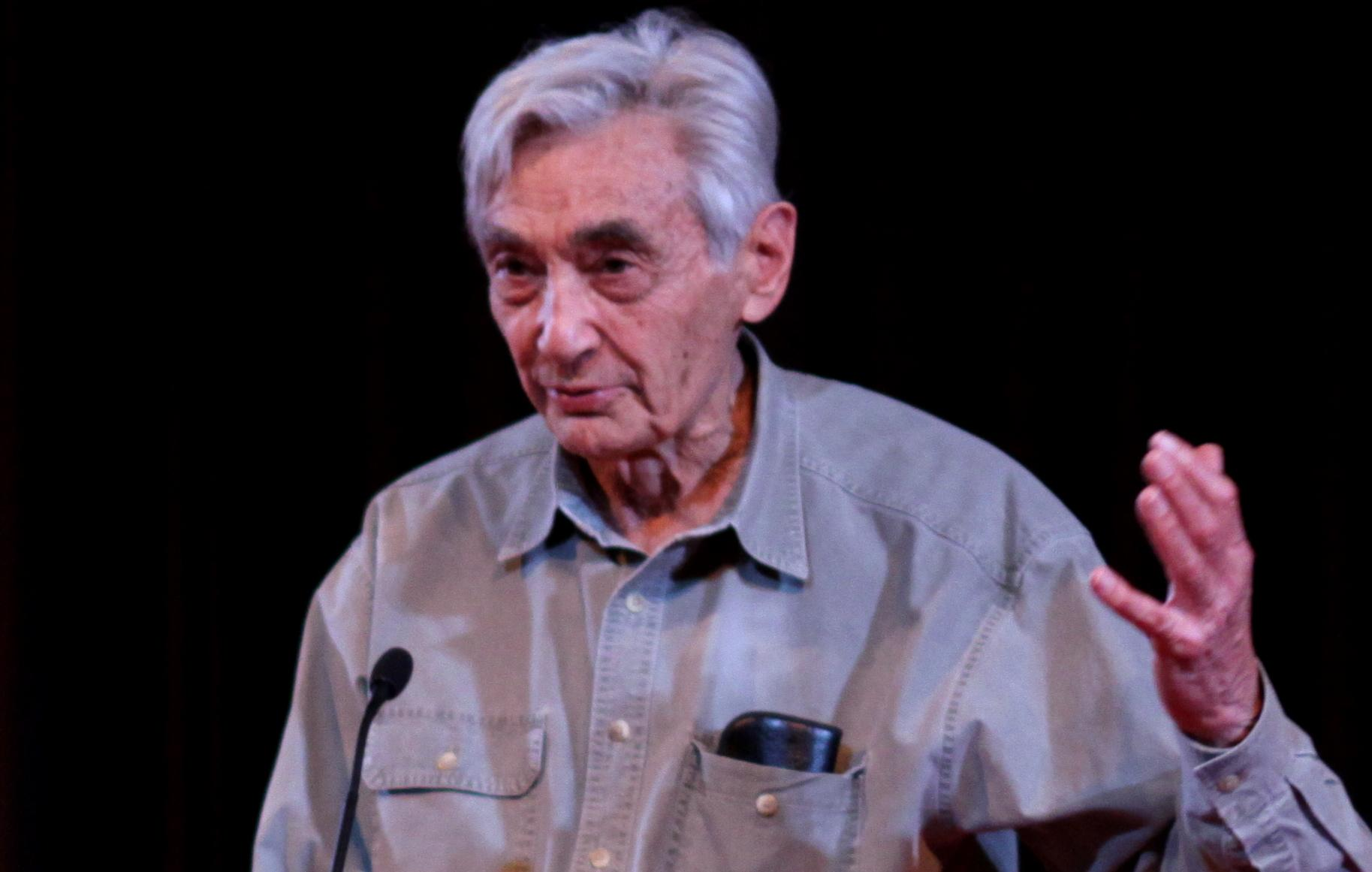
Historian and playwright Howard Zinn in 2009

A Los Angeles Times reviewer, who saw a 2001 performance at the Hollywood and Highland Center starring the actor and activist Brian Jones, said that the play "mounts a clarion defense of the principles of Marxism, while taking a timely jab at a consumerist culture run amok.... Zinn's indignation oozes through the levity, and Marx's own words remind us that capitalism without conscience is a recipe for revolution."

Publishers Weekly reviewed the play favourably: "Laid out on the page as seamless monologue, it envisions Marx in the SoHo district of New York in the present, where his mind reels at the same capitalist injustices that boggled him 150 years ago. The wizened and ailing Marx discourses on the economic state of the modern-day U.S., heatedly decrying the vast disparity between rich and poor and the corrupt, systematic funneling of the wealth that workers earn into the hands of capitalists. Through cascading recollections, we learn of Marx's devoted marriage, his love for his children and his stormy debates with Mikhail Bakunin, a fellow radical whose concept of a revolution of the spleen rather than the intellect makes Marx seem cold by comparison.... Most often it is Marx's critical wife, Jenny, and brilliant daughter Eleanor who take him to task when he fumbles. With Zinn's hefty prologue and scholarly but pointed reading list, the text is a cleverly imagined call to reconsider socialist theory as a valid philosophy in these times. Zinn's point is well made; his passion for history melds with his political vigor to make this a memorable effort and a lucid primer for readers desiring a succinct, dramatized review of Marxism."

In September 2014, the play was performed at the Audrey Herman Spotlighter's Theatre, directed by Sherrionne Brown and featuring Phil Gallagher as Karl Marx. The play was reviewed by DCMetroTheaterArts.com, who said: "... is compelling and passionate and provides uncommon insight into Marx, the man, while also examining Marx, the icon" and "The show puts into stark relief how many of the issues of Marx’s time – income inequality, poverty, and unchecked nationalism – remain with us today."

== Controversy ==
In an interview about his 2018 tour of Marx in Soho in honor of Marx's 200th birthday, actor Bob Weick described resistance he encountered, ranging from universities denying funding for professors who wanted to bring Weick to their campuses to protestors who "shot up and vandalized" a theater venue in Texas.
