= Franconia College =

Liberal arts college in Franconia, New Hampshire, U.S. (1963–78)

Coordinates: 44°13′34″N 71°43′53″W

- Type: Private
- Active: 1963–1978
- Faculty: 40 (in 1968)
- Location: Franconia College; Franconia, NH 03580, Franconia, New Hampshire, United States
- Campus: Rural

Franconia College was a small experimental liberal arts college in Franconia, New Hampshire, United States. It opened in 1963 in Dow Academy and the site of the Forest Hills Hotel on Agassiz Road, and closed in 1978, after years of declining enrollment and increasing financial difficulties.

A small, eclectic faculty provided a diverse education. Areas of studies included the fine arts, architecture, performing arts, languages, law, and business.

== History ==
Franconia College opened in the former Dow Academy buildings as a two-year college in 1963 with nine founding staff members; the school began granting four-year degrees in 1965. The school was accredited by the New England Association of Schools and Colleges.

=== 1960s ===
The school first gained national attention in 1968 when William Loeb, publisher of the Manchester Union Leader, vilified the students for behavior that included unmarried persons of the opposite sex sleeping together. The headline "Bare Debauchery at Franconia College: Sex, Liquor, Drugs Rampant on Campus" made the front page of the newspaper the same day a larger, main headline announced the assassination of Martin Luther King Jr.

While the article was believed to be exaggerated, nine students were arrested in a marijuana raid that spring, and a cascade of changes happened at the school. College president Richard Ruopp resigned at the demand of the board of trustees in April, then the board let two teachers' contracts lapse against a faculty committee recommendation to rehire them. The teachers and staff responded in July with mass resignations, leaving the college with half the number of staff it had at the beginning of the 1967–68 year. At the time, the school was running $100,000 per year in debt and the school's mortgage was threatened with foreclosure. In an attempt to ease its financial straits, the school made its grounds available as a weekend ski lodge the following winter.

=== 1970s ===
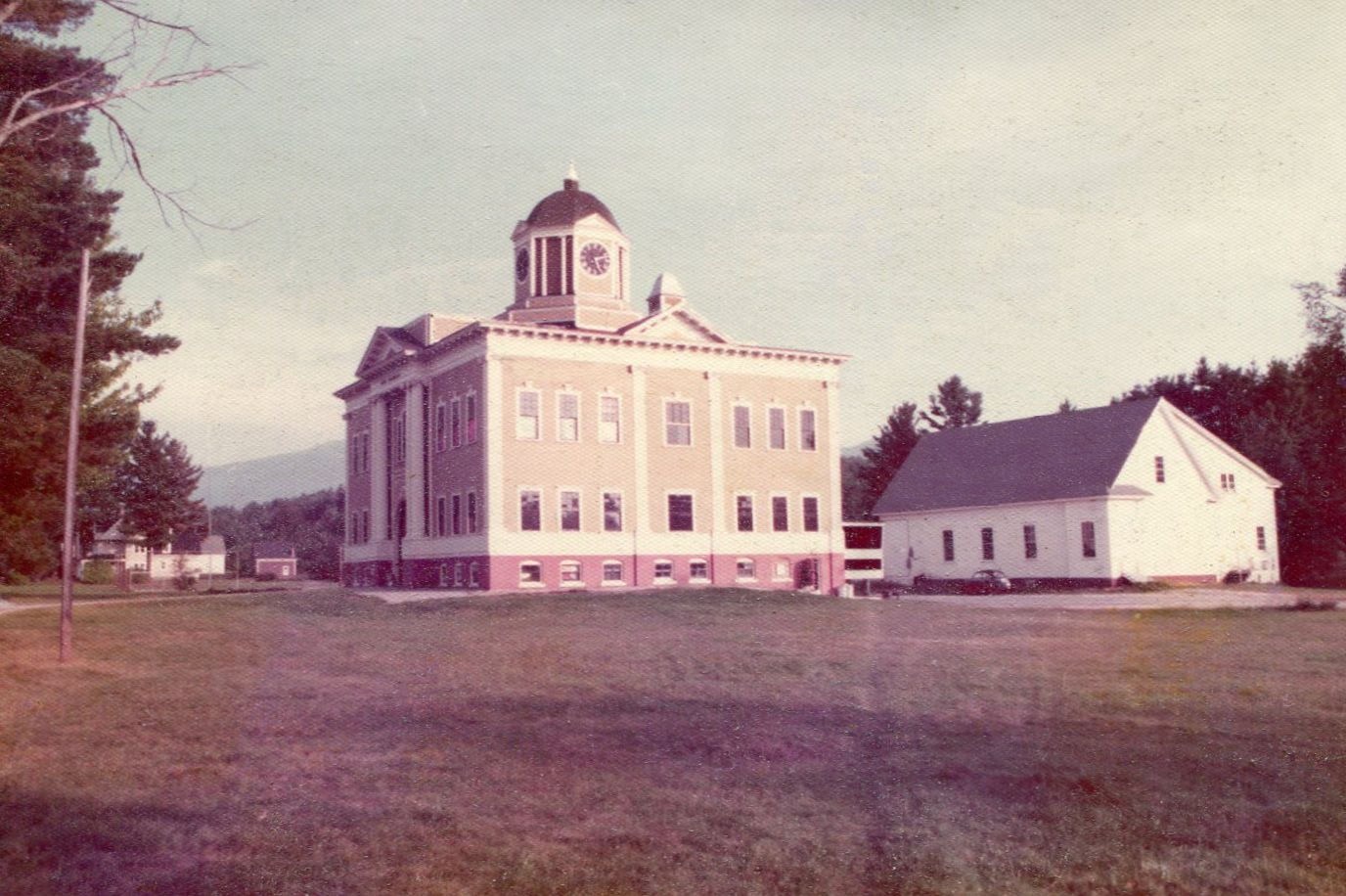
1971 Dow Academy and Dance Studio/Gym buildings

Franconia College again gained national attention in 1970, when 23-year-old Leon Botstein became the youngest college president in the country. After securing $800,000 in federal grants, Botstein oversaw new construction including three small dormitories and a student union.

In 1976, the college appeared on a segment of ABC Evening News with president Ira Goldenberg, economics professor George Wheeler and two students discussing the experiences and responsibility learned at Franconia.

Honorary degrees were conferred on Muhammad Ali and Kenneth Clark in 1977.

Franconia College closed on January 23, 1978, two days before the scheduled start of its spring semester, due to bankruptcy. According to former dean of students and director of housing and counseling services Rich Colfer, every student who contacted counseling services during the closure was placed at another college.

After Franconia College closed, the School of Human Services program moved to New Hampshire College (now Southern New Hampshire University). The program currently resides at Springfield College.

=== Enrollment ===
1963: 75
1965: 200
1968: 325
1970: 250
1972: 400
1978: 185

== Campus ==
Situated north of the White Mountain National Forest, the college provided easy access for students to the outdoor sporting activities for which the North Country is most famous. Several students lived in their own tents and tepees in the nearby woods.

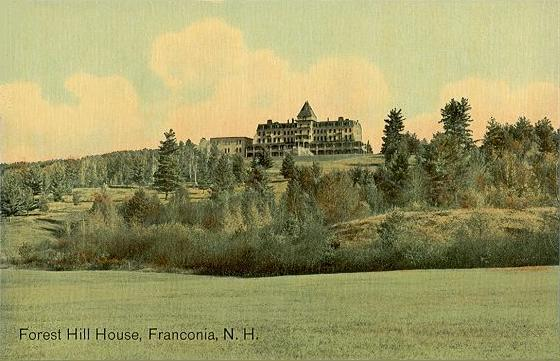
Main Building. A 1909 postcard of the Forest Hills House

The college initially used the former Dow Academy buildings. The trustees of Franconia College purchased the former Forest Hills Hotel property in 1960. The hotel had been in operation since its construction in 1882 and had been donated to the University of New Hampshire in 1956. Other buildings in town were used as classrooms and dorms.

In June 1978, the campus was offered for sale at auction but failed to sell at that time. The main hotel building was torn down in 1985, and the former college president's house, known as "The Lodge" when built in 1892, opened as a bed and breakfast called The Inn At Forest Hills in 1993. The forested areas of the hotel property were subdivided into building lots. In the village, the Dow Academy buildings turned into condominiums and Dow Field into a town recreational area.

In November 2019, the state's Division of Historical Resources installed New Hampshire Historical Marker No. 263 along NH Route 142 in Franconia at the site of the college.

== Curriculum ==
Part of Franconia College's oeuvre (body of work) was alternative education classes that were the object of study in developing new ways to teach that gave more individualized instruction and more varied opportunities. There were no required courses, no formal academic departments, and no grades. Degrees were granted after students demonstrated competence in their fields to a faculty committee.

In 1975, a group of students from the University of Pittsburgh Alternative Curriculum program toured several New England schools that were offering new and progressive programs, including Franconia College. Several students were invited to come back for a special summer session that included classes for "Sugar Maple Woodlot Management" and "Auto Mechanics". Teachers with local professional experience offered hands-on education and experience with tools of the trade and actual work experience, such as the basics of auto tune-ups, as well as learning how to evaluate a woodlot for the healthiest growth of the trees. Students learned how to safely work on cars and use a chain saw to thin the sugar maple woodlots, as well as learning how to tap a tree and how to protect oneself from the notorious black flies. One of the students reports that she was able to use the skills and experience learned in the auto mechanics class to hire on as a Journeyman marine machinist repairing diesel engines onboard Navy ships in Alameda, California.

In 1975, that same year, the college was denied a US$560,000 federal grant to support an experimental cooperative project with a local school district that met with opposition by both Governor Meldrim Thomson, Jr. and the Manchester Union Leader.

=== Extracurricular activities ===
The physics department sponsored a student UFO Study Group. In 1975, three student members contacted and interviewed Betty Hill.

== Presidents ==
- John S. Fallon (1962–1965)
- Richard R. Ruopp (1965–1968)
- Lawrence "Larry" Lemmel (1968–1970)
- Leon Botstein (1970–1975)
- Ira Goldenberg (1975–1978)

== Faculty ==
- Eliot Coleman, Spanish, (1964–1968)
- Jerome Corsi, history, (1973–1975)
- Michael Dorris, anthropology, (1970–1972)
- Peter Elbow, English, (1963–1965)
- Robert Grenier, poetry, (early 1970s)
- Peter Linebaugh, history, (1972)
- Stephen Ujlaki, film, (1971–1975)
- Mike Wallace, history, (1970)

== Notable alumni ==
- Ron Androla, poet
- Mark Beyer, artist
- Henry Corra, filmmaker
- Tim Costello, labor advocate and author
- Lenny Feinberg, documentary film maker
- Jamaica Kincaid, novelist
- Aurora Levins Morales, writer, historian and activist
- Robin Sherwood, actress
- Andy Statman, musician
- Steven "Steinski" Stein, musician
- Marc Steiner, radio talk show host
- Bill Talen, actor and activist
- Peter Winston, chess player
- Jeff Zinn, actor, director, author
