= The Suicide (play) =

1928 Russian play written by Nikolai Erdman

- Original language: Russian
- Written by: Nikolai Erdman
- Genre: Comedy

Premiere
- Date: 1979
- Place: The Other Place

The Suicide is a 1928 play by the Russian playwright Nikolai Erdman. Its performance was proscribed during the Stalinist era and it was only produced in Russia several years after the death of its writer. Today it is regarded as one of the finest plays to have come out of Communist Russia.

== Plot ==
A young, unemployed man, Semyon, believes the answer to his problems is to learn to play the tuba. However, his plan fails and he contemplates suicide. Because he is committing suicide he is able to write anything in his suicide letter without fear of reprisal from the government. His neighbour: Alexander Petrovich, decides to make money from Semyon's misery by selling space in his intended suicide note to several bidders. These bidders plan to use Semyon's suicide note to further and advertise their own individual causes. The Intelligentsia, represented by Aristarkh, is the first to approach him and is followed by others representing the Proletariat, the business world, the arts, etc.

== Productions ==
The Suicide was first translated into English by Peter Tegel and premiered by the Royal Shakespeare Company at The Other Place, Stratford, on 13 June 1979. The production was directed by Ron Daniels, and the lead role of Semyon Semyonovitch was played by Roger Rees.

It was first put on Broadway on 9 October 1980 at the ANTA Playhouse (now called the August Wilson Theatre) and closed on 30 November 1980 after 60 performances. It was directed by Jonas Jurasas, movement by Ara Fitzgerald, scene and costume by Santo Loquasto, lighting design by F. Mitchell Dana, sound design by Jack Shearing, and costume and hair design by J. Roy Helland. The cast featured Derek Jacobi, Grayson Hall, John Heffernan, Angela Pietropinto, Susan Edwards, Laura Esterman, Clarence Felder, Cheryl Giannini, Carol Mayo Jenkins, David Patrick Kelly, Derek Meader, William Myers, Mary Lou Rosato, David Sabin, Leda Siskind, Chip Zien, and Jeff Zinn.

A free adaptation called Dying For It by Moira Buffini was first performed in the Almeida Theatre, London, in 2007.

An adaptation called The Grand Gesture by Deborah McAndrew had a three-month national tour beginning on 6 September 2013 in Harrogate.

An adaptation called Guns, Lies and Roses (枪，谎言和玫瑰) directed by Meng Jinghui premiered in 2012 at the Beijing Beehive Theatre.

A version was staged at the Royal Central School of Speech and Drama in 2015, which used the historic 1930 dress rehearsal of the play in front of the censorship board of the Central Committee of the Communist Party as a framing device, adapted and directed by Ben Naylor.

Suhayla El-Bushra adapted the play for the modern day, bringing it into an urban British setting. Directed by Nadia Fall, this adaptation was performed at the National Theatre in London in 2016.
