= Margaret Mitchell (chief executive) =

CEO

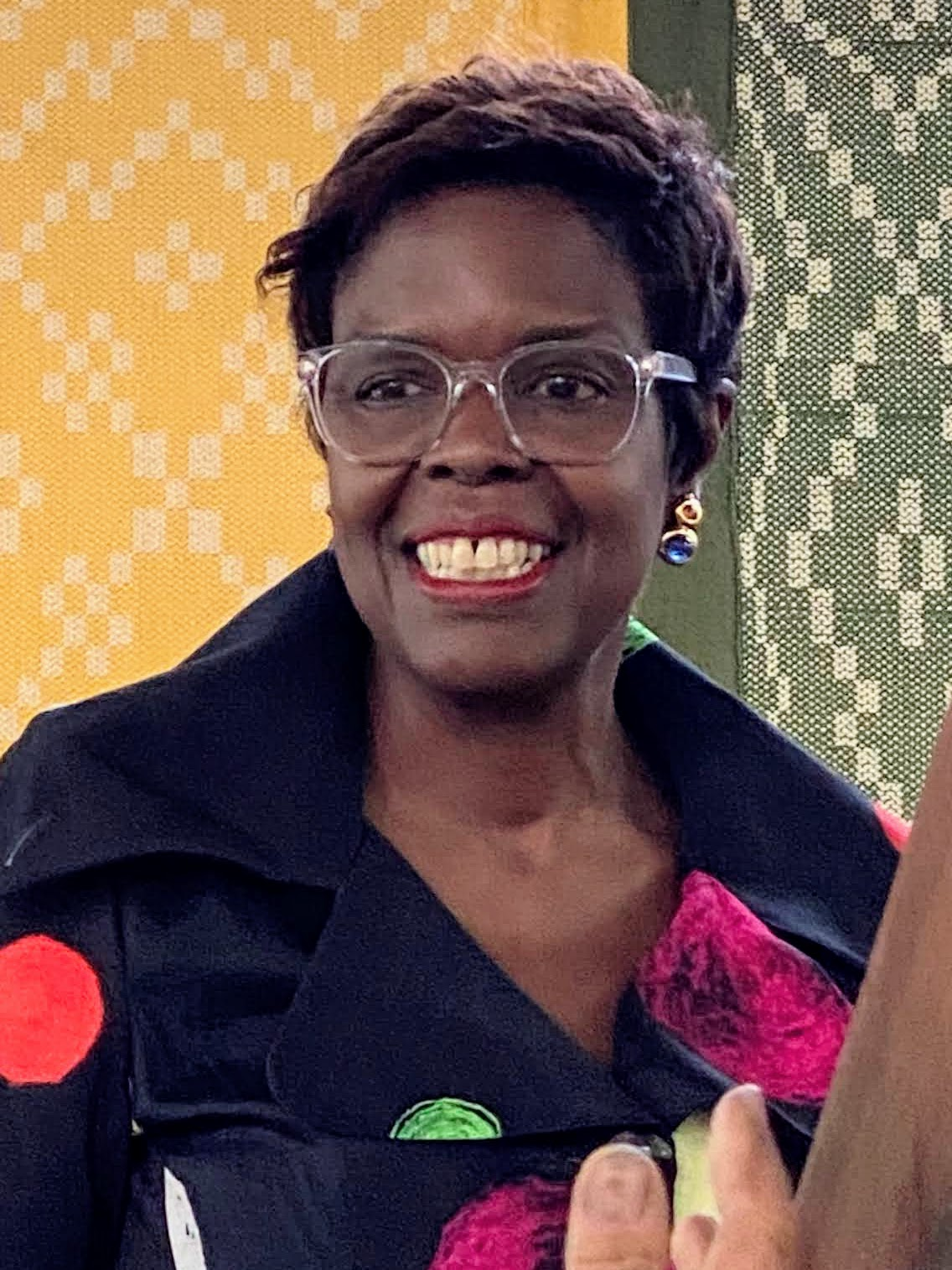
- Mitchell at the Chautauqua Institution in 2022
- Education: Hampton University
- Occupation: Chief executive officer
- Employer: YWCA USA

Margaret Mitchell is the chief executive officer of YWCA USA.

== Early life and education ==
Mitchell received a bachelor's degree in mass communications from Hampton Institute, where she was briefly the student of Maya Angelou.

== Career ==
Mitchell was announced as the CEO of YWCA USA on October 14, 2021, with an effective start date of January 2022. She was compensated $353,633 in 2024 and $357,553 in 2023 for her role as CEO. Prior to this, she was president of the YWCA of Greater Cleveland for 10 years.

Before working with the YWCA, she was the president and CEO of Big Brothers Big Sisters Greater Cleveland and VP of Business Development and Director of Partnerships at Big Brothers Big Sisters of North Texas, which changed its name to BBBS Lone Star.

In March 2022, she was part of the White House roundtable on young women's mental health.

In 2020, she received the Dr. Martin Luther King Jr. Outstanding Service Award from the Cleveland Orchestra.
