= Jeff Zinn =

American director and actor (born 1949)

- Born: December 4, 1949 (age 76) New York City
- Education: Franconia College (BA); New York University (MA); Harvard University (MFA)
- Years active: 1975–present
- Children: 2
- Parents: Howard Zinn (father); Roslynn Schechter Zinn (mother)

Jeff Zinn (born 1949) is an American director and actor who has appeared in several films by Jay Craven, and in theatre, Zinn played Danny in the off-Broadway production of Sexual Perversity in Chicago by David Mamet, and Trety in the Broadway production of The Suicide by Nikolai Erdman.

== Biography ==
Zinn began his career as a singer-songwriter performing in Boston coffeehouses and clubs including the Unicorn and the Rathskellar. He also performed in several of the G.I. coffeehouses founded by Fred Gardner, known to be “a consequential part of the anti-war movement during the Vietnam War era.” Zinn was the resident musician at the first of these, the U.F.O. in Columbia, S.C. until a police raid on a residence he shared with several soldiers (one of whom was AWOL) resulted in his arrest and brief incarceration.

At Franconia College (whose president at the time was Leon Botstein) he transitioned from music to theater under the mentorship of Ronald Bennett who had been a member of the Michael Chekhov Players. With six other classmates he formed the comedy group, the Soup Troupe, which toured colleges and universities throughout New England under the management of the Sol Hurok Agency. The group moved to New York City after graduation where they performed at the Improv and Catch A Rising Star, sharing the stage with comedians Gabe Kaplan and Andy Kaufman. The style of the Soup Troupe, having originated in the broad physicality of the Chekhov technique, was out of sync with the hip New York sensibility of the early 70s and the group disbanded. Zinn gravitated to Theater For The New City (TNC) where he had earlier appeared in Barbara Garson's play, The Co-op. Also at TNC he appeared in Chile ’73 by Jean-Claude van Itallie which toured to the Teatro Regio in Parma, Italy and in 1976 he directed the World Premier of Emma: A Play in Two Acts about Emma Goldman, American Anarchist by Howard Zinn.

Other New York theater appearances include roles in To Be Young Gifted And Black by Lorraine Hansbury featuring Elizabeth McGovern; the role of Danny in Sexual Perversity in Chicago by David Mamet at the Cherry Lane Theater with F. Murray Abraham and Jane Anderson; and the role of Trety, a gypsy guitarist, in the Broadway production of The Suicide starring Derek Jacobi. Zinn was a stand-in and photo double for John Travolta in the 1977 film Saturday Night Fever, featured in the iconic opening sequence underscored by the Bee Gees' "Stayin' Alive". An acting class with Susan Batson prompted him to pursue directing which led to associations with the West Bank Café, Circle Rep Lab and Ensemble Studio Theatre where he directed a number of new one-act and full-length plays, including his own adaptation of the D.H. Lawrence Novella, The Captain’s Doll. During this period he directed the second play written by his father, Daughter of Venus, at Theater for the New City which was picked up by Lucille Lortel for her White Barn Theatre in Westport, CT.

In 1987 he directed A Lie of the Mind by Sam Shepard at Wellfleet Harbor Actors Theater (WHAT), then in its third season. He returned the following year as Co-Artistic Director with Gip Hoppe. Over the next 25 years he produced over 200 productions of new plays, many of which he also directed including The Beauty Queen of Leenane starring Julie Harris. In 2006, having raised over seven million dollars in a capital campaign, WHAT broke ground on a new 220-seat theater which opened in 2007 with Zinn's production of The Clean House by Sarah Ruhl featuring Jessica Pimentel in the role of Mathilde. His last production at WHAT came in 2011 with Bakersfield Mist, an NNPN Rolling World Premiere, which transferred to the New Repertory Theatre in Watertown, MA, winning the Elliot Norton Award that year for Best New Play.

He was managing director of Gloucester Stage Company from 2015 to 2018. He is the author of The Existential Actor: Life and Death, Onstage and Off (Smith & Kraus, 2015) and the creator of the podcast, Gurus: The Story of Acting from Stanislavsky to Succession

=== Education ===
Zinn earned a B.A. from Franconia College where he trained with Ronald Bennett, a former member of the Michael Chekhov Players, and an M.A. from New York University. Post graduate studies include completion of the directing program at the American Repertory Theatre Institute for Advanced Theatre Training at Harvard University and a certificate in executive leadership from the Kennedy School of Government.
