= Judy Hoffman =

American filmmaker and arts activist

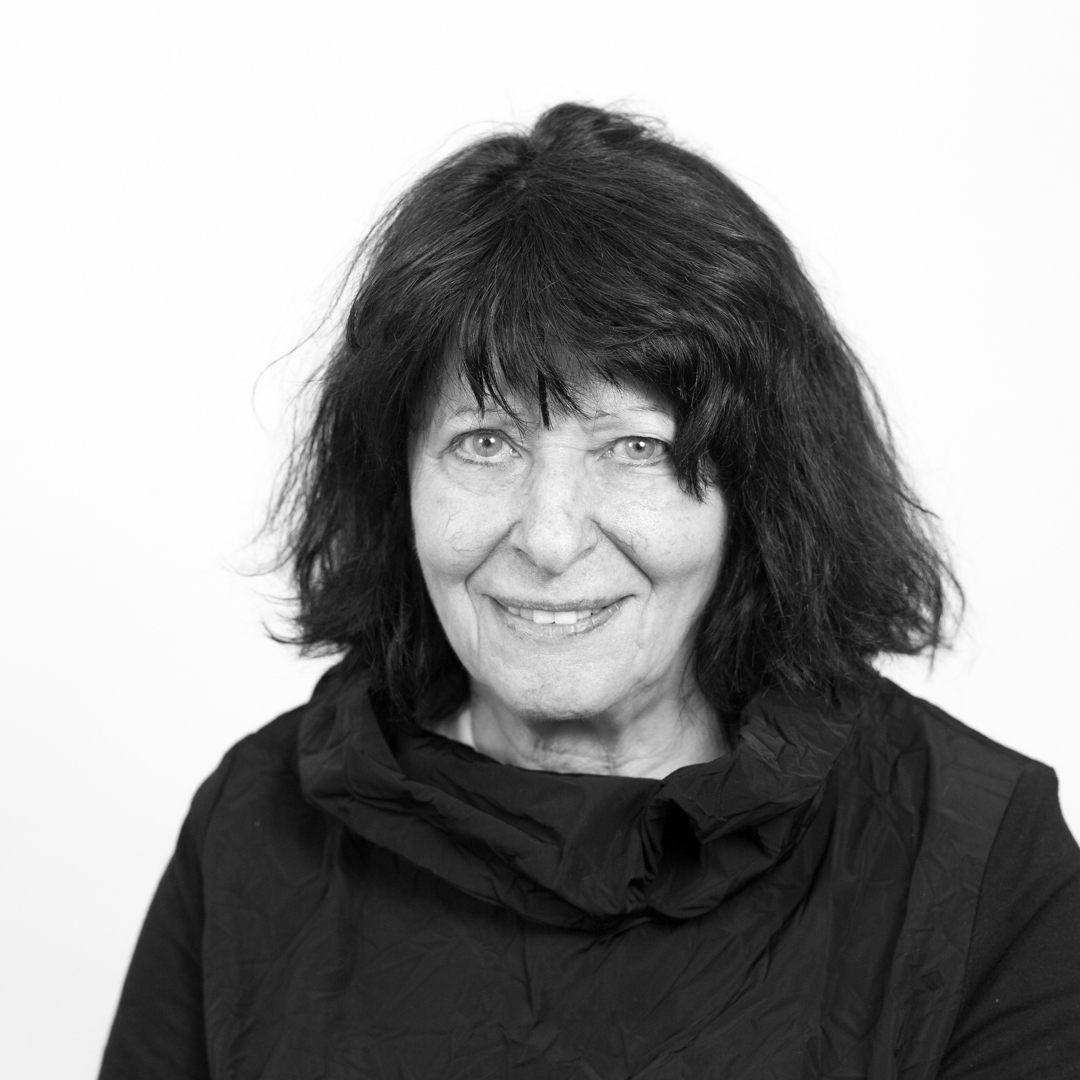
- Hoffman in 2016
- Education: Northwestern University (MFA)
- Occupation: Filmmaker

Judy Hoffman is an American filmmaker and arts activist based in Chicago. She graduated from Northwestern University with a MFA and currently holds a faculty position at the University of Chicago. Hoffman has played a major role in the development of Kartemquin Films, a documentary filmmaking company founded in Chicago in 1966. Hoffman has worked with extensively with Kwakwaka’wakw, a First Nation in British Columbia, to produce films. Hoffman has brought activism to her films, and continues to show different facets of the city of Chicago.

== Career ==
Hoffman has worked in the film industry for over 35 years. Her documentary style is influenced by her early work with small format video equipment, beginning with the Portapak and filming local Chicago communities. Most of Hoffman's work takes the form of documentaries focusing on Chicago and its development. She was involved with the Alternative Television Movement in the early 1970s, documenting activism from the inside, especially to do with civil rights in Chicago.

At the start, she worked for Jerry Temaner, one of the original founders of Kartemquin films, who ran a media production center at University of Illinois Chicago. She met Jean Rouch, French anthropologist and filmmaker, at the Ninth International Congress of Anthropological and Ethnological Sciences in 1973. After she was assigned to be his assistant and show him around for his time in Chicago, they began work on a project surrounding race and jazz in the city. Hoffman directly learned to shoot handheld and work with sound from Rouch. Hoffman conceptually became interested in cinéma vérité and the idea of shared anthropology- taking form in a collaborative approach to filmmaking with nontraditional documentaries, and often putting video equipment in the hands of the subjects.

This work connected Hoffman to the Chicago film company Kartemquin Films, a collective focused on sharing knowledge, creating socialist-minded work, and documenting Chicago. While at Kartemquin Hoffman directed Golub, which went on to debut at the New York Film Festival. The mission of Kartemquin Films, and a guiding theme in Hoffman's work, is the principle of social inquiry and promoting social change through the medium of film. Hoffman still plays a major role at Kartemquin.

Hoffman's work with the Kwakwaka'wakw First Nation of British Columbia produced films and videotapes about reclaiming the tribe's culture. Through an introduction from an exchange between the U'Mista Cultural Center for the Kwakwaka'wakw First Nation of British Columbia and the Field Museum, Hoffman produced the award-winning Box of Treasures (1983), a film documenting the efforts to repatriate cultural artifacts and create cultural revival amid political strife. Out of connections from this film, Hoffman would return to Alert Bay to work with a video training program on the N'amgis Reserve. This led to an effort in the local community to create their own educational, documentary style work about their histories and rituals.

Hoffman has worked as a producer and photographer for installations at the Smart Museum of Art and The Block Museum, among others. Judy Hoffman currently works at the University of Chicago as a lecturer in the Department of Cinema and Media Studies and Department of Visual Arts.

== Significant works ==
In 1996, Hoffman was Acting Director of The Documentary Center of Columbia College where along with Ronit Bezale she developed Voices of Cabrini. The film is about the destruction of public housing in Chicago.

In 2014, Hoffman worked as executive producer for 70 Acres in Chicago: Cabrini Green, which is the follow-up documentary to Voices of Cabrini.

Hoffman has collaborated with Barbara Kopple on American Dream in 1990. Hoffman has worked with Michelle Citron on Mixed Greens in 2004.

Judy Hoffman was the cinematographer for the films: Howard Zinn: You Can't be Neutral on a Moving Train, Sacco and Vanzetti, and Nelson Algren: The End is Nothing, The Road is All.

Hoffman's inclination towards documentary led her to film a behind the scenes look at singer Britney Spears, in a piece called Stages: Three Days in Mexico, featuring cinematography by Albert Maysles in 2002. A few years later, Hoffman was the videographer on Maysles' The Gates, which was a documentary on Jeanne Claude and Christo's Central Park installation. The documentary aired on HBO in 2006.

== Awards and honors ==
Hoffman received the VOICE Media Activism Award from Chicago's Center for Community and Media in 1994. In 2004, Hoffman was awarded the Nelson Algren Committee Award for "community activists making a significant contribution to Chicago life."

Hoffman serves on the Board's Advisory Committee to the Community TV Network, a non-profit organization in Chicago which works to promote community development among underrepresented youth through the educational tool and creative process of digital video production. This committee is one of the many places where Hoffman has worked with her colleagues from Kartemquin films, including the founder Gordon Quinn and Peter Kuttner.

In January 2018, Hoffman's film Stages: Three Days in Mexico, showed at the screening of the second season of Cinema 53, a film and discussion series at the University of Chicago's Gray Center for Arts and Inquiry. The season series: "Women Make Docs," continued Cinema 53's mission to present films made by women and people of color.

== Filmography ==
Film	Year	Genre	Position
Local 70	1975	Short Documentary	Producer, Director, Editor
HSA #4	1975	Short Documentary	Producer
HSA #1	1979	Short Documentary	Producer
Seeing Red	1983	Documentary	Camera assistant
The Last Pullman Car	1983	Documentary	Camera assistant
Box of Treasures	1984	Short Documentary	Associate Producer
Women's Voices: The Gender Gap	1984	Short documentary	Camera assistant
4 Tops live at the Park West	1984	Short Documentary	Producer
Taylor Chain II: A Story of Collective Bargaining	1984	Short	Camera assistant
American Playhouse	1984	TV series	Camera assistant
Golub	1988	Documentary	Associate Producer
Time to Make That Change	1992	Short Documentary	Producer
People for Community Recovery #1-8	1993	Short	Producer
The Good Life	1995	TV series documentary	Producer
Frank Lloyd Wright	1998	Documentary	Camera assistant
Voices of Cabrini: Remaking Chicago's Public Housing	1999	Short Documentary	Executive Producer
Nova	2001	TV series and documentary	Camera assistant
Stages: Three Days in Mexico - Britney Spears	2002	Documentary	Cinematographer, Director
Golub: Late Works Are the Catastrophes	2004	Documentary	Photographer, Associate Producer
Howard Zinn: You Can't Be Neutral on a Moving Train	2004	Documentary	Cinematographer
A Day on the Force: Women's Professional Tackle Football	2004	Documentary	Cinematographer
Sacco and Vanzetti	2006	Documentary	Videographer
The Gates	2007	Documentary	Videographer
In My Room: The Inner Life of Teen Girls	2007	Documentary	Cinematographer
70 Acres in Chicago:Cabrini Green	2014	Documentary	Executive Producer
Nelson Algren: The End Is Nothing, the Road Is All...	2015	Documentary	Camera Operator, Cinematographer
Leftovers	2017	Documentary	Videographer
