= Wendy Ruderman =

American journalist

Wendy Ruderman (born in 1969 on Long Island, N.Y.) is an American journalist for the Philadelphia Inquirer and Philadelphia Daily News. She won with Barbara Laker the 2010 Pulitzer Prize for Investigative Reporting. Ruderman, along with Inquirer colleagues Barbara Laker and Dylan Purcell, was named a finalist for the 2019 Pulitzer for local reporting for “Toxic City: Sick Schools,” which examined how environmental hazards in Philadelphia schools deprive children of healthy spaces to learn and grow.

== Life ==
Ruderman was raised in Cherry Hill, New Jersey and graduated from Western Maryland College, now McDaniel College, with a BA in communications in 1991. She was editor of The Williamstown Plain Dealer. In 1993, she worked in public relations at WHYY-TV and WHYY-FM. She graduated from Columbia University Graduate School of Journalism with an MS in 1997. She worked in the statehouse bureau of The Trenton Times,Associated Press and Bergen Record. She was a staff writer for The Philadelphia Inquirer, beginning in December 2002, before joining the Philadelphia Daily News in 2007. She and her Daily News colleague, Barbara Laker, won the 2010 Pulitzer Prize for investigative reporting for their work exposing a rogue narcotics squad with the Philadelphia Police Department. The "Tainted Justice" series, brought about an FBI / Philadelphia Police internal affairs investigation.

Ruderman left the Daily News for The New York Times in 2012 and returned to the Daily News in August 2013. She currently works on the Investigations Team at The Philadelphia Inquirer. She was named a finalist for the 2019 Pulitzer Prize for Local Reporting for her work exposing toxins in Philadelphia schools.

Ruderman serves on the Ethics Advisory Council as part of the Ethics Program at Villanova's College of Liberal Arts and Sciences.

== Works ==
- Busted: A Tale of Corruption and Betrayal in the City of Brotherly Love, HarperCollins, 2014, ISBN 978-0-06-208545-0
- The book has been optioned by a production company that is working on turning the story into a limited TV series. The New York Times Book Review section singled out “BUSTED: A Tale of Corruption and Betrayal in the City of Brotherly Love” as a true crime book that is “a personable and fast-reading ride.”

== Mackenzie Fierceton Controversy ==
On November 22, 2020, Ruderman authored a story in the Philadelphia Inquirer about University of Pennsylvania student Mackenzie Fierceton winning a Rhodes Scholarship. Fierceton later withdrew from the Rhodes program admid controversy over how she characterized herself in various applications as a "first-generation, low-income" student.

After interviewing Fierceton for roughly twenty-five minutes, Ruderman published an article that began “Mackenzie Fierceton grew up poor.” Fierceton said she never described herself this way, and Ruderman acknowledged that Fierceton did not describe herself as poor. Still, Ruderman's language was used in the Rhodes Trust's investigation to support the allegation that Fiereceton misrepresented herself as growing up poor. The University of Pennsylvania's investigators did not find evidence that this misleading statement could be attributed to specific actions by Fierceton.
