= Howard Zinn: A Life on the Left =

Biography of Howard Zinn

- First edition
- Author: Martin Duberman
- Genre: biography
- Published: 2012
- Publisher: The New Press
- ISBN: 978-1-59558-678-0

Howard Zinn: A Life on the Left is a biography of historian and activist Howard Zinn, written by fellow historian Martin Duberman and published in 2012.

== Reception ==
John Tirman, the head of the MIT Center for International Studies since 2004, notes that Duberman fills in Zinn's history beyond what other sources "commonly focused on" following his death, highlighting not only Zinn's role as orator and activist, but also "his considerable intellectual achievements," including how "he challenged the notion of objectivity." Tirman describes Duberman as "a strong writer who brings an easy familiarity to this subject" while not shying "away from thorny topics." However, Tirman notes that the book lacks an exploration of the dynamics between Zinn and others in his activist circle: Noam Chomsky, Frances Fox Piven, and others. Further, Tirman notes the omission of a discussion on the decline of the left through the '60s and '70s. Nonetheless, Tirman says that "Duberman's biography captures what was so attractive about this radical historian."

Michael Kammen, a professor of American cultural history at Cornell, say that "[Zinn] could not be more fortunate in his amicable biographer." Kammen describes the book as "not merely judicious. It is laudatory where praise is warranted yet critical in many respects, too." Though Kammen warns that, "As the biography proceeds, the values and voices of these two writers increasingly merge, especially in chapter 11, devoted to 'The Nineties,'" he notes that the book "contains countless dividends for the general reader."

Kirkus Reviews suggests this book is best for readers who have a favourable impression of Zinn, for Duberman "clearly has no interest in challenging [Zinn's] fundamental underpinnings."
