= Howard Zinn: You Can't Be Neutral on a Moving Train =

- Directed by: Deb Ellis; Denis Mueller
- Starring: Daniel Berrigan; Howard Zinn; Alice Walker
- Narrated by: Matt Damon
- Music by: Richard Martinez
- Distributed by: First Run Features
- Release date: 2004
- Running time: 78 minutes
- Language: English

Howard Zinn: You Can't Be Neutral on a Moving Train is a 2004 documentary film narrated by Matt Damon about the life and times of historian, activist and author Howard Zinn and his involvement in some of the most important social movements of the past fifty years. The film was directed by Deb Ellis and Denis Mueller.

== Release ==
Between June and December, 2004 the film had a nationwide theatrical release, playing in over 50 cities across the country. In November 2004 the film was "short-listed" for an Academy Award, and in 2005 the film was released on DVD.

== Critical reception ==
The film has a 97% fresh rating by critics on Rotten Tomatoes.

In 2008, the film was chosen by the Zinn Education Project (a collaboration of two national organizations, Rethinking Schools and Teaching for Change) to be included in an education package sent to 4000 high school and junior high school teachers across the country.

- "A concise primer that should well satisfy those with a casual interest in his career". Frank Scheck, The Hollywood Reporter.
- "A thinker and an educator, Zinn has led a life of commitment and compassion and the film offers a loving tribute". Steven Rea, Philadelphia Inquirer
- "Finally, a documentary about one of America’s most important academics". Jonathan Curiel, San Francisco Chronicle

== Translation and International Distribution ==
- Germany, Fall 2007 Howard Zinn: You Can't Be Neutral on a Moving Train - Eine amerikanische Lebensgeschichte, Published by Schwarzer Freitag, Berlin, Germany http://schwarzerfreitag.com/de/, 2007
- Non puoi essere neutrale quando il treno si muove, Lumière Group Multimediale, Rome, Italy, 2008

In 2010, a new Commemorative DVD with an extra hour of bonus materials was released by First Run Features.

== Cast ==
In alphabetical order:

- Daniel Berrigan
- Clayborne Carson
- Oscar Chase
- Noam Chomsky
- Jay Craven
- Matt Damon (narrator)
- Marian Wright Edelman
- Daniel Ellsberg
- Tom Hayden
- Staughton Lynd
- Bob Moses
- Ray Mungo
- Frances Fox Piven
- David Rovics
- Cleveland Sellers
- John Silber
- Alice Walker
- Howard Zinn
