= Barbara Laker =

American journalist

- Born: Kent, England
- Education: Missouri School of Journalism
- Occupation: Journalist

Barbara Laker is an American journalist for the Philadelphia Daily News. With Wendy Ruderman, she won the 2010 Pulitzer Prize for Investigative Reporting.

== Early life and education ==
Laker grew up in Kent, England. She immigrated to the United States when she was 12. She graduated from the Missouri School of Journalism with a Bachelor of Journalism in 1979.

== Career ==
In 1993, Laker joined the staff of the Philadelphia Daily News as a general assignment reporter. She has also worked for the Clearwater Sun, the Atlanta Journal-Constitution, the Dallas Times-Herald, and the Seattle Post-Intelligencer.

Laker's "Tainted Justice" series brought about an FBI / Philadelphia Police internal affairs investigation.

== Works ==
- Busted: A Tale of Corruption and Betrayal in the City of Brotherly Love, HarperCollins, 2014, 978-0-06-208544-3
