= Teaching for Change =

Non-profit organization

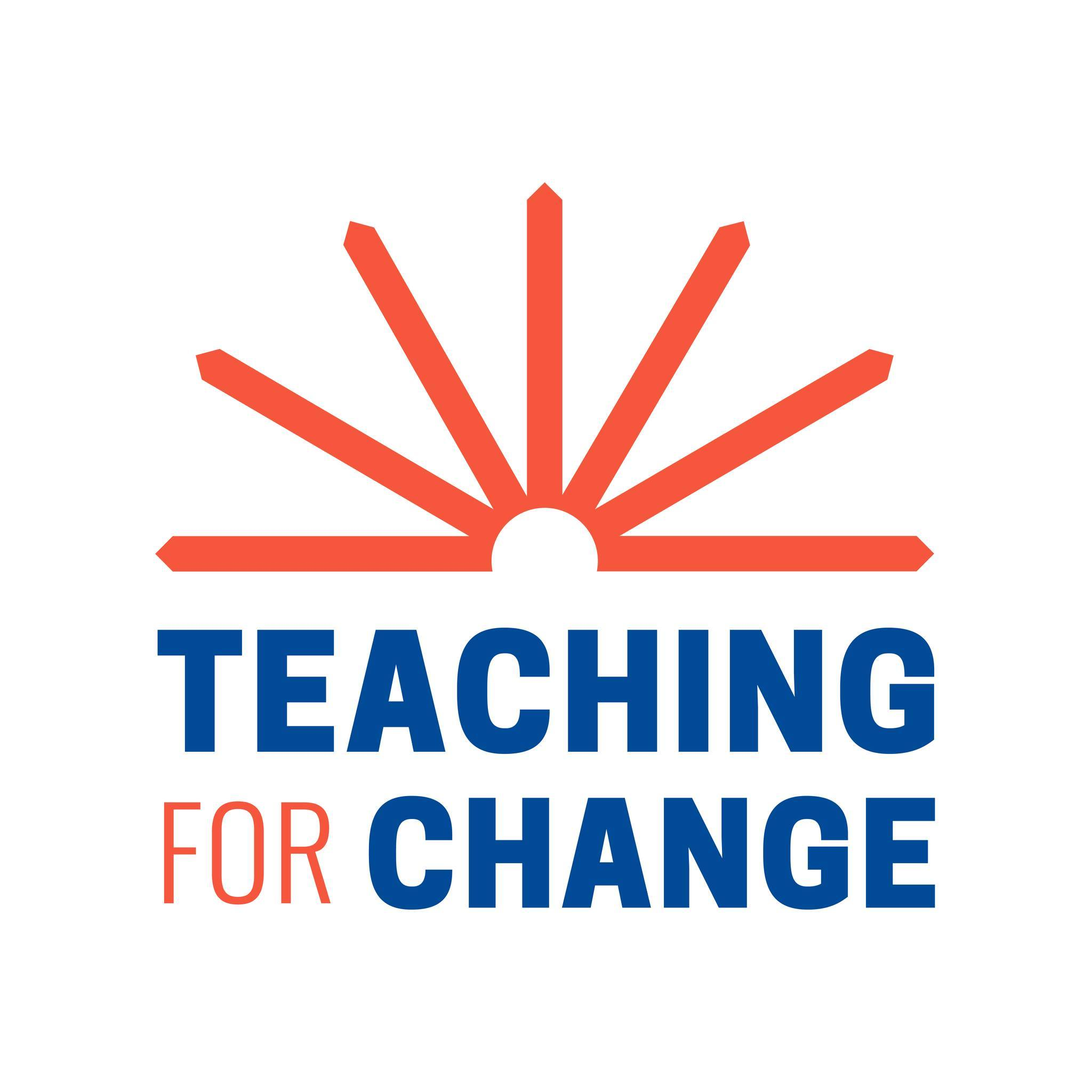
- Founded: December 1989
- Type: 501(c)3
- Tax ID no.: 52-1616482
- Purpose: educational
- Location: Washington, DC
- Coordinates: 38°55′04″N 77°01′54″W
- Region served: United States
- Method: parent organizing, professional development, and publications
- Key people: Nzinga Tull, Board Co-Chair
- Employees: 21
- Website: www.teachingforchange.org
- Formerly called: Network of Educators on Central America

Teaching for Change is a non-profit organization founded in 1989 and based in Washington, D.C., with the motto of "building social justice, starting in the classroom." This organization uses publications, professional development, and parent organizing programs to accomplish this goal.

== Programming ==
Teaching for Change coordinates a variety of programs that aim to encourage teachers, students, and parents to build a more equitable, multicultural society through education.

=== Civil Rights Teaching ===
As of 2006, the state of Mississippi "passed the Civil Rights/Human Rights Education in the Mississippi Public Schools Curriculum bill," which mandated "the integration of civil rights and human rights" topics into the curriculum of the K-12 schools under its purview. Accordingly, Teaching for Change worked with the McComb School District and the Mississippi Department of Education for ten years to incorporate lessons on the civil rights movement and labor history in the curriculum. The stated intention was to help schools "end a decades-old culture of silence" on difficult historical events in the region.

McComb Legacies, an after-school and summer enrichment program, grew out of the partnership between Teaching for Change and the McComb School District. As part of McComb Legacies, high school students work as historians to uncover the history of the voting rights struggle in McComb and Mississippi. In the spring of 2013, two McComb student projects made it to the national level of the National History Day competition. The Voting Rights Struggle, a documentary film created by McComb students, tells the story of the first SNCC voter registration drive, which was located in McComb. The film can now be seen at the African American Civil War Museum in Washington, DC.

In 2024, Teaching for Change published the second edition of the publication, Putting the Movement Back Into Civil Rights Teaching.

=== D.C. Area Educators for Social Justice ===
In 2017, Teaching for Change launched DC Area Educators for Social Justice, a community of mutual support for educators to collaborate on curriculum, professional learning, and activism. Beginning in 2018, DC Area Educators for Social Justice has led the yearly D.C. Area Black Lives Matter at School Week of Action. Beginning in 2015, DC Area Educators brought together local social justice teachers to form a graduate level writing group in a program titled Stories from our Classroom. Some of these stories went onto be published in The Atlantic, Huffington Post, Edutopia, and other well-known periodicals.

=== Teaching Central America ===
In 2017, Teaching for Change launched the website Teaching Central America. The website offers free downloadable lessons, biographies, poetry, and prose from Central American writers such as Roque Dalton, Rigoberta Menchú, Claribel Alegría, and Ernesto Cardenal.

=== Social Justice Books ===
Teaching for Change launched the Social Justice Books website in 2017. The Social Justice Book site contains more than 60 carefully selected lists of multicultural and social justice books for children, young adults, and educators, along with dozens of book reviews coordinated by the See What We See (SWWS) coalition.

=== Zinn Education Project ===
Teaching for Change co-founded the Zinn Education Project with Rethinking Schools in 2008 to provide teachers with free resources to help teach a people's history including free downloadable lesson plans as a companion to Howard Zinn's A People's History of the United States and other classroom resources for educators around the country. Close to a quarter of teachers surveyed in a 2024 study by the American Historical Association use resources from the Zinn Education Project.

Former Programs

=== Tellin' Stories ===
The Tellin' Stories program is a process for building parent engagement in schools. This program uses a bottom-up approach, encouraging parents to define what their roles will be. The training plan has four stages:

- Community Building: families meet each other and learn about their schools;
- Information Gathering: parents analyze the school climate, the facilities, and the quality of teaching and learning at their school;
- Identifying and Prioritizing Concerns: parents investigate concerns with schools (using Right Question Project methodology); and
- Taking Action: parents determine the action required to achieve desired results and work collectively to promote those actions.

=== Teaching for Change Bookstore ===
Teaching for Change founded and operated an independent, non-profit bookstore located inside Busboys and Poets 14th and V Streets location for ten years. The bookstore hosted author events and provided selections of books focusing on progressive politics, multicultural lessons for pre K-12, and people's history.

Teaching for Change helped bring noted authors to host readings, discussions and book signings, including Alice Walker, Howard Zinn, Cornel West, Ronald Takaki, Michelle Alexander, Melissa Harris-Perry, John Sayles, Nikki Giovanni, Bob Moses, Juan Gonzalez, Ralph Nader, Taylor Branch, Dave Zirin, Naomi Klein, Tariq Ali, Clarence Lusane, Marita Golden, Charles E. Cobb Jr., Bernie Sanders, Edwidge Danticat, Judy Richardson, and Junot Díaz. Teaching for Change closed its bookstore in April 2015 and shared its recommendations for books online.

== History ==
In the 1980s, with a growing Central American population and U.S. involvement in the region, 11 committees of educators and community leaders formed across the country to assess how to address the needs of Central American students and increase public awareness about U.S. foreign policy in Central America. These committees convened in Los Angeles to form a national organization, the Network of Educator's Committees on Central America (NECCA) that became incorporated in December 1989

Through the early 90s they produced teaching resources on Nicaragua and El Salvador and hosted teacher workshops around the country based on the book Rethinking Columbus. In 1993, NECCA won the Humanities award from the DC Humanities Council and in 1994 they launched a mail order catalog for progressive teaching resources.

As the organization expanded its focus, Network of Educator's Committees on Central America changed its name to Teaching for Change. Through the 1990s, Teaching for Change organized seminars for educators on social justice education topics and published their own teaching guide, Beyond Heroes and Holidays: A Practical Guide to K-12 Anti-Racist, Multicultural Education and Staff Development.

In 1999, Teaching for Change hosted a seminar for educators in the DC area focusing on "putting the movement back into Civil Rights" history teaching at Howard University. That seminar led to the production of a teaching guide with the same name, in collaboration with the Poverty and Race Resource Action Council (PRRAC).

Putting the Movement Back into Civil Rights Teaching won the Philip C. Chinn book of the year award and Teaching for Change won the National Association for Multicultural Education Organization of the Year in 2004.

In 2005, Teaching for Change was invited by former board member and entrepreneur Andy Shallal to open a bookstore in Busboys and Poets.

In 2008, in partnership with Rethinking Schools, they launched the Zinn Education Project to provide middle and high school teachers with free access to lessons for Howard Zinn’s A People's History of the United States and other people's history resources.

In 2014, Teaching for Change was attacked by Rush Limbaugh who said of the organization, "it’s racist, it’s bigoted."

Teaching for Change launched the Teach the Beat initiative to bring go-go artists to D.C. classrooms and was among the national recipients of the W. K. Kellogg Foundation Family Engagement Awards in 2014.

In 2019, the Zinn Education Project achieved the milestone of 100,000 registered teachers in the program. Also, during Latinx Heritage Month, Teaching for Change began its first yearly "Teach Central America Week" to strengthen students' knowledge of Central America.

In 2024, Teaching for Change was selected to receive the UNA-NCA Community Human Rights Award.
