= Yaya Fink =

Israeli politician (born 1984)

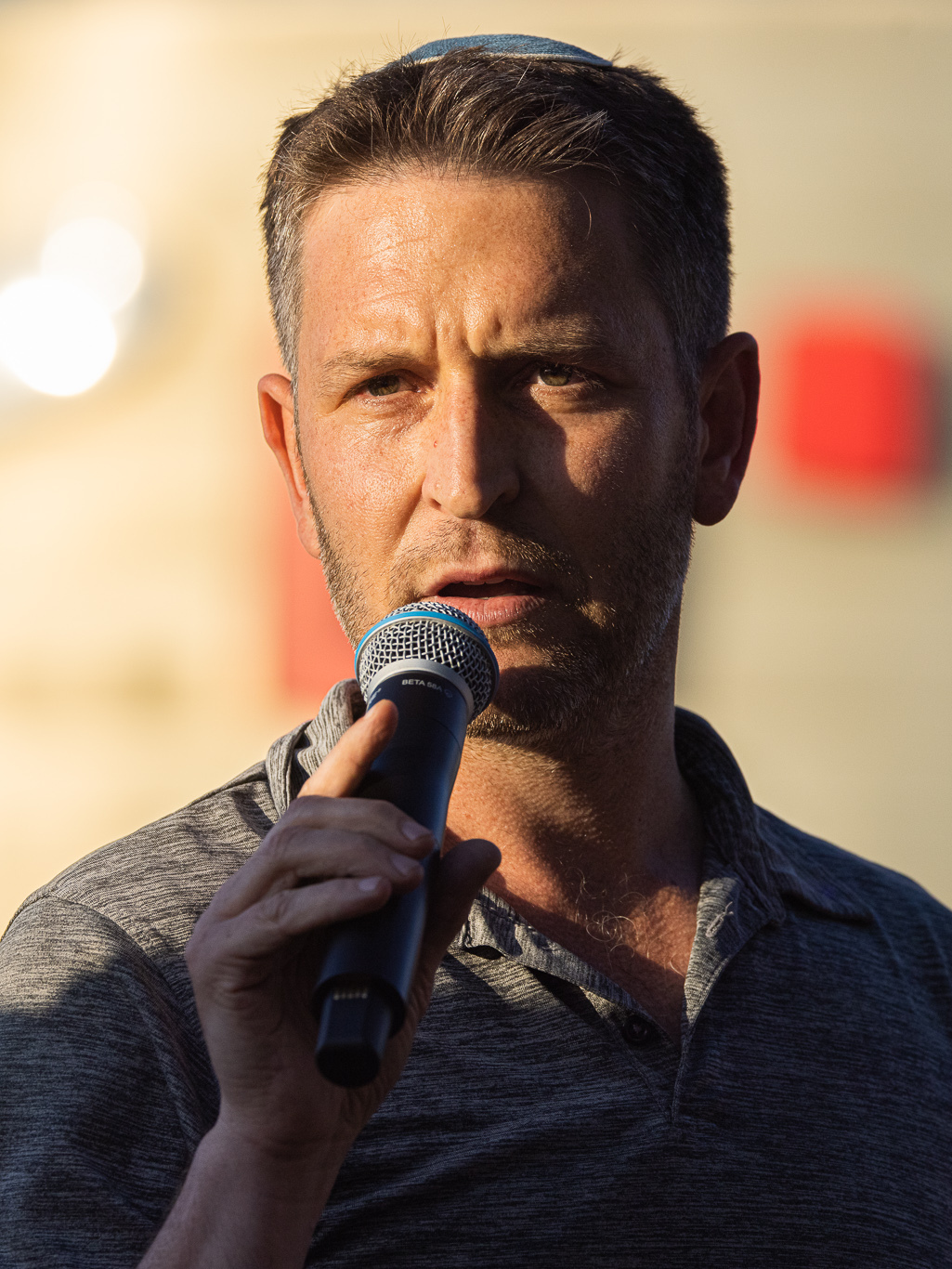
- Fink in 2023

Faction represented in the Knesset
- 2026–: The Democrats

Personal details
- Born: 14 June 1984 (age 42) Jerusalem, Israel
- Website: yayafink.co.il

Yair "Yaya" Fink (Hebrew: יאיר "יאיא" פינק; born 14 June 1984) is an Israeli Member of Knesset. Before being elected, he was a social and political activist.

== Biography ==
Fink was born in Jerusalem, the youngest of six siblings, to parents who made Aliya from the United States. He was educated at the Hartman high school and yeshiva of the religious kibbutz in Ma'ale Gilboa. After his studies he completed his military service as an officer in the Paratroopers Brigade. After his release, he voluntarily managed the "Good Neighbor" association, and later served as the spokesperson for Jerusalem City Council member Rachel Azaria. Fink earned a bachelor's degree in political science and an MBA from the Hebrew University of Jerusalem.

== Public activities ==
In 2011–2013, during the Eighteenth (2009–2012) and Nineteenth (2013–2015) Knessets, he served as the Chief of Staff of MK Shelly Yachimovich as the Leader of the Labor Party and the Speaker of the Opposition. He managed the field headquarters of the Tag Meir Association. In 2014–2015, Fink managed the field headquarters of the Ofek Credit Union, and was one of its founders.

In 2015, he founded the lobbying project Lobby 99, which he managed until 2019. In 2016, he was selected as one of The Marker's 100 most influential people and in 2017, he was selected, together with Linor Deutsch, to Calcalist's list of promising young people.

Between 2020–2022, he served as the CEO of the "Darkenu" movement, and within this framework, he founded the independent media channel "DemocratTV". He was also a member of the public council of the non-profit organization "Tzav Pius" (Reconciliation Order).

Since 2017, Fink has been sitting in the Histadrut House of Representatives as the head of the "Social Justice" faction. He serves as the head of the "Social Justice Division", within which he also works to educate the younger generation. He is also active in the field of LGBT workers' rights together with Maggie Moore, and for the rights of working reservists.

In 2019, ahead of the elections for the twenty-first Knesset, he ran in the primary elections for the Labor Party's list, was elected in eighth place in the list's primary, but did not enter the Knesset. Ahead of the elections for the twenty-fifth Knesset, Fink ran again in the Labor Party primary, was elected in sixth place in the primary, and this time also did not enter the Knesset. In this election campaign, he established the Religious Zionism Headquarters within the party.

In 2023, at the beginning of the twenty-fifth Knesset, he was one of the leaders of the protests against the judicial reform led by Justice Minister Yariv Levin. As part of his activities, he helped establish protest centers in the periphery and held multi-participant video conference calls regarding issues on the agenda.

In September 2024, Fink, together with Information Science Prof. Karine Nahon, and journalist Tomer Avital, organized a conference in Haifa to set priorities and exchange ideas on how to prepare a legislative agenda for a center-left government which attendees hope will replace Prime Minister Benjamin Netanyahu’s right-wing coalition. Fink founded the "Liberal Consumer Forum" following boycotts by right-wing activists of businesses that expressed support for the protests and within its framework he initiated the "Liberal Brand", which unites under it businesses that supported the protests. He led the Youth March for Democracy, a week-long march from Tel Aviv to Jerusalem.

Crowdfunding projects he initiated or participated in: the rehabilitation of Kibbutz Be'eri, assistance to 4-year-old Abigail Idan who returned from Hamas captivity and to her new family, financial assistance to the Michal Sela Forum following budget cuts by the government, support for the orphans Romi-Shira and Leah Suissa and the children of Ravid Katz who lost their parents during the October 7 attacks, assistance to Palestinians whose homes were burned in the riots in Huwara and assistance to the children of the Baranes family whose parents were killed by a rocket in the Golan Heights. During the Iron Swords War, Fink established the "Reservists' Forum for Equal Service," which numbers approximately fifteen thousand reservists, both male and female, for the security of Israel and for the value of equality, and is one of the leaders of the protest for equal burden. In response to the insults received by footballer Mohammad Abu Fani, Fink submitted a letter of apology to the player, which was signed by thousands.

Fink serves in the reserves as a brigade staff officer with the rank of major. Following Minister Yoav Gallant's first dismissal, in March 2023, Fink announced the cessation of his volunteering for the reserves. With the outbreak of the Iron Swords War, he returned to reserve service.

In September 2024, Fink was named one of The Marker magazine's People of the Year.

== Political career ==
In The Democrats primary elections held on 20 July 2026, ahead of the 2026 Israeli legislative election, Fink came in at number five on the slate and was elected as the party won eight seats.

On 10 November, Fink was sworn in as a member of the 26th Knesset.

== Personal life ==
Fink lives in Yokneam, is married to Oria, is a father of two, and leads a religious lifestyle.
