= 99 Percent Declaration =

Non-profit organization in Kentucky, United States

- Website logo
- Created: October 7, 2011
- Author: 99% Declaration Working Group

The 99 Percent Declaration or 99% Declaration is a not-for-profit organization based in Kentucky that originated from a working group of the Occupy Wall Street (OWS) movement in Zuccotti Park, New York City, in October 2011. The organization published a document calling for a "National General Assembly" to be held beginning the week of July 4, 2012 in Philadelphia, which was rejected by the general assemblies of OWS and Occupy Philadelphia. The Declaration includes demands for an immediate ban on all monetary and gift contributions to all politicians, implementation of a public financing system for political campaigns, and the enactment of an amendment to the United States Constitution overturning the Supreme Court's Citizens United v. FEC decision.

== Background ==
The Occupy Wall Street movement began as an advertised demonstration which posed the question "What is our one Demand?", inviting protesters to identify and rally around a particular cause. This led several individuals and groups to propose various demands including the 99 Percent Declaration.

"Occupy" protesters from across the country have said that the 99 Percent Declaration group "is simply co-opting the 'Occupy' name", and Occupy Wall Street has not endorsed the 99% Declaration, which reportedly "generated more controversy than consensus" at the New York General Assembly and was "flat out rejected by the Philadelphia General Assembly." The Occupy Philadelphia General Assembly stated that "We do not support the 99% Declaration, its group, its website, its National GA and anything else associated with it." Occupy Wall Street released a statement indicating that "[t]he group's plans blatantly contradict OWS' Statement of Autonomy, as passed by the General Assembly at Occupy Wall Street," and clarifying that any statement issued outside of the New York City General Assembly's website "should be considered independent of Occupy Wall Street." A Washington Times editorial criticized the group's proposed restrictions on political contributions and speech, saying they "would leave us less free and show a woeful contempt for the First Amendment."

Attorney Michael Pollok had issued a press release representing himself as the group's co-founder and publicizing its plans, also expressing understanding that the NY General Assembly "fears 'co-opting' by Occupy spin-off groups like ours", but indicating his belief that "occupations and protests will not end the corporate state" and that a petition for redress of grievances is the best way to achieve the "dismantling [of] corporate control of our country".

Michael Pollok has stated on his earliest websites and Facebook pages (since deleted or edited) that he came into contact with OWS through providing legal representation to several of the people who were arrested on September 30, 2011 during a march of 700 protesters across the Brooklyn Bridge. None of those protesters has ever come forward to verify this.

Very early on, the group was fraught with contention among participants and went through several incarnations of leadership before the actual event that took place the weekend of July 4, 2012.

The group spent approximately $30,000 on voting software, voting handhelds, and support which depleted the group's budget and caused them to cancel promises to pay for all delegate transportation costs. Despite that setback, about 75 people attended out of the planned 100. A lot of debate occurred in the first of two days about only having Yes and No options on the handhelds. [A May 2025 Model Constitutional Convention held at Arizona State University used paddles. https://www.youtube.com/watch?v=oSFPOrEtQGc]

Despite some setbacks, the National Assembly generated 15 grievances. Instead of grievances, some delegates preferred to call them proposed Amendments to the Constitution. After the two day assembly, the Executive Committee typed up the grievances and submitted them to the President and Congress as specified in the Constitution. Then the delegation marched to Independence Hall and read the grievances on the lawn.

For more information about the 2012 National Assembly, please view Eliot Hochberg's YouTube video below.

Due to depletion of funds for the National Assembly, 99 Percent Declaration disbanded afterwards.

In 2024, Michael Kelley, a delegate at the 2012 National Assembly, founded ProjectLeapfrog.org, a non-profit dedicated to calling a Limited Constitutional Convention with just two Draft Amendments: Rights of People Only and Rights of Campaign Finance Limits.

== The document and national general assembly ==
A national general assembly, the Continental Congress 2.0, was announced in March 2012. It was organized by the 99% Declaration working group. The Congress was to comprise 878 delegates, from all 435 Congressional districts, Puerto Rico and the District of Columbia; however not every district was represented though about 836 contributed to topics to be included and voting on their selection for inclusion in the petition. Only about 76 delegates were finally elected and present at the gathering, which lasted from July 2 to 4.

The Congress drafted and ratified a 21st-century petition for the redress of grievances, in accordance with the right to petition guaranteed by the First Amendment of the Constitution. The petition was to be publicly presented to the American people and copies were to be served to the United States Congress, Supreme Court and President Barack Obama.

The Occupy National Gathering movement was protesting in Philadelphia during the gathering.

== See also ==
- Occupy Wall Street
- Liberty Square Blueprint
- We are the 99%
- Lobby 99
