= David G. Johnson =

American film producer

David Johnson (born September 19, 1956) is a lawyer and producer who founded Act 4 Entertainment, a Los Angeles-based filmed entertainment, and new media content company focused on creating socially conscious content to inspire change. He was a founder of Agility Capital, LLC, a venture fund for early stage companies and is chair emeritus of the board of trustees at the Museum of Contemporary Art (MOCA); and serves as a member of the boards of the Public Counsel Law Center, Children Now, Dream Foundation Human Rights Watch (California) and Yale School of Drama.

== Personal background ==
Johnson grew up in Fort Wayne, Indiana and is a 1978 graduate of Yale College where he studied economics. While at Yale he was a leader in the Yale Political Union and Chairman on the constituent Independent Party. He graduated Harvard Law School in 1981. He is married to Suzanne Nora Johnson.

== Professional background ==
Johnson is founder of Act 4 Entertainment, a Los Angeles-based filmed entertainment and new media content company to inspire and motivate audiences toward social action. Act 4 is in development on approximately 20 feature film, television and new media projects, as well as a live stage musical production.

Johnson most recently produced the live stage musical version of American Psycho at the Almeida Theatre in London. He executive produced Angels in Exile, a feature-length documentary about street kids of Durban, South Africa narrated by Charlize Theron and executive produced The People Speak, a feature-length documentary about America's struggles with war, class, race and women's rights with Matt Damon, Josh Brolin, Morgan Freeman, Sean Penn, and Bruce Springsteen, among others. Johnson produced The New York Times Critics Pick The Man Nobody Knew, a feature-length documentary about the career and family life of highly controversial CIA Director William Colby.

Act 4 past, current and future projects include but are not limited to:

- The People Speak (documentary feature film)
- The Man Nobody Knew (documentary feature film)
- Angels In Exile (documentary feature film)
- American Psycho (musical stage play)
- Burying the Ex (narrative feature film)
- Patriotic Treason (narrative feature Film)
- Florence Of Arabia (narrative feature film)

Johnson is also a current (as of August 2012) board member and former chairperson of the Public Counsel Law Center, the nation's largest public interest pro bono law firm.

Johnson founded the Public Counsel Law Center's Impact Litigation Project, the first in the nation to recognize that the economic divide is also a legal issue and one that can be addressed in the courts. The Impact Litigation Project addresses economic justice through large-scale litigation—helping thousands and changing the law itself. In 2011 Public Counsel won Reed v. the State of California, a groundbreaking lawsuit preventing the disproportionate layoffs of teachers at the most economically challenged schools in Los Angeles, California.

Additionally, in the areas of social justice, Johnson serves on the boards of trustees as the Chair Emeritus for the Museum of Contemporary Art, Los Angeles (MOCA); Children Now, a national child policy and advocacy organization; the Dream Foundation, a wish-granting organization for terminally ill adults; and Human Rights Watch (California), one of the world's leading organizations dedicated to defending human rights.

Johnson is a member of the Los Angeles Economy and Jobs Committee.

In 2000, Johnson founded Agility Capital, LLC, a venture fund for early stage companies, and had previously served as senior executive vice president at Metro-Goldwyn-Mayer Inc. (MGM). Prior to MGM, he was a partner of the international law firm White & Case.

== Awards and recognition ==
In 2012, Congressional Minority Leader Nancy Pelosi (D-Calif.) presented Johnson with Public Counsel Law Center's Founders Award for his commitment to the organization.
