= A People's History of American Empire =

Graphic, nonfiction book by Howard Zinn

- Editors: Kathy Wilkes, Riva Hocherman
- Author: Howard Zinn, Paul Buhle, Mike Konopacki, Dave Wagner, Kathy Wilkes
- Illustrator: Mike Konopacki
- Language: English
- Series: The American Empire Project
- Subject: American history, American politics, American foreign policy, American economics, biography
- Publisher: Metropolitan Books
- Publication date: January 1, 2008
- Publication place: United States
- Media type: Print (Paperback)
- Pages: 288 pp
- ISBN: 1-84529-831-4
- OCLC: 163625223

A People's History of American Empire is a 2008 graphic history by Howard Zinn, Mike Konopacki, and Paul Buhle. The book combines material from Zinn's history book A People's History of the United States and his autobiography You Can't Be Neutral on a Moving Train with new material from other sources, most notably George Lipsitz's A Rainbow at Midnight: Labor and Culture in the 1940s and Jim Zwick's Mark Twain's Weapons of Satire: Anti-Imperialist Writings on the Philippine-American War. Various historic subjects are covered as well as Zinn's own history of involvement in activism and historic events. The book was the last of Zinn's books that was published within his lifetime.

The book's story is based around a frame story of Zinn giving a speech at an anti-war rally. Through it, he talks about past acts of imperialism by the U.S. government, as well as acts of resistance to it both inside and outside of the country. During the story, comparisons are made between the American government's past actions and recent ones, often appearing in boxes marked as "Zinnformation".

== Overview ==
The Prologue begins with Zinn writing an article on his typewriter about his reaction to the September 11, 2001 attacks and his anger at President George W. Bush for reacting in a way that Zinn saw as ahistorical (this article was "The Old Way of Thinking", which appeared in Progressive Magazine). He goes on to criticize the military actions in the War in Afghanistan that led to the deaths of civilians. The chapter ends with Zinn giving a speech at an anti-war rally, which becomes a speech on America's past acts of imperialism.

Chapter I, "The Internal Empire", starts by covering the Wounded Knee Massacre, narrated by survivor Black Elk. It goes on to cover the Robber Barons (specifically J. P. Morgan, John D. Rockefeller, Jay Gould, and George Pullman); strikes during 1892 such as the Copper Miners Strike, the New Orleans General Strike, the Railroad Switchmen's Strike, and the Steelworkers' Strike; the 1894 Railroad Strike against the Pullman Palace Car Company and Eugene V. Debs involvement in it; the Monroe Doctrine and the Open Door Policy; the invasion of Hawaii in 1893; and the 103 interventions carried out in other countries by the U.S. between 1798 and 1895, including Japan (1853–54), Nicaragua (1853–54), Uruguay (1855), Argentina (1853–54), and Angola (1860).

Chapter II, "The Spanish–American War", is about the events of the Spanish–American War. Various people who were involved in the events of the war and those leading up to it are discussed, such as Antonio Maceo Grajales, Máximo Gómez, José Martí, Clemencia Arango. Other topics covered include the media hype for the war created by William Randolph Hearst's New York Journal and Joseph Pulitzer's New York World (which led to the concept of yellow journalism); the explosion of the USS Maine, which the two newspapers blamed on the Spanish; the actions of labor unions, which supported the Cuban rebels but not U.S. intervention; the Black 25th Infantry and its experience with racism at the hands of the Rough Riders; the poisoning of soldiers by spoiled meat packaged by Armour and Co.; and the takeover of Cuba by the U.S.

Chapter III, "The Invasion of the Philippines", covers the events of the Philippine–American War. It begins with explaining how the end of the Spanish–American War resulted in the U.S. gaining the former Spanish colonies of Cuba, Puerto Rico, Guam, and the Philippines, and explains that William McKinley believed he had to take over the Philippines from its native people in order to "civilize and Christianize" them. Afterwards, it shows the struggles of Emilio Aguinaldo in trying to keep control of the Philippines for its own people. Other topics and individuals covered include George Dewey, Fermín Jáudenes, Fort San Antonio de Abad, the Benevolent Assimilation Proclamation, the battle of Santa Mesa, William Jennings Bryan, Albert J. Beveridge, Henry M. Turner, W. E. B. Du Bois, Littletown Waller, the shootings at Samar, Elihu Root, Theodore Roosevelt, the use of the water cure in the war, Leonard Wood, the Moro Crater massacre, Mark Twain, and the Anti-Imperialist League.

Chapter IV, "War is the Health of the State", covers World War I and the events leading into it. It begins with discussing how the U.S. government used its military power to protect American business interests both within the country and abroad during such events as the aftermath of the Mexican Revolution and the Ludlow Massacre. Zinn goes on to explain how the U.S. and European countries entered into World War I to gain imperial power over Africa, the Balkans, Alsace-Lorraine, and the Middle-East, while the U.S. itself also entered to increase patriotism and to weaken the growing popular interest in socialism. Other topics and individuals covered include Woodrow Wilson, Randolph Bourne, Robert Lansing, Bernard Baruch, William Gibbs McAdoo, the Lusitania, the Sykes–Picot Agreement, the Conscription Act of 1917, the Espionage Act of 1917, Champ Clark, the American Protective League, the Industrial Workers of the World, Camp Funston, Sheldon W. Smith, Leavenworth Prison, Kate Richards O'Hare, Alice Paul, the National Woman's Party, and Emma Goldman.

Chapter V, "Growing Up Class-Conscious", covers Zinn's childhood and teenage years. Zinn begins the chapter by telling about how his community worked together to get through the Great Depression and their reaction to the execution of Sacco and Vanzetti. He goes on to tell of how he began to understand poverty through reading the works of Charles Dickens, working with his father as a waiter, and getting involved in a demonstration with some of the communists in his neighborhood. These led to Zinn becoming class-conscious and abandoning his liberal views for radical ones.

Chapter VI, "World War II: A People's War?" covers some key events in World War II and Zinn's service/perspective. He was a ship fitter in the Brooklyn Navy Yard and while a United States Army Air Corps bombarder, married Roslyn Shechter. He notes racial segregation on board his transport ship. He writes that it was the most popular war the US ever fought, with widespread support across many classes of people, but was launched with political deceptions and policy driven by corporate interests, such as: the US claimed Pearl Harbor a sneak attack but records two weeks earlier show that we anticipated war with Japan; Franklin D. Roosevelt (FDR) claimed German submarines launched unprovoked attacks but the US had really been waging undeclared war with Germany in the Lend-Lease program as an Arsenal of Democracy contrary to Neutrality Acts of 1930s. By 1941 there were over 4,000 strikes, more than any time since 1919. FDR had troops seize mines in a strike May 1943. 6,000 war resistors, three times as many as World War I, went to prison.

Unions enrolled 1.25M new African-American workers and this led to hate strikes such as in 1943 at Packard. The military demanded that Charles Richard Drew, an African-American doctor who invented blood banks, segregate blood by race and after refusing, they fired him from an Army/Navy blood drive. FDR signed Executive Order 9066 leading arrest of every US west coast Japanese. The US extends the Open Door Policy from Asia into Europe, marking an increased involvement in European affairs.

Chapter VII, "The Cool War"

Chapter VIII, "Children of the Empire"

Chapter IX, "Land of Burning Children"

Chapter X, "The Same Rotting Barrel"

Chapter XI, " Resurgence of Empire"

Chapter XII, "Covert Action and Reaction"
