= Murder of Michal Sela =

2019 murder in Israel

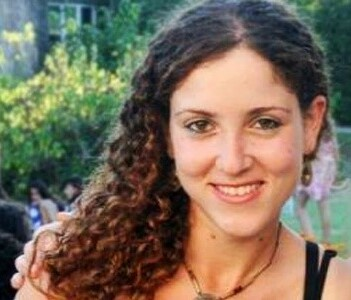
Michal Sela

Michal Sela (Hebrew: מיכל סלה) was an Israeli social worker who worked with at-risk youth in Jerusalem. After she was murdered by her husband in 2019, she has been featured in public education and awareness campaigns, and her sister Lili Ben Ami founded the Michal Sela Forum, a nonprofit organization focused on the development of technology and services to prevent domestic violence and abuse.

== Murder ==
Sela was stabbed to death on October 2, 2019, at her home in Motza. In 2021, her husband Eliran Malul was convicted of murder. In December 2021, Malul was sentenced to life in prison.

Sela and Malul had a daughter who was eight months old at the time of Sela's death. Family members of Sela publicly advocated for an amendment to the Guardianship Law in Israel to automatically remove guardianship rights for the children of parents who murder or attempt to murder the other parent in domestic abuse situations. The amendment was enacted in 2021 and resulted in the removal of guardianship rights from Eliran Malul.

== Victim ==
Sela was born in Moshav Beit Zeit, the fourth of six children born to Daniela and Raphael Sela. She earned her Master of Social Work degree from the Paul Baerwald School of Social Work and Social Welfare at the Hebrew University of Jerusalem a few days before her death. Sela worked with at-risk youth as a social worker in Jerusalem.

== Legacy ==
Sela was one of the victims featured in the installation titled She's Gone, which displays the clothing of women murdered by their partners, and was shown in Tel Aviv in 2019 as well as in the United Nations office in Geneva in 2022. In 2021, an artificial version of Sela appeared in a video created by artificial intelligence as part of an Israeli public education campaign against domestic violence.

=== Michal Sela Forum ===
In 2020, Lili Ben Ami, her sister, founded the nonprofit Michal Sela Forum (MSF) to develop technology to help prevent domestic violence.

In 2020, MSF hosted a Safe@Home hackathon focused on developing technology. Following the hackathon, MSF continued an accelerator phase of the project.

In 2021, MSF co-sponsored a United Nations event titled "Terror at Home: Fighting Domestic Violence with Innovation and Technology" and received a $300,000 grant from Google.org to continue developing technology after the 2021 Safe@Home hackathon. In 2021, the Forum participated in a collaboration between Israel and Australia titled Preventing Domestic Violence through Innovation and Technology. MSF has also developed a defense dog project, to distribute trained "Michal Sela dogs" to women threatened with harm.

In 2022, MSF partnered with Meta to develop the Hebrew-language interface for technology designed to reduce the spread of revenge porn. Also in 2022, MSF partnered with the Ministry of Public Security in Israel to develop and deploy a pilot program to protect women and children at risk of harm, including a Sayeret Michal ("Michal Special Forces") security program and services that include trained defense dogs.
