= Mike Konopacki =

American cartoonist

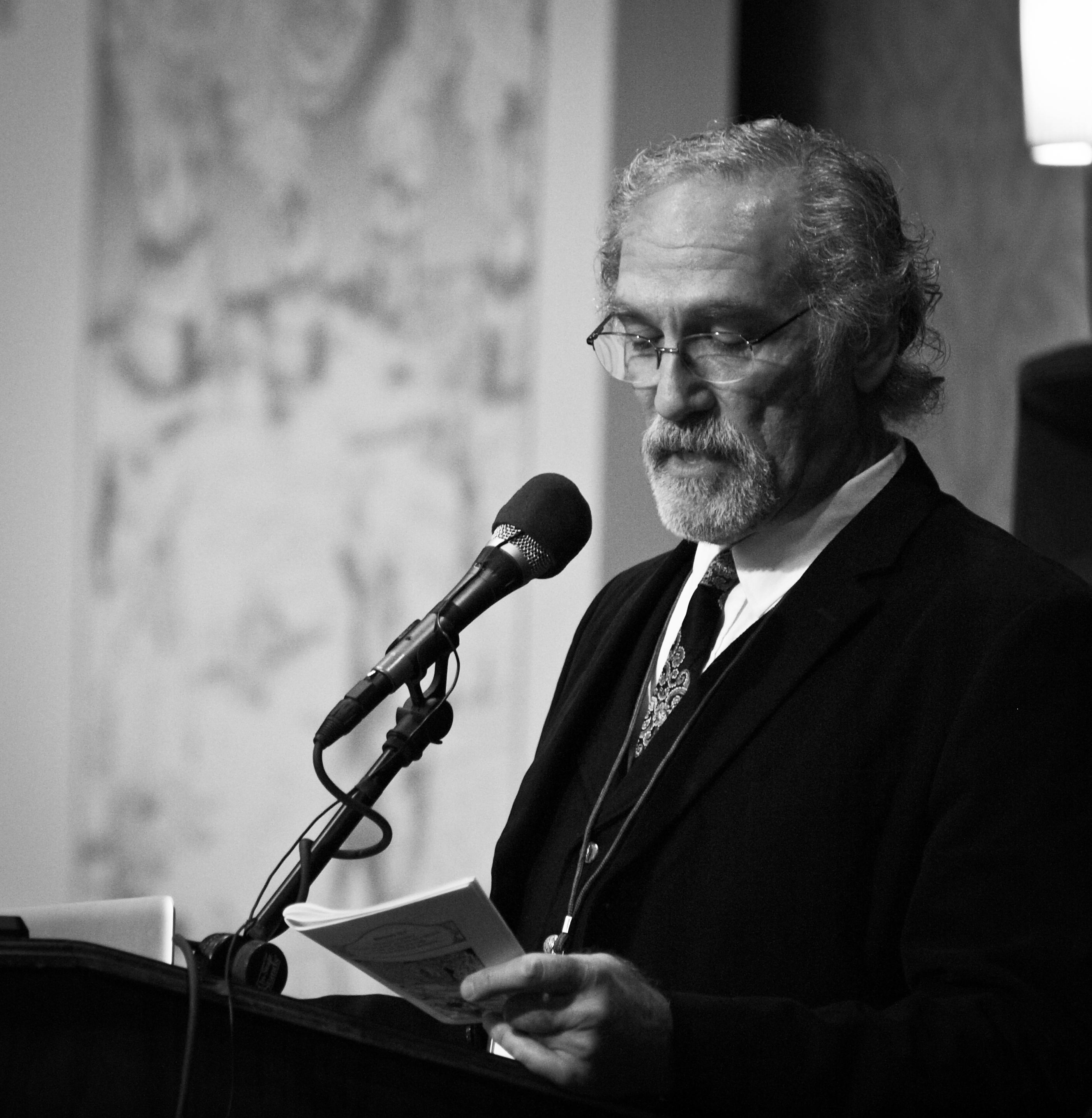
Konopacki in 2010

Mike Konopacki (born c. 1951) is an American political cartoonist from Wisconsin, specializing in labor issues.

== Background and early career ==
A 1974 graduate of the University of Wisconsin–Madison (B.A. in political science), Konopacki began cartooning for the Madison Press Connection in 1977, as the successor to Pete Wagner. Konopacki's Press Connection cartoon originals are archived at the Wisconsin State Historical Society.

== Syndication ==
After the Connection went bankrupt in 1980, Konopacki began syndicating his work through the labor news service Press Associates, Inc. In 1983 he and Gary Huck (a cartoonist for the United Electrical, Radio and Machine Workers of America) created their own syndication service, Huck/Konopacki Labor Cartoons. Huck and Konopacki have published six collections of cartoons: Bye! American, THEM, MAD in USA, Working Class Hero, Two Headed Space Alien Shrinks Labor Movement and American Dread.

=== Archives of the syndicate ===
The business records of the early years of the partnership are archived in the Elmer Holmes Bobst Library's Tamiment Library and Robert F. Wagner Labor Archives.

== Other work ==
Konopacki has created comics on a number of topics, including union organizing, welfare reform, the World Bank, and the World Trade Organization, often in collaboration with writer Alec Dubro. He animated the 1998 video Global Village or Global Pillage, narrated by Ed Asner. In 2005, Konopacki illustrated the section, "Wobblies in the '60s" in Wobblies!: A Graphic History of the Industrial Workers of the World. In collaboration with Howard Zinn and historian Paul Buhle, he co-wrote and illustrated A People's History of American Empire, a graphic novel adaptation of Zinn's A People's History of the United States

== Personal life ==
Konopacki lives in Madison, Wisconsin. He has earned his M.A. (2009) and M.F.A. (2010) degrees from UW-Madison's School of Art. His MFA exhibit was titled, One Nation Under God.
