= Liberty Square Blueprint =

The Liberty Square Blueprint was an Occupy Wall Street manifesto consisting in a collection of loosely defined goals authored by about 250 protesters. It was started around the beginning of October 2011 as a wiki style document. As of October 18, 2011, the Blueprint had 11 core visions including:

- embracing open-source technology,
- ending all wars,
- eliminating "discrimination and prejudice," and
- reappropriating "our business structures and culture, putting people and our Earth before profit.

It also had specific goals for New York City.

Supporters of the Liberty Square Blueprint saw it as an alternative to the 99 Percent Declaration which they regarded as too specific and short term.
