= The People Speak (film) =

- DVD cover
- Directed by: Howard Zinn; Chris Moore; Anthony Arnove
- Written by: Howard Zinn; Anthony Arnove
- Based on: A People's History of the United States by: Howard Zinn; Voices of a People's History of the United States; by Howard Zinn; Anthony Arnove
- Produced by: Dan Abrams; Ara Katz; Art Spigel; David G. Johnson; Craig Roessler; Jesse Singer; Carolyn Mugar; Jodie Evans; Max Palevsky
- Music by: Pieter A. Schlosser
- Release dates: February 2009 (MoMA); December 13, 2009
- Country: United States
- Language: English

The People Speak is a 2009 American documentary feature film that uses dramatic and musical performances of the letters, diaries, and speeches of everyday Americans. The film gives voice to those who, by insisting on equality and justice, spoke up for social change throughout U.S. history and also illustrates the relevance of this to today's society.

The film is narrated by historian Howard Zinn and is based on his books A People's History of the United States (1980) and, with Anthony Arnove, Voices of a People's History of the United States (2004).

The People Speak was directed by Chris Moore, Arnove, and Zinn.

== Production ==
The film was shot on location in Boston, in front of live audiences at Emerson's Cutler Majestic Theatre in January 2008 and at Malibu Performing Arts Center, Malibu.

== Cast ==
- Allison Moorer
- Benjamin Bratt
- Bob Dylan
- Bruce Springsteen
- Chris Robinson
- Christina Kirk
- Danny Glover
- Darryl "D.M.C." McDaniels
- David Strathairn
- Don Cheadle
- Eddie Vedder
- Harris Yulin
- Jasmine Guy
- John Legend
- Josh Brolin
- Kathleen Chalfant
- Kerry Washington
- Lupe Fiasco
- Marisa Tomei
- Martín Espada
- Matt Damon
- Michael Ealy
- Mike O'Malley
- Morgan Freeman
- P!nk
- Q'orianka Kilcher
- Reg E. Cathey
- Rich Robinson
- Rosario Dawson
- Sandra Oh
- Sean Penn
- Staceyann Chin
- Viggo Mortensen
- Jon-Claire Lee

== Screenings ==
Clips from the film were screened at the Democratic National Convention in August 2008 and at the 2008 Toronto International Film Festival in September 2008. The movie opened MoMA's Documentary Fortnight in New York in February 2009 and was screened on April 16, 2009 at the Atlanta Film Festival. In November 2009, the movie premiere was held at Jazz at Lincoln Center in New York.

The People Speak premiered on The History Channel on Sunday, December 13, 2009.

== Reviews ==
The film was well received by the critics. The Los Angeles Times described it as "Striking, exhilarating... the performances are thrilling".

USA Today reported Damon as saying: "This is the perfect format for a history lesson. You're getting the actual historical text verbatim, so there's no spin, performed by these great actors. History is intimidating. There's so much to know. If I could go back to college again, I would be a history major." According to the newspaper, Springsteen taped at his ranch in New Jersey while Brolin was at work and Brolin said: "They ended up spending five or six hours. And I got this little card from Bruce Springsteen that said: 'Josh, thank you so much for making my childhood dream come true. I had the greatest day of my life.'"

== Soundtrack ==
The People Speak soundtrack on Verve Records features Bruce Springsteen, who performs with just a guitar and harmonica in his New Jersey home recording studio, and John Legend who sings solo backed by a piano at a Boston theatre, as well as others (including Taj Mahal, Allison Moorer, The Black Crowes' Rich Robinson and X's Exene Cervenka and John Doe) at the Malibu Performing Arts Center, where they perform both vintage and recent protest-music classics.

Springsteen reprises the John Steinbeck/Woody Guthrie-inspired "The Ghost of Tom Joad" from his 1995 album of the same name; Dylan sings Guthrie's "Do Re Mi"; and two early Dylan songs "Masters Of War" and "Only A Pawn In Their Game" are performed by Eddie Vedder and Rich Robinson, respectively.

One of the best-known songs of the Great Depression, "Brother, Can You Spare a Dime?", is sung by Moorer; Newman is at his piano for "Sail Away", the title track from his 1972 album; Legend performs Marvin Gaye's 1970s anthem "What's Going On"; Mahal plays "Blues With A Feeling"; and Cervenka and Doe revive X's roots rocker "See How We Are" from 1987. More recent protest songs are Fiasco's "American Terrorist", first heard on his 2006 debut album; Pink's "Dear Mr. President," heard on her album of that same year; and Browne's "The Drums Of War", which debuted on his 2008 album Time the Conqueror.

The soundtrack, on Verve Records, features new songs by Allison Moorer, Bob Dylan, Bruce Springsteen, Eddie Vedder, Exene Cervenka, Jackson Browne, John Doe, John Legend, Lupe Fiasco, P!nk, Randy Newman, Rich Robinson, and Taj Mahal.

== The People Speak – International ==
=== The People Speak UK ===
Colin Firth developed the British version of the film together with History UK and the film's US producers Anthony Arnove and Chris Moore. Like the original, the UK version draws on writings that have influenced British history and it includes performances by British screen and stage actors. Performers include Ian McKellen, Joss Stone, Saffron Burrows, Mark Strong, Celia Imrie, Noel Clarke, Sir Ben Kingsley, Mark Steel, Stephen Rea and others.

The documentary aired on History UK on October 31, 2010.

=== The People Speak Australia ===
The Australian version was filmed by Foxtel and The History Channel Australia on 9 July 2012 at Carriageworks in Redfern, Sydney in front of a live audience. It was produced by WTFN Entertainment and directed by Phillip Tanner. It was aired on The History Channel Australia on 2 December 2012.

Australian performers include Alex Dimitriades, Asher Keddie, Chris Haywood, Claudia Karvan, Dan Wyllie, David Wenham, Jack Thompson, Madeleine Madden, John Jarratt, Leah Purcell, Magda Szubanski, Rebecca Gibney, Ryan Kwanten, Sam Worthington. There were musical performances by Christine Anu, Julia Stone and Tex Perkins. Narration was by Thomas Keneally.

== The People Speak – Education ==
An educational version of The People Speak is in production, in association with Voices of a People's History of the United States.
