= Linor Deutsch =

Israeli social and political activist

- לינור דויטש
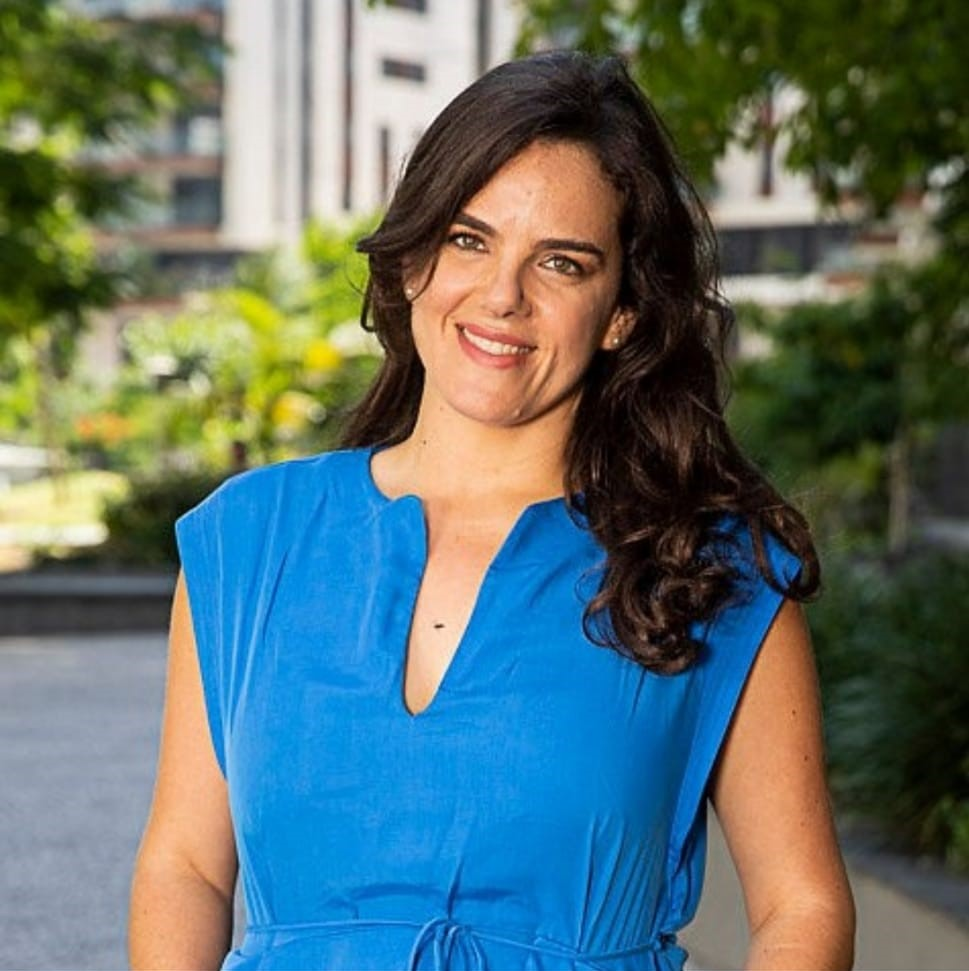
- Born: September 27, 1982 (age 43); Be'er Sheva, Israel
- Occupation: lawyer
- Known for: social activisim; political activism; lobbying

Linor Deutsch (Hebrew: לינור דויטש; born September 27, 1982) is a public representative, co-founder and CEO of Lobby 99. She is a lawyer by profession, a feminist and an activist. A graduate of Unit 8200, an expert in regulation and political consulting, she holds a BA in Law and Political Science and a MA in gender studies from Tel Aviv University. She was selected for the "100 Most Influential People" list in 2017, 2018, 2019, 2020 and 2021 and is the recipient of the "Quality of Government" award for 2019. In addition, she was included in the activist lists of Lady Globes and Calcalist.

== Biography ==
Linor Deutsch was born on September 27, 1982 in Be'er Sheva and grew up in Gan Yavne. In the army, she served in Unit 8200. After the army, she studied at Tel Aviv University, where she graduated with a bachelor's degree in law and political science and a master's degree in gender studies.

From 2009 to 2011, she was a parliamentary assistant to MK Shai Hermesh (Kadima). She then served as Deputy Director of Regulation and Attorney General at the Farmers' Association in Israel from 2011 to 2015, and worked as a parliamentary assistant and political advisor in the Knesset.

Deutsch retired and founded the "Lobby 99" initiative along with Yaya Fink where she served as the first public lobbyist. The organization is funded by public donations under standing orders.

She writes for Haaretz, the blog section of The Times of Israel, and Globes.

In May 2023, she participated in the documentary television program "Medurot Hashvatim" (Tribal Campfire) on Kan 11.

== Awards and recognition ==
She won the 2019 Knighthood for Quality Government in the category of social-public struggle from the Movement for Quality Government.

== Personal life ==
Linor Deutsch is married and a mother of two. She lives in Tel Aviv.
