= Voices of a People's History of the United States =

2004 book by Howard Zinn

- Editor: Howard Zinn, Anthony Arnove
- Publisher: Seven Stories Press
- Publication date: 2004
- ISBN: 978-1583229163
- Preceded by: A People's History of the United States

Voices of a People's History of the United States (ISBN 978-1583229163) is an anthology edited by Howard Zinn and Anthony Arnove. First released in 2004 by Seven Stories Press, Voices is the primary source companion to Zinn's A People's History of the United States. The book parallels A People's History in structure and is made up of various primary sources with short introductions to those sources.

Seven Stories Press released a tenth-anniversary edition with several added chapters in November 2014.

In the introduction, Zinn explains his motivation for the book:

I want to point out that people who seem to have no power, whether working people, people of color, or women—once they organize and protest and create movements—have a voice no government can suppress.

Among the writings, speeches, poems, songs and other sources included in the book are selections by Chief Joseph, Frederick Douglass, Henry David Thoreau, John Brown, Mary Harris "Mother" Jones, Upton Sinclair, Emma Goldman, Joe Hill, Eugene V. Debs, Langston Hughes, John Steinbeck, Malcolm X, Alice Walker, Martin Luther King Jr., Allen Ginsberg, Assata Shakur, Angela Davis, Leonard Peltier, Noam Chomsky, César Chávez, Abbie Hoffman, Mumia Abu-Jamal, Julia Butterfly Hill and many others.

== The People Speak ==
In 2009, the documentary film The People Speak was released. Narrated by Zinn, the film uses dramatic and musical performances of the letters, diaries, and speeches of Americans, the historically famous and the everyday, based on Zinn's and Arnove’s anthology as well as A People's History of the United States.

The People Speak was produced by Matt Damon, Josh Brolin, Chris Moore, Arnove, and Zinn, co-directed by Moore, Arnove and Zinn, and features dramatic and musical performances by well-known American actors, musicians and poets.
