= A People's History of the United States =

1980 history book by Howard Zinn

- 2003 hardcover edition
- Author: Howard Zinn
- Language: English
- Series: A People's History
- Subject: American history, American politics, American foreign policy, American economics
- Publisher: Harper & Row; HarperCollins
- Publication date: 1980 (1st edition); 2009 (most recent edition)
- Publication place: United States
- Media type: Print
- Pages: 729 pp (2003 edition)
- OCLC: 50622172
- LC Class: E178 .Z75 2003

A People's History of the United States is a 1980 nonfiction book (updated in 2003) by American historian and political scientist Howard Zinn. In the book, Zinn presented what he considered to be a different side of history from the more traditional "fundamental nationalist glorification of country". Zinn portrays a side of American history that can largely be seen as the exploitation and manipulation of the majority by rigged systems that hugely favor a small aggregate of elite rulers from across the orthodox political parties.

A People's History has been assigned as reading in many high schools and colleges across the United States. It has also resulted in a change in the focus of historical work, which now includes stories that previously were ignored. The book was a runner-up in 1980 for the National Book Award. It frequently has been revised, with the most recent edition covering events through 2002. In 2003, Zinn was awarded the Prix des Amis du Monde Diplomatique for the French version of this book Une histoire populaire des États-Unis. More than four million copies have been sold, and sales of the book annually grew over the 30 years between 1980 and 2010.

The first edition, published by Harper & Row in 1980, had an initial print run of 5,000 hardcover copies. The book subsequently gained a wider readership through paperback editions and word of mouth.

In a 1998 interview, Zinn said he had set "quiet revolution" as his goal for writing A People's History: "Not a revolution in the classical sense of a seizure of power, but rather from people beginning to take power from within the institutions. In the workplace, the workers would take power to control the conditions of their lives." In 2004, Zinn edited a primary source companion volume with Anthony Arnove, titled Voices of a People's History of the United States.

A People's History of the United States has been criticized by various pundits and fellow historians. Chris Beneke and Randall J. Stephens, stated that the book contains blatant omissions of important historical episodes, uncritical reliance on biased sources, and failures to examine opposing views. Conversely, others have defended Zinn and the accuracy and intellectual integrity of his work.

== Overview ==
In a letter responding to a 2007 critical review of his A Young People's History of the United States (a release of the title for younger readers) in The New York Times Book Review, Zinn wrote:

My history ... describes the inspiring struggle of those who have fought slavery and racism (Frederick Douglass, William Lloyd Garrison, Fannie Lou Hamer, Bob Moses), of the labor organizers who have led strikes for the rights of working people (Big Bill Haywood, Mother Jones, César Chávez), of the socialists and others who have protested war and militarism (Eugene V. Debs, Helen Keller, the Rev. Daniel Berrigan, Cindy Sheehan). My hero is not Theodore Roosevelt, who loved war and congratulated a general after a massacre of Filipino villagers at the turn of the century, but Mark Twain, who denounced the massacre and satirized imperialism. I want young people to understand that ours is a beautiful country, but it has been taken over by men who have no respect for human rights or constitutional liberties. Our people are basically decent and caring, and our highest ideals are expressed in the Declaration of Independence, which says that all of us have an equal right to "life, liberty, and the pursuit of happiness." The history of our country, I point out in my book, is a striving, against corporate robber barons and war makers, to make those ideals a reality—and all of us, of whatever age, can find immense satisfaction in becoming part of that.

=== Columbus to independence ===
Chapter 1, "Columbus, the Indians, and Human Progress" covers early Native American civilization in North America and the Bahamas, the enslavement committed by the crew of Christopher Columbus (whom Zinn accused of genocide), and incidents of violent colonization by early settlers. Instead of restating the same history that has been presented for centuries, Zinn states that he prefers to tell history from the perspective of the Arawaks, which many people are not familiar with. He describes the purpose of Columbus' expedition and his brutality towards the natives after his arrival. Not only does he use firsthand account of witnesses to Columbus' presence in the islands, he also provides statistics of native casualties to present this different side of history. Topics include the Arawaks, Bartolomé de las Casas, the Aztecs, Hernán Cortés, Pizarro, Powhatan, the Pequot, the Narragansett, Metacom, King Philip's War, and the Iroquois.

Chapter 2, "Drawing the Color Line" addresses the slave trade and servitude of poor White people in the Thirteen Colonies. Zinn writes of the methods by which he says racism was created artificially in order to enforce the economic system. He argues that racism is not natural because there are recorded instances of camaraderie and cooperation between enslaved Blacks and White servants in escaping from and in opposing their subjugation.

Chapter 3, "Persons of Mean and Vile Condition" describes Bacon's Rebellion (1676), the economic conditions of the poor in the colonies, and opposition to their poverty. Zinn uses Nathaniel Bacon's rebellion to assert that "class lines hardened through the colonial period".

Chapter 4, "Tyranny Is Tyranny" covers the movement for "leveling" (economic equality) in the colonies and the causes of the American Revolution. Zinn argues that the Founding Fathers agitated for war to distract the people from their own economic problems and to stop popular movements, a strategy that he claims the country's leaders would continue to use in the future.

Chapter 5, "A Kind of Revolution" covers the war and resistance to participating in war, the effects on the Native American people, and the continued inequalities in the new United States. When the land of veterans of the Revolutionary War was seized for non-payment of taxes, it led to instances of resistance to the government, as in the case of Shays' Rebellion. Zinn notes that "Charles Beard warned us that governments—including the government of the United States—are not neutral ... they represent the dominant economic interests, and ... their constitutions are intended to serve these interests."

=== Independence to the robber barons ===
Chapter 6, "The Intimately Oppressed" describes resistance to inequalities in the lives of women in the early years of the U.S. Zinn tells the stories of women who resisted the status quo, including Polly Baker, Anne Hutchinson, Mary Dyer, Amelia Bloomer, Catharine Beecher, Emma Willard, Harriot Kezia Hunt, Elizabeth Blackwell, Lucy Stone, Elizabeth Cady Stanton, Margaret Fuller, Sarah Grimké, Angelina Grimké, Dorothea Dix, Frances Wright, Lucretia Mott, and Sojourner Truth.

If you look through high school textbooks and elementary school textbooks in American history, you will find Andrew Jackson the frontiersman, soldier, democrat, man of the people—not Jackson the slaveholder, land speculator, executioner of dissident soldiers, exterminator of Indians.

— Howard Zinn,
A People's History of the United States

Chapter 7, "As Long As Grass Grows or Water Runs" discusses 19th century conflicts between the U.S. government and Native Americans (such as the Seminole Wars) and Indian removal, especially during the administrations of Andrew Jackson and Martin Van Buren.

Chapter 8, "We Take Nothing by Conquest, Thank God" describes the Mexican–American War. Zinn writes that President James Polk agitated for war for the purpose of imperialism. Zinn argues that the war was unpopular, but that some newspapers of that era misrepresented the popular sentiment.

Chapter 9, "Slavery Without Submission, Emancipation Without Freedom" addresses slave rebellions, the abolition movement, the Civil War, and the effect of these events on African-Americans. Zinn writes that the large-scale violence of the war was used to end slavery instead of the small-scale violence of the rebellions because the latter may have expanded beyond anti-slavery, resulting in a movement against the capitalist system. He writes that the war could limit the freedom granted to African-Americans by allowing the government control over how that freedom was gained.

Chapter 10, "The Other Civil War", covers the Anti-Rent movement, the Dorr Rebellion, the Flour Riot of 1837, the New York City draft riots, the Molly Maguires, the rise of labor unions, the Lowell girls movement, and other class struggles centered around the various depressions of the 19th century. He describes the abuse of government power by corporations and the efforts by workers to resist those abuses.

Chapter 11, "Robber Barons and Rebels" covers the rise of industrial corporations such as the railroads and banks and their transformation into the nation's dominant institutions, with corruption resulting in both industry and government. Also covered are the popular movements and individuals that opposed corruption, such as the Knights of Labor, Edward Bellamy, the Socialist Labor Party, the Haymarket martyrs, the Homestead strikers, Alexander Berkman, Emma Goldman, Eugene V. Debs, the American Railway Union, the Farmers' Alliance, and the Populist Party.

=== 20th century ===
Chapter 12, "The Empire and the People", covers American imperialism during the Spanish–American War and the Philippine–American War, as well as in other lands such as Hawaii, Guam, and Puerto Rico. The Teller Amendment is discussed. Zinn portrays the wars as racist and imperialist and opposed by large segments of the American people.

Chapter 13, "The Socialist Challenge", covers the rise of socialism and anarchism as popular political ideologies in the United States. Covered in the chapter are the American Federation of Labor (which Zinn argues provided too exclusive of a union for non-white, female, and unskilled workers; Zinn argues in Chapter 24 that this changes in the 1990s), Industrial Workers of the World (IWW), Mary Harris "Mother" Jones, Joe Hill, the Socialist Labor Party, W. E. B. Du Bois, and the Progressive Party (which Zinn portrays as driven by fear of radicalism).

Chapter 14, "War Is the Health of the State" covers World War I and the anti-war movement that happened during it, which was met with the heavily enforced Espionage Act of 1917. Zinn argues that the United States entered the war in order to expand its foreign markets and economic influence.

Chapter 15, "Self-Help in Hard Times" covers the government's campaign to destroy the IWW, and the factors leading to the Great Depression. Zinn states that, despite popular belief, the 1920s were not a time of prosperity, and the problems of the Depression were simply the chronic problems of the poor extended to the rest of the society. Also covered is the Communist Party's attempts to help the poor during the Depression. He criticizes some aspects of Franklin Delano Roosevelt's New Deal: "From the first, the NRA was dominated by big business and served their interests." According to Zinn, the New Deal was aimed mainly at stabilizing the economy and "secondly at giving enough help to the lower classes to keep them from turning a rebellion into a real revolution".

Chapter 16, "A People's War?", covers World War II, opposition to it, and the effects of the war on the people. Zinn, a veteran of the war himself, notes that "it was the most popular war the US ever fought", but states that this support may have been manufactured through the institutions of American society. He cites various instances of opposition to fighting (in some cases greater than those during World War I) as proof. Zinn also argues that the US's true intention was not fighting against systematic racism, since the US had this itself, such as with the Jim Crow laws (leading to opposition to the war from African-Americans). In accordance with American revisionist historian Gar Alperovitz, another argument made by Zinn is that the atomic bombings of Hiroshima and Nagasaki were not necessary, as the U.S. government had already known that the Japanese were considering surrender beforehand, and it was "most anxious to get the Japanese affair over with before the Russians got in". Other subjects from WWII covered include Japanese American internment and the bombing of Dresden. The chapter continues into the Cold War, which Zinn writes was used by the U.S. government to increase control over the American people (for instance, eliminating such radical elements as the Communist Party) and at the same time create a state of permanent war, which allowed for the creation of the military–industrial complex. Zinn believes this was possible because both conservatives and liberals willingly worked together in the name of anti-Communism. Also covered is US involvement in the Greek Civil War, the Korean War, Julius and Ethel Rosenberg, the Marshall Plan and the Cuban Revolution.

Chapter 17, "'Or Does It Explode?'" (named after a line from Langston Hughes's poem "Harlem" from "Montage of a Dream Deferred", referred to as "Lenox Avenue Mural" by Zinn), covers the Civil Rights Movement. Zinn argues that the government began making reforms against discrimination (although without making fundamental changes) for the sake of changing its international image, but often did not enforce the laws that it passed. Zinn also argues that while nonviolent tactics may have been required for Southern civil rights activists, militant actions (such as those proposed by Malcolm X) were needed to solve the problems of black ghettos. Also covered is the involvement of the Communist Party in the movement, the Congress of Racial Equality, the Student Nonviolent Coordinating Committee, the Freedom Riders, COINTELPRO, and the Black Panther Party.

Chapter 18, "The Impossible Victory: Vietnam", covers the Vietnam War and resistance to it. Zinn argues that America was fighting a war that it could not win, as the Vietnamese people were in favor of the government of Ho Chi Minh and opposed the regime of Ngo Dinh Diem, thus allowing them to keep morale high. Meanwhile, the American military's morale was very low, as many soldiers were put off by the atrocities which they were made to take part in, such as the My Lai massacre. Zinn also tries to dispel the popular belief that opposition to the war was mainly among college students and middle-class intellectuals, using statistics from the era to show higher opposition from the working class. Zinn argues that the troops themselves also opposed the war, citing desertions and refusals to go to war, as well as movements such as Vietnam Veterans Against the War. Also covered is the US invasions of Laos and Cambodia, Agent Orange, the Pentagon Papers, Ron Kovic, and raids on draft boards.

Chapter 19, "Surprises", covers other movements that happened during the 1960s, such as second-wave feminism, the prison reform/prison abolition movement, the Native American rights movement, and the counterculture. People and events from the feminist movement covered include Betty Friedan's The Feminine Mystique, Women's International Terrorist Conspiracy from Hell, Patricia Robinson, the National Domestic Workers Union, National Organization for Women, Roe v. Wade, Susan Brownmiller's Against Our Will, and Our Bodies, Ourselves. People and events from the prison movement covered include George Jackson, the Attica Prison riots, and Jerry Sousa. People and events from the Native American rights movement covered include the National Indian Youth Council, Sid Mills, Akwesasne Notes, Indians of All Tribes, the First Convocation of American Indian Scholars, Frank James, the American Indian Movement, and the Wounded Knee incident. People and events from the counterculture covered include Pete Seeger, Bob Dylan, Joan Baez, Malvina Reynolds, Jessica Mitford's The American Way of Death, Jonathan Kozol, George Dennison, and Ivan Illich.

Chapter 20, "The Seventies: Under Control?", covers political corruption and American disillusion with the government during the 1970s. Zinn argues that the resignation of President Richard Nixon and the exposure of crimes committed by the CIA and FBI during the decade were done by the government in order to regain support from the American people without making fundamental changes to the system. According to Zinn, Gerald Ford's presidency continued the same basic policies of the Nixon administration. Other topics covered include protests against the Honeywell Corporation, Angela Davis, Committee to Re-elect the President, the Watergate scandal, International Telephone and Telegraph's involvement in the 1973 Chilean coup d'état, the Mayagüez incident, Project MKUltra, the Church Committee, the Pike Committee, the Trilateral Commission's The Governability of Democracies, and the People's Bi-Centennial.

Chapter 21, "Carter-Reagan-Bush: The Bipartisan Consensus", covers the Jimmy Carter, Ronald Reagan, and George H. W. Bush administrations and their effects on both the American people and foreign countries. Zinn argues that the Democratic and Republican parties keep the government essentially the same, maintaining policies favorable for corporations and a militant foreign policy, no matter which party was in power. Zinn uses similarities among the three administrations' methods to argue for this. Other topics covered include the Fairness Doctrine, the Indonesian invasion of East Timor, Noam Chomsky, global warming, Roy Benavidez, the Trident submarine, the Star Wars program, the Sandinista National Liberation Front, the Iran–Contra affair, the War Powers Act, U.S. invasion of Lebanon during the Lebanese Civil War, the Invasion of Grenada, Óscar Romero, the El Mozote massacre, the 1986 Bombing of Libya, the collapse of the Soviet Union, the United States invasion of Panama, and the Gulf War.

Chapter 22, "The Unreported Resistance", covers several movements that happened during the Carter-Reagan-Bush years that were ignored by much of the mainstream media. Topics covered include the anti-nuclear movement, the Plowshares Movement, the Council for a Nuclear Weapons Freeze, the Physicians for Social Responsibility, George Kistiakowsky, The Fate of the Earth, Marian Wright Edelman, the Citizens' Clearinghouse for Hazardous Wastes, the Three Mile Island accident, the Winooski 44, Abbie Hoffman, Amy Carter, the Piedmont Peace Project, Anne Braden, César Chávez, the United Farm Workers, the Farm Labor Organizing Committee, Teatro Campesino, LGBT social movements, the Stonewall riots, Food Not Bombs, the anti-war movement during the Gulf War, David Barsamian, opposition to Columbus Day, Indigenous Thought, Rethinking Schools, and the Americans with Disabilities Act of 1990.

Chapter 23, "The Coming Revolt of the Guards", covers Zinn's theory on a possible future radical movement against inequality in America. Zinn argues that there will eventually be a movement made up not only of groups previously involved in radical change (such as labor organizers, black radicals, Native Americans, feminists), but also members of the middle class who are starting to become discontented with the state of the nation. Zinn expects this movement to use "demonstrations, marches, civil disobedience; strikes and boycotts and general strikes; direct action to redistribute wealth, to reconstruct institutions, to revamp relationships".

Chapter 24, "The Clinton Presidency", covers the effects of the Bill Clinton administration on the U.S. and the world. Zinn argues that despite Clinton's claims that he would bring change, his presidency kept many things the same. Topics covered include Jocelyn Elders, the Waco siege, the Oklahoma City bombing, the Crime Bill of 1996, the Antiterrorism and Effective Death Penalty Act of 1996, the Personal Responsibility and Work Opportunity Reconciliation Act of 1996, the 1993 bombing of Iraq, Operation Gothic Serpent, the Rwandan genocide, the War in Bosnia and Herzegovina, the World Bank, the International Monetary Fund, the North American Free Trade Agreement, the 1998 bombing of Afghanistan and Sudan, the 1999 NATO bombing of Yugoslavia, the impeachment of Bill Clinton, Barbara Ehrenreich's Nickel and Dimed, Stand for Children, Jesse Jackson, the Million Man March, Mumia Abu-Jamal, John Sweeney, the Service Employees International Union, the Union of Needletrades, Industrial and Textile Employees, the Worker Rights Consortium, the Poor People's Economic Human Rights Campaign, the UN Universal Declaration of Human Rights, the Telecommunications Act of 1996, Spare Change News, the North American Street Newspaper Association, the National Coalition for the Homeless, anti-globalization, and WTO Ministerial Conference of 1999 protest activity.

Chapter 25, "The 2000 Election and the 'War On Terrorism'", covers the 2000 presidential election and the war on terrorism. Zinn argues that attacks on the U.S. by Arab terrorists (such as the September 11, 2001 attacks) are not caused by a hatred for our freedom (as claimed by President George W. Bush), but by grievances with U.S. foreign policies such as "stationing of U.S. troops in Saudi Arabia ... sanctions against Iraq which ... had resulted in the deaths of hundreds of thousands of children; [and] the continued U.S. support of Israel's occupation of land claimed by Palestinians." Other topics covered include Ralph Nader, and the War in Afghanistan.

== Critical reception ==
When A People's History of the United States was published in 1980, future Columbia University historian Eric Foner reviewed it in The New York Times:

Professor Zinn writes with an enthusiasm rarely encountered in the leaden prose of academic history, and his text is studded with telling quotations from labor leaders, war resisters and fugitive slaves. There are vivid descriptions of events that are usually ignored, such as the Great Railroad Strike of 1877 and the brutal suppression of the Philippine independence movement at the turn of this century. Professor Zinn's chapter on Vietnam—bringing to life once again the free-fire zones, secret bombings, massacres and cover-ups—should be required reading for a new generation of students now facing conscription. Nonetheless, A People's History reflects a deeply pessimistic vision of the American experience ... Uprisings are either crushed, deflected or co-opted ... Why such movements so often fail to achieve their goals is never adequately explained ... The portrayal of these anonymous Americans, moreover, is strangely circumscribed. Blacks, Indians, women, and laborers appear either as rebels or as victims. Less dramatic but more typical lives—people struggling to survive with dignity in difficult circumstances—receive little attention. Nor does Professor Zinn stop to explore the ideologies that inspired the various uprisings he details.

Foner continues by remarking that "history from the bottom up, though necessary as a corrective, is as limited in its own way as history from the top down." What is necessary, Foner asserts, is "an integrated account incorporating Thomas Jefferson and his slaves, Andrew Jackson and the Indians, Woodrow Wilson and the Wobblies, in a continuous historical process, in which each group's experience is shaped in large measure by its relation to others."

Writing in The New York Times, columnist Bob Herbert argued that "Mr. Zinn was often taken to task for peeling back the rosy veneer of much of American history to reveal sordid realities that had remained hidden for too long." Herbert quotes from Zinn's account of the presidency of Andrew Jackson as an example of what he means. Also writing for The New York Times, columnist Michael Powell praised the text's impact on changing the perspective of modern histories:

To describe it as a revisionist account is to risk understatement. A conventional historical account held no allure; he concentrated on what he saw as the genocidal depredations of Christopher Columbus, the blood lust of Theodore Roosevelt and the racial failings of Abraham Lincoln. He also shined an insistent light on the revolutionary struggles of impoverished farmers, feminists, laborers and resisters of slavery and war. Such stories are more often recounted in textbooks today; they were not at the time.

Writing in Dissent, Georgetown University history professor Michael Kazin argued that Zinn is too focused on class conflict, and wrongly attributes sinister motives to the American political elite. He characterized the book as an overly simplistic narrative of elite villains and oppressed people, with no attempt to understand historical actors in the context of the time in which they lived. Kazin wrote:

The ironic effect of such portraits of rulers is to rob 'the people' of cultural richness and variety, characteristics that might gain the respect and not just the sympathy of contemporary readers. For Zinn, ordinary Americans seem to live only to fight the rich and haughty and, inevitably, to be fooled by them.

Kazin argued that A People's History fails to explain why the American political-economic model continues to attract millions of minorities, women, workers, and immigrants, or why the socialist and radical political movements Zinn favors have failed to gain widespread support among the American public.

Sam Wineburg, a professor of history at Stanford University, criticized Zinn's use of leading questions, cherry-picking of sources, and presentation of disputable claims as facts. Wineburg used as an example Zinn's claim that African Americans had "widespread indifference, even hostility" to the American war effort in World War II, which was supported by three quotes. According to Wineburg, Zinn drew the quotes from a book by Lawrence S. Wittner, but omitted evidence from the same pages that African Americans were underrepresented among draft evaders and conscientious objectors. Wineburg argued that the reason for the book's longtime appeal was that it "speaks directly to our inner Holden Caulfield."

Writing in The Chronicle of Higher Education, Christopher Phelps, associate professor of American studies in the School of American and Canadian Studies at the University of Nottingham wrote:

Professional historians have often viewed Zinn's work with exasperation or condescension, and Zinn was no innocent in the dynamic. I stood against the wall for a Zinn talk at the University of Oregon around the time of the 1992 Columbus Quincentenary. Listening to Zinn, one would have thought historians still considered Samuel Eliot Morison's 1955 book on Columbus to be definitive. The crowd lapped it up, but Zinn knew better. He missed a chance to explain how the social movements of the 1960s and 1970s have transformed the writing and teaching of history, how his People's History did not spring out of thin air but was an effort to synthesize a widely shared shift in historical sensibilities. Zinn's historical theorizing, conflating objectivity with neutrality and position with bias, was no better. The critics would be churlish, however, not to acknowledge the moving example Zinn set in the civil-rights and Vietnam movements, and they would be remiss not to note the value of A People's History, along with its limitations. Zinn told tales well, stories that, while familiar to historians, often remained unknown to wider publics. He challenged national pieties and encouraged critical reflection about received wisdom. He understood that America's various radicalisms, far from being "un-American," have propelled the nation toward more humane and democratic arrangements. And he sold two-million copies of a work of history in a culture that is increasingly unwilling to read and, consequently, unable to imagine its past very well.

In The New York Times Book Review in a review of A Young People's History of the United States, volumes 1 and 2, novelist Walter Kirn wrote:

That America is not a better place—that it finds itself almost globally despised, mired in war, self-doubt and random violence—is also a fact, of course, but not one that Zinn's brand of history seems equal to. His stick-figure pageant of capitalist cupidity can account, in its fashion, for terrorism—as when, in the second volume, subtitled "Class Struggle to the War on Terror," he notes that Sept. 11 was an assault on "symbols of American wealth and power"—but it doesn't address the themes of religious zealotry, technological change and cultural confusion that animate what I was taught in high school to label "current events" but that contemporary students may as well just call "the weirdness." The line from Columbus to Columbine, from the first Independence Day to the Internet, and from the Boston Tea Party to Baghdad is a wandering line, not a party line. As for the "new possibilities" it points to, I can't see them clearly.

Professors Michael Kazin, Michael Kammen and Mary Grabar condemn the book as a black-and-white story of elite villains and oppressed victims, a story that robs American history of its depth and intricacy and leaves nothing but an empty text simplified to the level of propaganda.

Professor David E. Kaiser of the Naval War College has gone further than other historians, and charged the book with damaging the country and playing a role in the destruction of American Liberalism. A 2012 poll conducted by the History News Network had A People's History come in as the second worst history book.

During his first term, Donald Trump condemned Zinn and his works during a during a White House Conference on American History on September 17, 2020. "Our children are instructed from propaganda tracts, like those of Howard Zinn, that try to make students ashamed of their own history."

== Other editions and related works ==
A version of the book titled The Twentieth Century contains only chapters 12–25 ("The Empire and the People" to "The 2000 Election and the 'War on Terrorism'"). Although it was originally meant to be an expansion of the original book, recent editions of A People's History now contain all of the later chapters from it. In 2004, Zinn and Anthony Arnove published a collection of more than 200 primary source documents titled Voices of a People's History of the United States, available both as a book and as a CD of dramatic readings. Writer Aaron Sarver notes that although Kazin "savaged" Zinn's A People's History of the United States, "one of the few concessions Kazin made was his approval of Zinn punctuating 'his narrative with hundreds of quotes from slaves and Populists, anonymous wage-earners and ... articulate radicals'".

Sarver argued that, whether Zinn intended it or not, Voices served as a useful response to Kazin's critique. "Voices is a vast anthology that tells heartbreaking and uplifting stories of American history. Kazin will be hard-pressed to charge Zinn with politicizing the intelligence here; the volume offers only Zinn's sparse introductions to each piece, letting the actors and their words speak for themselves." In 2008, Zinn worked with Mike Konopacki and Paul Buhle on creating A People's History of American Empire, a graphic novel that covers various historic subjects drawn from A People's History of the United States as well as Zinn's own history of his involvement in activism and historic events as covered in his autobiography You Can't Be Neutral on a Moving Train. Zinn worked as the editor for a series of books under the A People's History label. This series expands upon the issues and historic events covered in A People's History of the United States by giving them in-depth coverage, and also covers the history of parts of the world outside the United States. These books include:

- A People's History of the Supreme Court by Peter Irons with foreword by Zinn
- A People's History of Sports in the United States by Dave Zirin with an introduction by Howard Zinn
- A People's History of American Empire by Howard Zinn, Mike Konopacki, and Paul Buhle
- The Darker Nations: A People's History of the Third World by Vijay Prashad
- A People's History of the American Revolution by Ray Raphael
- A People's History of the Civil War by David Williams
- A People's History of the Vietnam War by Jonathan Neale
- The Mexican Revolution: A People's History by Adolfo Gilly

Likewise, other books were inspired by the series:

- A People's History of Australia from 1788 to the Present edited by Verity Burgmann. A four-volume series that looks at Australian history thematically, not chronologically.
- A People's History of Science: Miners, Midwives, and Low Mechanicks by Clifford D Connor.
- A People's History of the World by Chris Harman. It is endorsed by Zinn.
- A People's History of Christianity by Diana Butler Bass.
- The Assassination of Julius Caesar: A People's History of Ancient Rome by Michael Parenti. It is endorsed by Zinn.
- A People's History of Modern Europe by William A. Pelz
- Ludowa historia Polski (A People's History of Poland) by Adam Leszczyński (2020)
- An Indigenous Peoples' History of the United States by Roxanne Dunbar-Ortiz. The third of a series of five books which reconstruct U.S. history from marginalized peoples' perspectives.

=== Younger readers' version ===
In July 2007 Seven Stories Press released A Young People's History of the United States, an illustrated, two-volume adaptation of A People's History for young adult readers (ages 10–14). The new version, adapted from the original text by Rebecca Stefoff, is updated through the end of 2006, and includes a new introduction and afterword by Zinn. In his introduction, Zinn writes, "It seems to me it is wrong to treat young readers as if they are not mature enough to look at their nation's policies honestly. I am not worried about disillusioning young people by pointing to the flaws in the traditional heroes." In the afterword, "Rise like lions", he asks young readers to "Imagine the American people united for the first time in a movement for fundamental change." In addition, the New Press released an updated (2007) version of The Wall Charts for A People's History—a 2-piece fold-out poster featuring an illustrated timeline of U.S. history, with an explanatory booklet.

=== Lessons for the classroom ===
In 2008, the Zinn Education Project was launched to promote and support the use of A People's History of the United States (and other materials) for teaching in middle and high school classrooms across the U.S. The goal of the project is to give American students Zinn's version of U.S. history. With funds from an anonymous donor who had been a student of Zinn's, the project began by distributing 4,000 packets to teachers in all states and territories. The project now offers teaching guides and bibliographies that can be freely downloaded.

== Current editions ==
- Zinn, Howard (2005). A People's History of the United States: 1492–present. Harper Perennial Modern Classics. ISBN 0-06-083865-5.
- Zinn, Howard (2003). A People's History of the United States: 1492–present (3rd ed.). HarperCollins. ISBN 0-06-052842-7.
- Zinn, Howard (1999). A People's History of the United States: 1492–present. HarperCollins. ISBN 0-06-019448-0.
- Zinn, Howard (1995). A People's History of the United States: 1492–present (2nd ed.). HarperCollins. ISBN 0-06-092643-0.
- Zinn, Howard (1980). A People's History of the United States (1st ed.). Harper & Row. ISBN 0-06-014803-9.
- Zinn, Howard (2003). The Twentieth Century. Harper Perennial. ISBN 0-06-053034-0
- Zinn, Howard (2005). Arnove, Anthony (ed.). Voices of a People's History of the United States. Seven Stories Press. ISBN 1-58322-628-1.
- A Young People's History of the United States, adapted from the original text by Rebecca Stefoff; illustrated, in two volumes; Seven Stories Press, New York, 2007
  - Vol. 1: Columbus to the Spanish–American War. ISBN 978-1-58322-759-6
  - Vol. 2: Class Struggle to the War on Terror. ISBN 978-1-58322-760-2
- Teaching Editions
  - A People's History of the United States: Teaching Edition
  - A People's History of the United States, Abridged Teaching Edition, Updated Edition
  - A People's History of the United States: Volume 1: American Beginnings to Reconstruction, Teaching Edition
  - A People's History of the United States, Vol. 2: The Civil War to the Present, Teaching Edition
- A People's History of the United States: The Wall Charts; designed by Howard Zinn and George Kirschner; New Press (2007). ISBN 978-1-56584-171-0

== See also ==
- Lies My Teacher Told Me, a 1995 book by sociologist James Loewen
- Open Veins of Latin America, a critical history of Latin America by Eduardo Galeano
- The People Speak, the 2009 film produced and narrated by Howard Zinn and inspired by A People's History of the United States and Voices of a People's History of the United States
- A Patriot's History of the United States: From Columbus's Great Discovery to the War on Terror, written as a conservative response to A People's History of the United States
- The Untold History of the United States, a 2012 documentary series directed, produced, and narrated by Oliver Stone
- Page Smith wrote an eight-volume history with the same title, whose first volume appeared in 1976, four years before Zinn's book was published
- We, the People the Drama of America, a Marxist history of the United States by Leo Huberman (1932)
- People's history
