= Suzanne Nora Johnson =

American corporate lawyer and executive

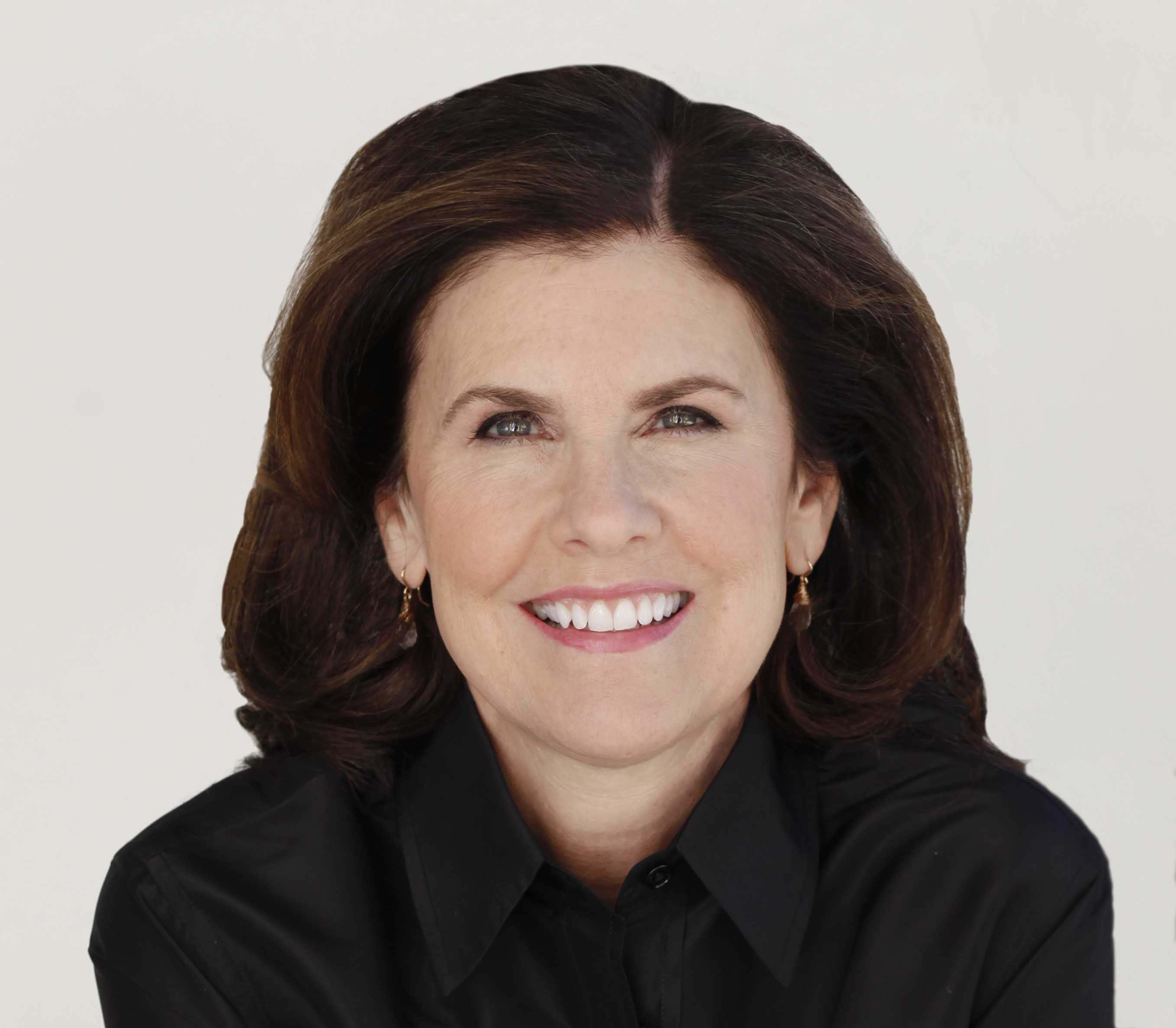
- Johnson in 2017
- Born: Suzanne Michael Nora; May 14, 1957 (age 69); Chicago, Illinois, US
- Education: University of Southern California (BA); Harvard University (JD)
- Occupations: Corporate lawyer; business executive
- Spouse: David G. Johnson (m. 1986)

Suzanne Nora Johnson (born May 14, 1957) is an American businesswoman. Until 2007, she was vice chairman of Goldman Sachs, chair of the Global Markets Institute, head of the firm's Global Investment Research Division, and a member of the firm's management committee. She is the chair of Intuit since 2022.

== Education ==
Johnson received a Bachelor of Arts in interdisciplinary studies from the University of Southern California and a Juris Doctor from Harvard Law School.

== Career ==
Johnson joined Goldman Sachs in 1985 and became a partner in 1992. While at Goldman Sachs, she chaired the Pine Street/Goldman Sachs University board and served as a board member on the Goldman Sachs Foundation. Prior to joining the firm, Johnson was an attorney with Simpson, Thacher & Bartlett and worked as a law clerk on the United States Court of Appeals.

Johnson is lead independent director at Intuit and serves on the board of directors at Pfizer, and VISA.

== Board and advisory roles ==
In July 2008, Johnson was appointed to the board of American International Group (AIG).

Johnson is co-chair of the Brookings Institution and serves on the boards of several other nonprofit institutions: The Broad Museum, The Broad Foundation, the Carnegie Institution for Science, the Markle Foundation. On June 16, 2022, the University of Southern California announced Johnson was elected Chair of the Board of Trustees, replacing Rick Caruso and making her the first woman to hold the position. A USC alumna, Johnson joined the USC Board of Trustees in 1998. She is an advisory board member to the Initiative on Financial Security at the Aspen Institute. Johnson is also a member of the Global Agenda Council for the Future of Financial and Monetary Systems for the World Economic Forum.

She served as chairman of the visiting committee for the Institute for Innovations at Southwestern Medical School at the Southwestern Medical School, University of Texas (2003, 2004) and as a member of the visiting committee at the Department of Embryology at the Carnegie Institution of Washington (2000, 2004) and Harvard Law School (2006).

On June 16, 2022, USC announced Johnson has been elected Chair of the Board of Trustees, replacing Rick Caruso.

== Honors and awards ==
Forbes ranked her at 34 on its 2006 list of "The World's 100 Most Powerful Women".

She was an American Academy of Arts and Sciences Fellow of 2019.
