= Michal Sela Forum =

Israeli nonprofit organization founded in 2020

- פורום מיכל סלה
- Abbreviation: MSF
- Named after: Michal Sela
- Formation: 2020
- Founder: Lili Ben Ami
- Founded at: Israel
- Type: Nonprofit
- Services: Hackathons; App development Security services Public awareness campaigns
- Fields: Information technology
- Official language: Hebrew and English
- CEO: Lili Ben Ami
- Website: Official website

The Michal Sela Forum (Hebrew: פורום מיכל סלה) (MSF) is an Israel-based nonprofit organization founded in 2020 by Lili Ben Ami that seeks to develop technology to aid in the prevention of domestic violence. MSF has participated in a variety of initiatives to support survivors of domestic violence and abuse, including the development of technology and the provision of security services, as well as public awareness campaigns.

The organization is named for Ben Ami's sister, Michal Sela, who was murdered in 2019 by her husband.

== Background ==
In 2020, Lili Ben Ami founded the nonprofit Michal Sela Forum to develop technology to help prevent domestic violence. The organization is named for her sister, Michal Sela, an Israeli social worker and mother who was murdered by her husband in October 2019.

The first slogan adopted by MSF is "May her memory be a revolution." Ben Ami is the CEO of MSF and had previously completed a coding certificate at Ort Jerusalem and worked there as an instructor.

== Safe@Home hackathons ==
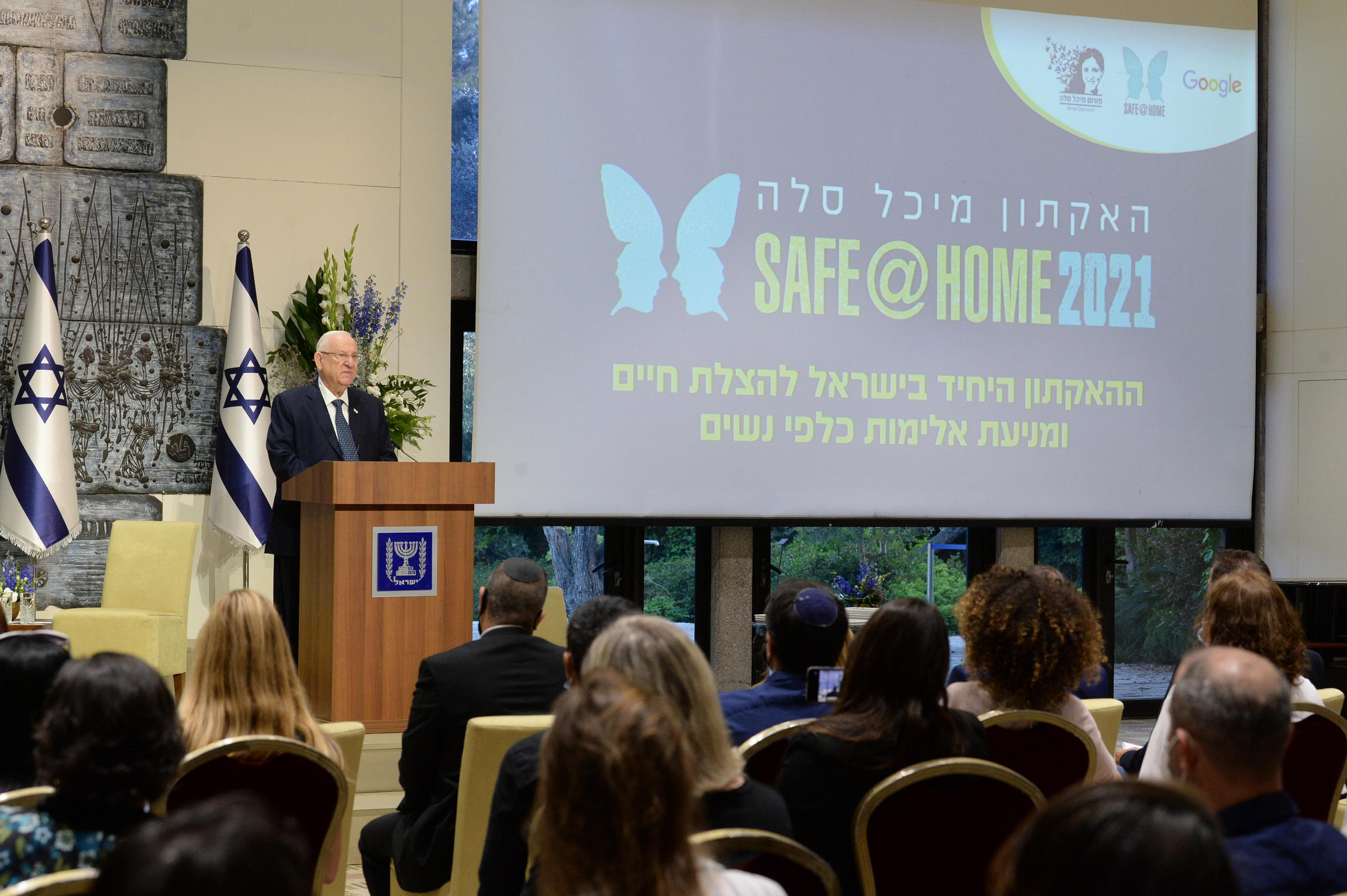
Israeli president Reuven Rivlin at the 2021 Safe@Home hackathon

In 2020, the Michal Sela Forum held a Safe@Home hackathon hosted by Israeli president Reuven Rivlin that focused on the development of technology to prevent domestic violence and intimate partner abuse. The event began on May 18, which would have been the 33rd birthday of Michal Sela. 1800 participants worked for three days in groups to develop ideas for technology, with ideas then chosen by a panel for ongoing development.

The 2020 hackathon focused on three broad types of technology: mining large databases for prevention purposes, technology for use during crises, and personalized monitoring to detect risks of domestic violence. The first place prize was awarded to the idea for the Stay Tuned app, which looks like a news website but also allows messages to be sent and for recordings to be made in secret through a variety of features. Facebook donated NIS 33,000 ($9,380) for the first prize.

Following the hackathon, MSF continued with an accelerator phase of the project to support selected ideas. The voice-activated Relyon safety app is based on one of the ideas developed during and after the 2020 hackathon. In 2021, MSF received a $300,000 grant from Google.org to continue support for the development of technology after the 2021 Safe@Home hackathon.

A third Safe@Home hackathon was held in May 2022. In 2022, the Australia-Israel Chamber of Commerce NSW credited MSF for the idea to create the Social Innovation Accelerator, in collaboration with Microsoft, Mission Australia and government officials, to develop digital tools to help prevent domestic violence.

== Collaborative projects ==
In 2021, the Michal Sela Forum co-sponsored a United Nations event titled "Terror at Home: Fighting Domestic Violence with Innovation and Technology", and participated in a collaboration between Israel and Australia titled Preventing Domestic Violence through Innovation and Technology.

MSF has also developed a defense dog project, to distribute trained "Michal Sela dogs" to women threatened with harm.

In 2022, MSF partnered with Meta to develop the Hebrew-language interface for technology designed to reduce the spread of revenge porn.

Also in 2022, MSF partnered with the Ministry of Public Security in Israel to develop and deploy a pilot program to protect women and children at risk of harm, including a Sayeret Michal ("Michal Special Forces") security program and services that include trained defense dogs.

== Public awareness campaigns ==
The Michal Sela Forum created the "Five Relationship Warning Signs" awareness campaign, with an infographic depicting risks of domestic abuse and contact information for support services. The MSF also participated in the 2021 "Listen To My Voice" campaign, which used artificial intelligence to recreate domestic violence victims in videos, including Sela, encouraging others to get help.

== Honors and awards ==
- 2021 Peres Center for Peace and Innovation Medal of Distinction (awarded to Lili Ben-Ami for founding the Michal Sela Forum)
- 2021 Rappaport Prize for Promising Groundbreaking Initiative from The Bruce and Ruth Rappaport Foundation (awarded to Lili Ben-Ami for MSF)
