= Tomer Avital =

Israeli journalist, social activist, and author

- תומר אביטל
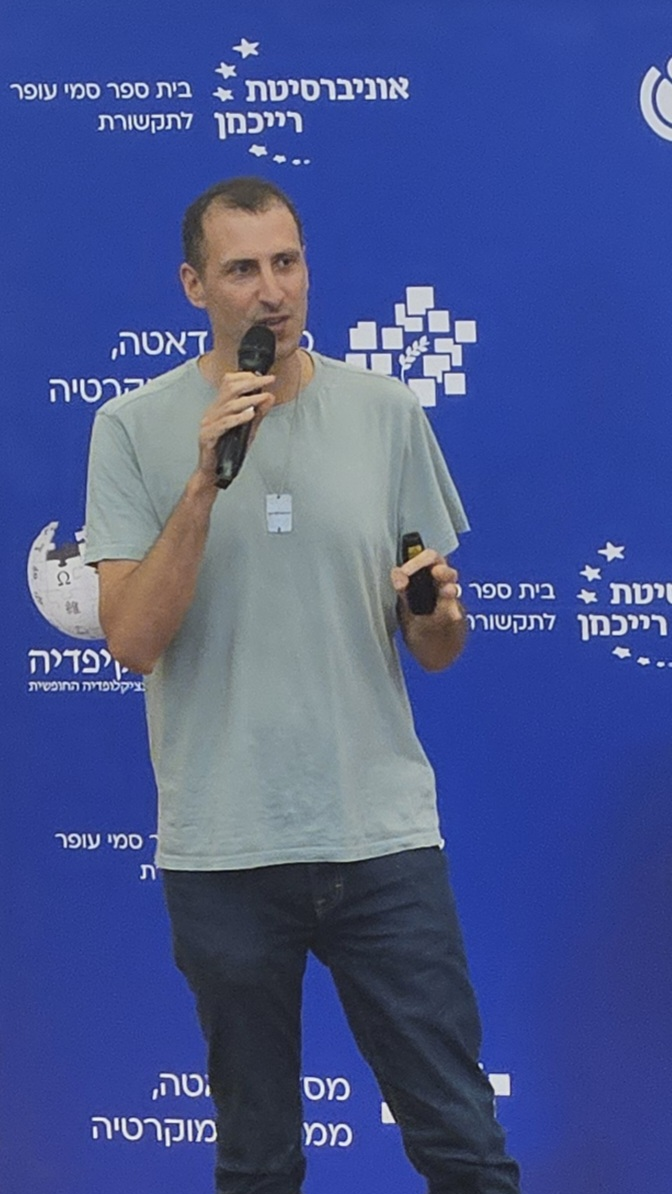
- Born: 2 December 1982 (age 43); Israel
- Education: Hebrew University of Jerusalem
- Occupations: Journalist, social activist, author
- Years active: 2000s–present
- Known for: Investigative journalism, government transparency activism, founder of Shakuf
- Political party: The Democrats

Tomer Avital (Hebrew: תומר אביטל; born 2 December 1982) is an Israeli journalist, social activist, and author. He is the founder of Shakuf (Hebrew: שקוף), an independent media organization focused on government transparency and investigative journalism, and a co-founder of Lobby 99, a public-interest lobbying organization. Avital is known for his reporting on the Knesset, political transparency, lobbying, and the relationship between public institutions and private interests.

== Early life and education ==
Avital began his career in journalism after completing his military service. He later studied political science and literature at the Hebrew University of Jerusalem.

== Journalism career ==
=== Early journalism ===
Avital worked as a journalist and researcher before becoming a political reporter. He was a researcher for the investigative television program Uvda and later served as a parliamentary correspondent covering the Knesset.

=== Calcalist and Knesset reporting ===
Avital served as the Knesset correspondent for the economic newspaper Calcalist. His reporting focused on parliamentary activity, legislation, government decision-making, and the influence of interest groups and lobbyists on Israeli politics.

His work drew attention to issues of governmental transparency and access to information. In 2015, after his parliamentary access credentials were revoked by the Knesset, Avital argued that direct access to the parliament building was essential for political reporting and monitoring elected officials.

=== 100 Days of Transparency ===
In 2015, Avital founded the civic journalism initiative 100 Days of Transparency (Hebrew: 100 ימים של שקיפות), which sought to monitor elected officials and increase public awareness of political activity. The project was funded through public donations and used journalistic methods combined with civic engagement tools.

The initiative focused on issues including transparency in the Knesset, conflicts of interest, lobbying, and the disclosure of information relating to public officials. It received coverage in Israeli media as an example of a new model of independent, publicly supported journalism.

=== Founding Shakuf ===
Following the transparency initiative, Avital established Shakuf, an independent media organization dedicated to investigative journalism and public accountability. The organization operates through public support and focuses on reporting about government institutions, public spending, and political processes.

Shakuf became one of the prominent examples in Israel of nonprofit journalism based on reader participation rather than traditional commercial media models.

== Public activism ==
=== Lobby 99 ===
In 2015, Avital was among the founders of Lobby 99, an Israeli public-interest lobbying organization established with the aim of representing citizens' interests in the Knesset and government institutions. The organization uses a crowdfunding model in which members of the public finance its activities and vote on issues that the organization promotes.

Lobby 99 was established as an alternative to traditional lobbying organizations that represent corporations and industry groups. Its activities have focused on areas including economic regulation, consumer rights, competition, and government transparency.

Avital's involvement in Lobby 99 continued his broader public advocacy work promoting transparency and citizen participation in political decision-making.

== Writing and publications ==
Avital has written books and publications dealing with politics, society, media literacy, and critical thinking.

His first book, HaMishkan (Hebrew: המשכן), published in 2013, is a political thriller set around the corridors of the Israeli parliament and draws on his experience covering the Knesset as a journalist.

In later years, Avital published works focused on misinformation and critical thinking. His book Truth or Fake examines methods for evaluating information, recognizing misleading content, and developing media literacy skills.

== Political activity ==
In 2022, Avital ran in the primary elections of the Israeli Labor Party, and published a personal platform.

Avital received 5,763 votes and ranked tenth among all candidates. However, after taking into account various reserved slots on the party list (such as reserved places for the moshav and kibbutz districts), as well as the party's "zipper" method for balancing the number of women and men on the list, Avital was placed 19th on the Labor Party's list for the 25th Knesset.

In January 2026, it was announced that Avital would compete in the primary elections of The Democrats party. The primaries took place in July, with Avital receiving 16,913 votes and ranking 13th among all participants. After the party leader's reserved slot and representation guarantees were applied, he was placed 15th on The Democrats' candidate list for the 2026 Israeli legislative election.

His candidacy represented a continuation of his previous public activity focused on government accountability, transparency, and civic participation.

== Awards and recognition ==
Avital has received recognition for his work in journalism, digital media, and public transparency initiatives. He has been featured in Israeli media discussions about new models of independent journalism and citizen-funded media.

His work with Shakuf and transparency initiatives has been cited as part of a broader trend in Israeli journalism toward nonprofit investigative reporting and increased public involvement in the media process.

== See also ==
- Investigative journalism
- Freedom of information
