= Public Counsel =

Nonprofit organization

- Company type: Public Interest
- Industry: Legal
- Founded: 1970; 56 years ago
- Headquarters: Los Angeles, California
- Revenue: 12,844,546 United States dollar (2017)
- Total assets: 30,704,764 United States dollar (2022)
- Number of employees: 130+
- Website: www.publiccounsel.org

Public Counsel is the largest provider of pro bono legal services in the United States. Initially called the Beverly Hills Bar Association Law Foundation, it was the first bar-sponsored public interest law firm in the United States.

== Background ==
Founded in 1970 by the Beverly Hills Bar Association, Public Counsel delivers free legal and social services to abused and abandoned children, homeless families and veterans, senior citizens, victims of consumer fraud, and nonprofit organizations serving low-income communities.

Public Counsel works on Veterans Advocacy, Appellate Law and Federal Pro Se, Community Development, Early Care and Education Law, Homelessness Prevention Law, Children's Rights (including Adoptions and Guardianships), Consumer Law (including Bankruptcy), Immigrants' Rights, and Opportunity Under Law.

It is the public interest law office of the Los Angeles County and Beverly Hills Bar Associations and the Southern California affiliate of the Lawyers' Committee for Civil Rights Under Law.

According to the Legal Aid Association of California, "Public Counsel works with over 5,000 volunteer lawyers, law students and legal professionals that assist over 30,000 children, youth, families, and community organizations every year."

== History ==
In 1977, the name was changed to Public Counsel when the Los Angeles County Bar Association joined the Beverly Hills Bar Association as a sponsor of the Law Foundation. The foundation expanded on their existing involvement in public interest litigation to also work on pro bono efforts with the Los Angeles legal community to serve the poor.

In 1995, Public Counsel represented over 7,000 clients.

As of 2013, Public Counsel lacked resources to bring its resources to all communities in Los Angeles County often enough to meet needs.
