= The Speech of Polly Baker =

1747 short story by Benjamin Franklin

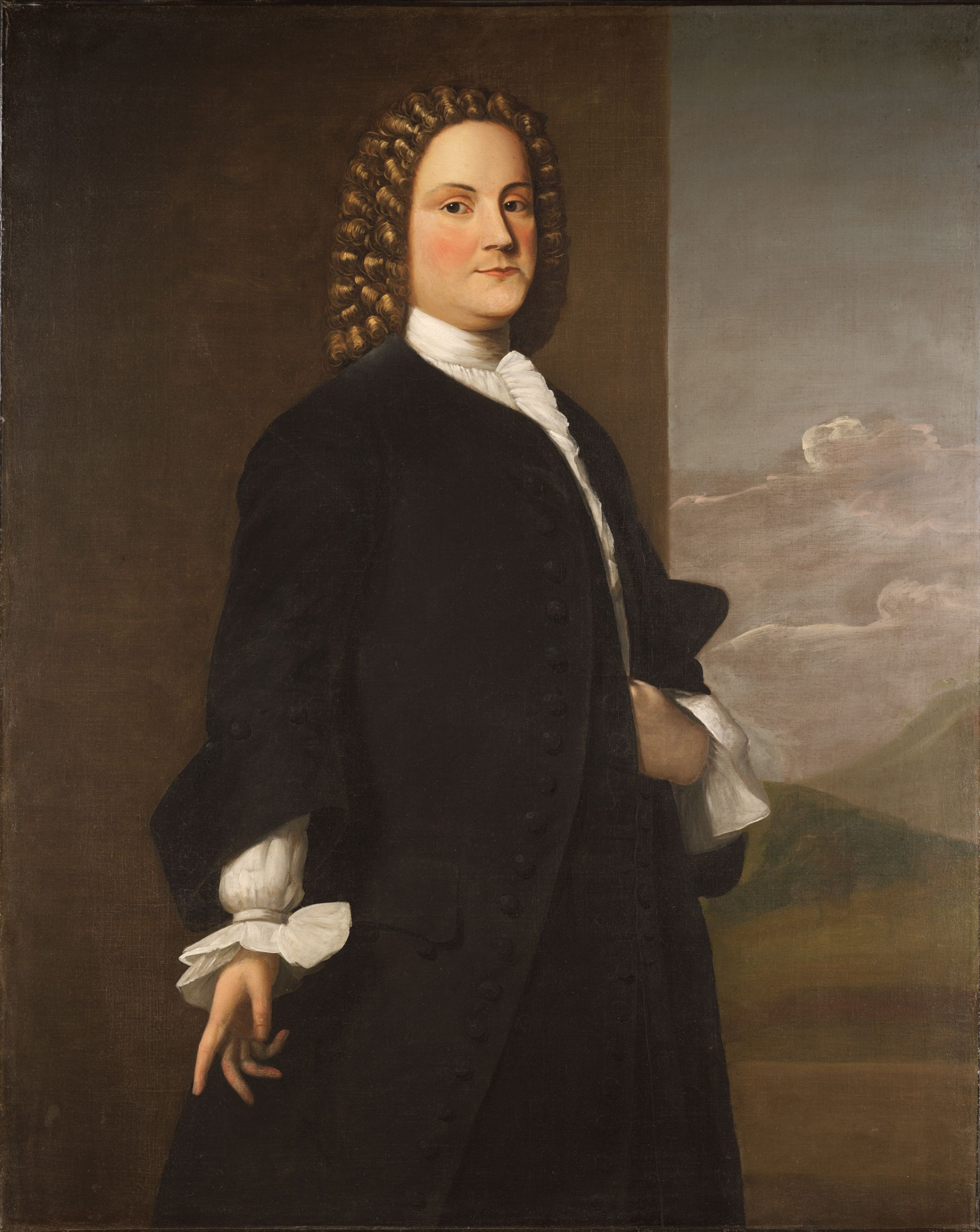
Benjamin Franklin, author of "The Speech of Polly Baker".

"The Speech of Polly Baker" (1747) is the fictional story of a woman put on trial in 1747 for having an illegitimate child. She had been convicted five times in the past for this same crime. Each time, she said, the full blame was placed on her shoulders but not the father's. In later versions, the story ends as she is set free and marries one of the magistrates in charge of her trial.

This story was actually written by Benjamin Franklin as a protest to the unfairness of the early judicial system charging women for having illegitimate children while not charging the fathers, although he did not disclose this until decades later; therefore Polly Baker is one of Franklin's many aliases. Franklin himself had an illegitimate son named William Franklin. See Illegitimacy in fiction.

== The Speech of Polly Baker ==
=== Preface ===
The speech of Polly Baker, before a Court of Judicature, at Connecticut near Boston in New England; where she was prosecuted the Fifth Time, for having a Bastard Child: Which influenced the Court to dispense with her Punishment, and induced one of her Judges to marry her the next day.

=== Polly Baker's speech ===
May it please the Honourable Bench to indulge me a few Words: I am a poor unhappy Woman; who have no Money to Fee Lawyers to plead for me, being hard put to it to get a tolerable Living. I shall not trouble your Honours with long Speeches; for I have not the presumption to expect, that you may, by any Means, be prevailed on to deviate in your Sentence from the Law, in my Favour. All I humbly hope is, that your Honours would charitably move the Governor’s Goodness on my Behalf, that my Fine may be remitted. This is the Fifth Time, Gentlemen, that I have been dragg’d before your Courts on the same Account; twice I have paid heavy Fines, and twice have been brought to public Punishment, for want of Money to pay those Fines. This may have been agreeable to the Laws; I do not dispute it: But since Laws are sometimes unreasonable in themselves, and therefore repealed; and others bear too hard on the Subject in particular Circumstances; and therefore there is left a Power somewhere to dispense with the Execution of them; I take the Liberty to say, that I think this Law, by which I am punished, is both unreasonable in itself, and particularly severe with regard to me, who have always lived an inoffensive Life in the Neighbourhood where I was born, and defy my Enemies (if I have any) to say I ever wrong’d Man, Woman, or Child. Abstracted from the Law, I cannot conceive (may it please your Honours) what the Nature of my Offence is. I have brought Five fine Children into the World, at the Risque of my Life: I have maintained them well by my own Industry, without burthening the Township, and could have done it better, if it had not been for the heavy Charges and Fines I have paid. Can it be a Crime (in the Nature of Things I mean) to add to the Number of the King’s Subjects, in a new Country that really wants People? I own I should think it rather a Praise worthy, than a Punishable Action. I have debauch’d no other Woman’s Husband, nor inticed any innocent Youth: These Things I never was charged with; nor has any one the least cause of Complaint against me, unless, perhaps the Minister, or the Justice, because I have had Children without being Married, by which they have miss’d a Wedding Fee. But, can even this be a Fault of mine? I appeal to your Honours. You are pleased to allow I don’t want Sense; but I must be stupid to the last Degree, not to prefer the honourable State of Wedlock, to the Condition I have lived in. I always was, and still am, willing to enter into it; I doubt not my Behaving well in it, having all the Industry, Frugality, Fertility, and Skill in Oeconomy, appertaining to a good Wife’s Character. I defy any Person to say I ever Refused an Offer of that Sort: On the contrary, I readily Consented to the only Proposal of Marriage that ever was made me, which was when I was a Virgin; but too easily confiding in the Person’s Sincerity that made it, I unhappily lost my own Honour, by trusting to his; for he got me with Child, and then forsook me: That very Person you all know; he is now become a Magistrate of this County; and I had hopes he would have appeared this Day on the Bench, and have endeavoured to moderate the Court in my Favour; then I should have scorn’d to have mention’d it; but I must Complain of it as unjust and unequal, that my Betrayer and Undoer, the first Cause of all my Faults and Miscarriages (if they must be deemed such) should be advanced to Honour and Power, in the same Government that punishes my Misfortunes with Stripes and Infamy. I shall be told, ’tis like, that were there no Act of Assembly in the Case, the Precepts of Religion are violated by my Transgressions. If mine, then, is a religious Offence, leave it, Gentlemen, to religious Punishments. You have already excluded me from all the Comforts of your Church Communion: Is not that sufficient? You believe I have offended Heaven, and must suffer eternal Fire: Will not that be sufficient? What need is there, then, of your additional Fines and Whippings? I own, I do not think as you do; for, if I thought, what you call a Sin, was really such, I would not presumptuously commit it. But how can it be believed, that Heaven is angry at my having Children, when, to the little done by me towards it, God has been pleased to add his divine Skill and admirable Workmanship in the Formation of their Bodies, and crown’d it by furnishing them with rational and immortal Souls? Forgive me Gentlemen, if I talk a little extravagantly on these Matters; I am no Divine: But if you, great Men, (*) must be making Laws, do not turn natural and useful Actions into Crimes, by your Prohibitions. Reflect a little on the horrid Consequences of this Law in particular: What Numbers of procur’d Abortions! and how many distress’d Mothers have been driven, by the Terror of Punishment and public Shame, to imbrue, contrary to Nature, their own trembling Hands in the Blood of their helpless Offspring! Nature would have induc’d them to nurse it up with a Parent’s Fondness. ’Tis the Law therefore, ’tis the Law itself that is guilty of all these Barbarities and Murders. Repeal it then, Gentlemen; let it be expung’d for ever from your Books: And on the other hand, take into your wise Consideration, the great and growing Number of Batchelors in the Country, many of whom, from the mean Fear of the Expence of a Family, have never sincerely and honourably Courted a Woman in their Lives; and by their Manner of Living, leave unproduced (which I think is little better than Murder) Hundreds of their Posterity to the Thousandth Generation. Is not theirs a greater Offence against the Public Good, than mine? Compel them then, by a Law, either to Marry, or pay double the Fine of Fornication every Year. What must poor young Women do, whom Custom has forbid to sollicit the Men, and who cannot force themselves upon Husbands, when the Laws take no Care to provide them any, and yet severely punish if they do their Duty without them? Yes, Gentlemen, I venture to call it a Duty; ’tis the Duty of the first and great Command of Nature, and of Nature’s God, Increase and multiply: A Duty, from the steady Performance of which nothing has ever been able to deter me; but for its Sake, I have hazarded the Loss of the public Esteem, and frequently incurr’d public Disgrace and Punishment; and therefore ought, in my humble Opinion, instead of a Whipping, to have a Statue erected to my Memory.

== Themes and genre ==
On the surface "The Speech of Polly Baker" appears to be a light-hearted and "amusing story". However, Franklin presents a protest against legislation that punished women for out-of-wedlock sexual relations by imposing fines and whippings while the father of the child went without punishment. Through her use of rhetorical questions to the magistrates, Franklin shows the inequity of the prevailing justice system.

Franklin creates a sympathetic fictional character in Polly Baker. According to literary critic Etta Madden, Baker's assertion that she's worthy of a statue in the town square reflects and mocks "Mather's memorializing of saints in his Magnalia Christi Americana" as well as the execution sermons Puritans espoused to make "lessons of wayward females." Furthermore, Madden explains that Baker's rational speech shows echoes of Anne Hutchinson, although some might not find her speech rational at all. Therefore, Madden argues, the piece shows more complexity than is initially apparent. Another critic (Aldridge) argues that if taken out of the context of American literature, "The Speech of Polly Baker" can be considered as a "universal myth along the lines of Don Juan and Faust."

== Publication history ==
"The Speech of Polly Baker" was first published in the April issue of The London Magazine or May 1747 in The Gentleman's Magazine. It was also published in 17 April 1747 edition of the Derby Mercury and 18 April 1747 edition of the Newcastle Courant. In both of these it was presented without comment, leaving the reader to assume it was a genuine court report. The Derby Mercury stated they had the report "from the General and St James's Evening Posts &c, April 16th 1747".

Initially the piece was published anonymously, but in 1905 it was included in The Writings of Benjamin Franklin, although the editor had yet to prove Franklin's authorship. Max Hall, in Benjamin Franklin and Polly Baker: The History of a Literary Deception (1960) proved conclusively that Franklin wrote the piece, a conclusion accepted by scholars.
