= Lobby 99 =

Israeli social initiative lobbying for public interests

- לובי 99
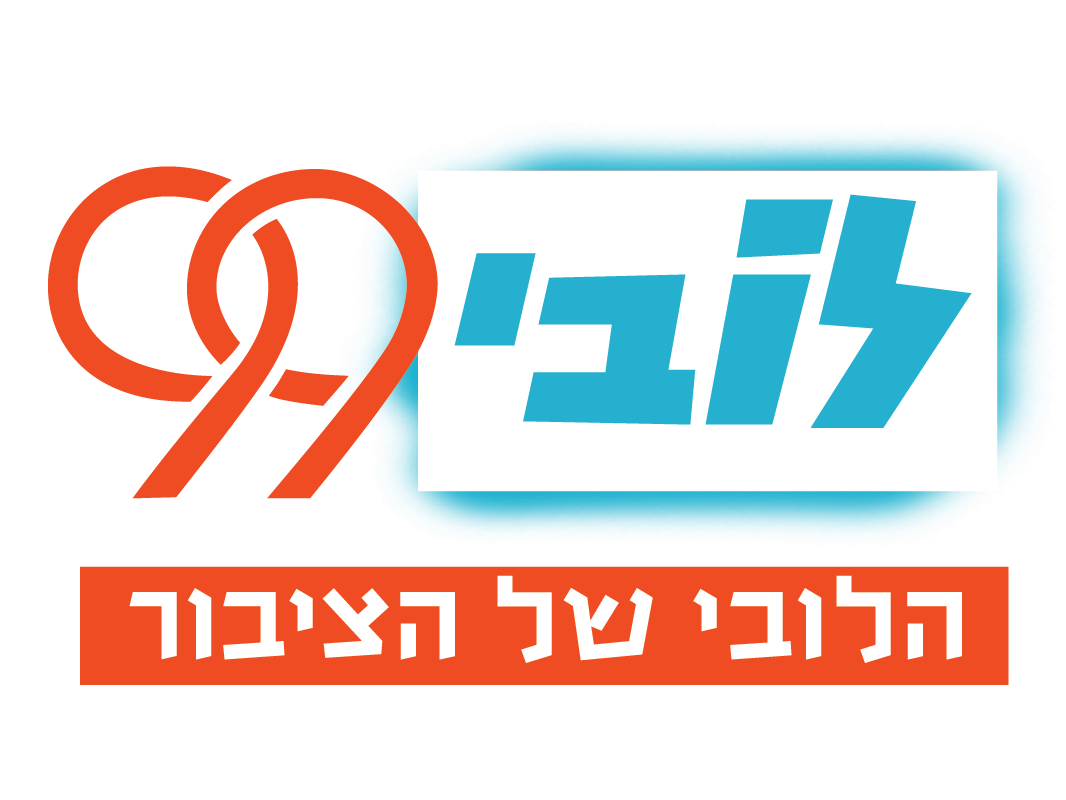
- Formation: 2015
- Founders: Yaya Fink; Linor Deutsch; Tomer Avital
- Purpose: Promoting the interests of the general public through political lobbying in the Knesset and Government
- Location: Israel
- Key people: Linor Deutsch (CEO)
- Website: lobby99.org.il

Lobby 99 is an Israeli not-for-profit initiative, aimed at promoting the interests of the public in the Knesset and the government. It was founded as a reaction to the wide phenomenon of commercial lobbyists that do the same, but only for corporations, tycoons and closed interest groups. Its name draws inspiration from the widely known We are the 99% slogan, coined by the occupy movement.

== History ==
The initiative began as crowdfunding project in June 2015. After it was funded with 136,000 ILS from 1084 donors (twice the original goal), a vote was held in order to decide on the main aspects upon which to focus the lobbying. These were: transparency, royalties from natural resources (in Israel specifically natural gas and minerals) and a reform in the banking sector.

From March 2016, the initiative is funded by monthly participation fees paid by members. Each participant has one vote, regardless of the sum of their monthly payment, which the individual member decides. Among public figures, journalists and academics who have expressed their support for the initiative are: Yaron Zelekha, Orly Vilnai, Amit Segal and Guy Rolnik.

== People ==
The initiator is Yair (Yaya) Fink, former CEO of "Good Neighbor" NGO, head of staff for MK Shelly Yachimovitch and a former officer in an IDF Paratrooper brigade. He was the CEO.

Lawyer Linor Deutsch, former VP Regulation and legal advisor in the Farmer Association (Hitahdut HaIkarim) in Israel, was the first active lobbyist, and is the CEO.
