= Jim Zwick =

American scholar (1956–2008)

- Born: March 23, 1956
- Died: January 24, 2008 (aged 51); Syracuse, New York, U.S.
- Education: Earlham College (BA); Syracuse University (MA)
- Occupation: Author

Jim Zwick (1956–2008) was an American studies scholar and author known for his works on anti-imperialism.

Zwick was considered a leading authority on American author Mark Twain, with a particular focus on Twain's anti-imperialist activism. He was also an innovator in the use of the World Wide Web for education, digitizing thousands of historical documents and analyses into organized collections of educational webpages.

== Early life ==
Zwick was born in 1956. He attended Wethersfield High School and later the Shanti School, an alternative school in Hartford, Connecticut. During the 1970s, he lived in Hong Kong and occasionally traveled to the People's Republic of China and the Philippines. Zwick earned his BA from Earlham College in 1981 and later completed an MA in Comparative Politics and World History at Syracuse University, where he also taught for several years.

== Work ==
Zwick's published works focused on essays and analyses of American anti-imperialism. His 1992 book, Mark Twain's Weapons of Satire: Anti-Imperialist Writings on the Philippine-American War, concentrated on Twain's political activism and anti-imperialist writings, such as To the Person Sitting in Darkness, a satirical response to Rudyard Kipling's The White Man's Burden. Weapons of Satire also covered Twain's role as Vice President of the American Anti-Imperialist League, alongside previously unpublished communications between its members. Twain scholars praised the book for aggregating and contextualizing obscure and inaccessible sources to highlight Twain's anti-imperialist activism, which remained largely unknown outside of academic circles.

Zwick was recognized as an early innovator of online archival work, and was credited as the first to digitally publish significant research about Mark Twain. As early as 1995, he published organized collections of digitized documents and analyses on anti-imperialism on his website. Anti-Imperialism in the United States, 1898–1935 offered visitors thousands of digitized sources for free, including literature, essays, and political cartoons. His site expanded upon his research for Weapons of Satire; Zwick broadened the scope to further contextualize anti-imperialist movements with pages surrounding figures such as Jane Addams and Scott Nearing, and organizations including the American Civil Liberties Union.

Another digital collection, Sentenaryo/Centennial: The Philippine Revolution and Philippine-American War, was published to Zwick's website in 1997. Sentenaryo compiled digitized documents related to the Philippine-American War. By 2003, his webpages included over 10,000 digitized historical materials.

From 1997 to 2001, Zwick curated the Mark Twain site for About.com. Zwick's site was one of approximately 700 topic sites on the About.com network.

Zwick published his final book, Confronting Imperialism: Essays on Mark Twain and the Anti-Imperialist League, in 2007. The book's 11 essays connect Twain's early writings, such as his Letters from Hawaii, to his anti-imperialist activism later in life. In the final essay, Zwick proposes Twain's anti-imperialist views became a "lost legacy" due to censorship by Twain's publisher Harper & Brothers and biographer Albert Paine, alongside a broader cultural avoidance of anti-imperialist movements.

In 2007, Zwick permanently closed all of his educational websites, including BoondocksNet.com and HistoryIllustrated.com.

== Death ==
Zwick died on January 24, 2008 at his Syracuse, New York home from complications of diabetes. He was 51 years old.

== Other work ==
Zwick contributed as a Program Advisor for the 2002 documentary Mark Twain, which was directed by Ken Burns.

== Bibliography ==
- Mark Twain's Weapons of Satire: Anti-Imperialist Writings on the Philippine-American War. Syracuse Univ. Press, 1992. ISBN 0-81560-268-5
- Inuit Entertainers in the United States: From the Chicago World's Fair through the Birth of Hollywood. West Conshohocken, Pa.: Infinity Publishing, 2006. ISBN 0-74143-488-1
- Confronting Imperialism: Essays on Mark Twain and the Anti-Imperialist League. West Conshohocken, Pa.: Infinity Publishing, 2007. ISBN 0-74144-410-0

== See also ==
- Digital preservation
