= Eric Weinrib =

American producer (born 1972)

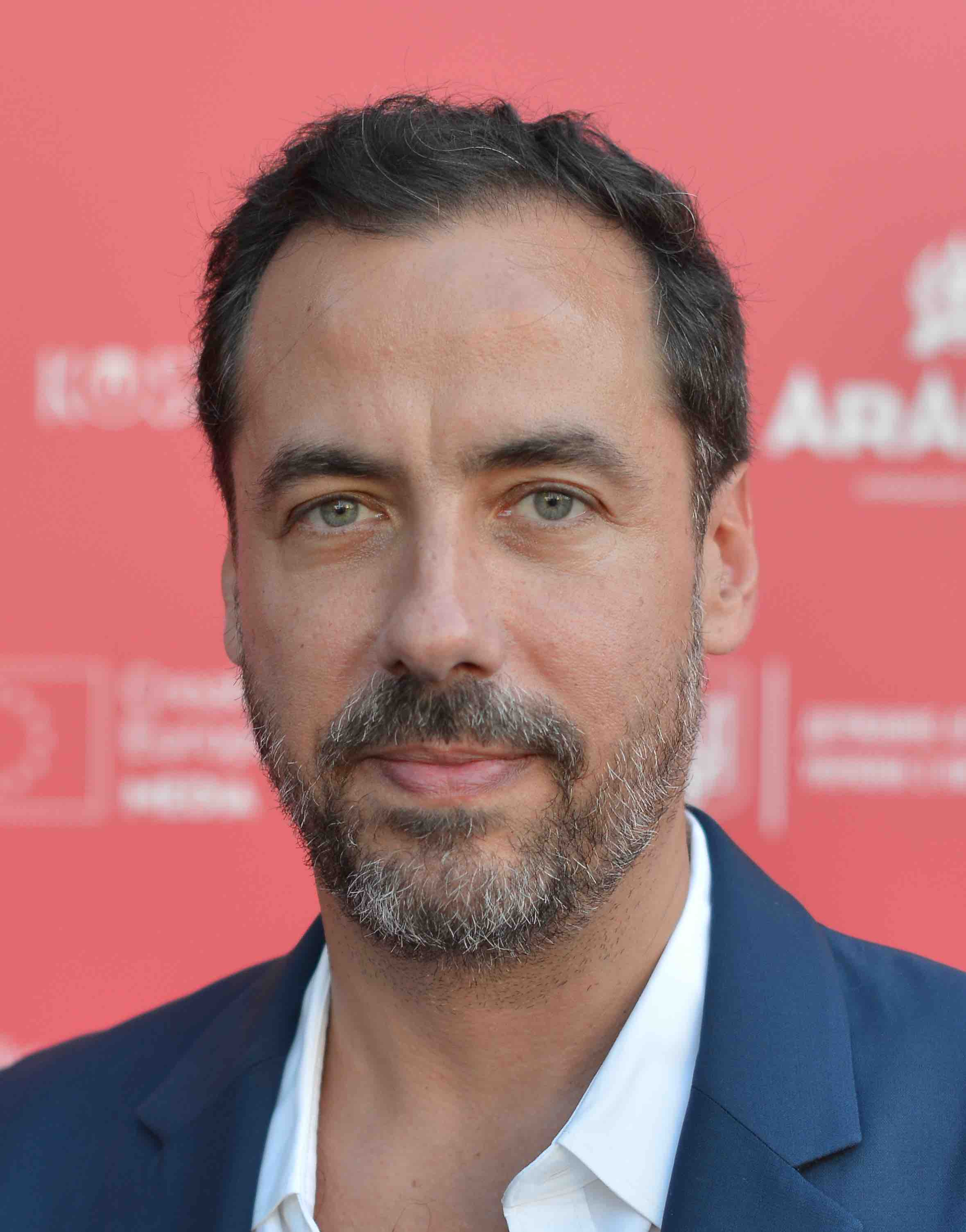
- Born: April 21, 1972 (age 54); Bay Shore, New York, U.S.
- Occupation: Filmmaker

Eric Weinrib (born 21 April 1972) is a filmmaker and TV producer from Plainview, New York, United States.

== Career ==
Weinrib is a Peabody Award-winning documentary filmmaker whose work has appeared on HBO, Showtime, Netflix, Hulu, AppleTV, Amazon Prime, Tubi, Vice TV and in theaters. Weinrib's Vice TV documentary "Between Musk and Mars" was nominated for a News & Documentary Emmy Award. His hour-long HBO special, "The Paradise Papers," won the New York Press Club Award for business reporting and his Hulu documentary, "Russia's War on Hip-Hop," won the Los Angeles Press Club's National Arts & Entertainment Journalism Award. Weinrib's two-part "Jamaica for Sale" series won a Citation for Excellence from the Overseas Press Club of America and was nominated for a Press Association of Jamaica award for Best Television Feature/Documentary.

Weinrib directed the feature documentary "Scream of My Blood: A Gogol Bordello Story" alongside fellow director Nate Pommer. The movie chronicles the life of Eugene Hütz, founder of multicultural immigrant punk band Gogol Bordello, featuring over two decades of exclusive, behind-the-scenes footage. The movie world premiered at the Tribeca Film Festival on June 13, 2023, where it received a Special Jury Mention. "Scream of My Blood" had its international premiere at the Karlovy Vary International Film Festival in Czech Republic and its Polish premiere at the Warsaw International Film Festival where it won an Audience Award. Variety describes the movie as "fascinating and triumphant." Released by MVD Entertainment, the movie is available on Apple TV, Prime Video, YouTube TV, DVD and Blu-ray.

Weinrib is the producer and director of Roseanne for President!, a documentary about Roseanne Barr's 2012 run for president of the United States. The movie premiered at the 2015 Tribeca Film Festival and won the Founders Prize at the 2015 Traverse City Film Festival. A review in The New York Times stated "Politics meets celebrity in Eric Weinrib’s fascinating documentary 'Roseanne for President!'" and The Daily Beast called it "Intimate and brilliantly observed." The movie was acquired by IFC Films and opened theatrically on July 1, 2016. The movie became available for streaming on the Hulu platform on Inauguration Day 2017. Newsweek selected it as "one of seven movies and shows to watch" online the following weekend.

Weinrib was a producer for the Emmy Award-winning documentary series VICE on HBO. His pieces include "Closing Gitmo," "Flint Water Crisis" and "White Collar Weed," which The Denver Post describes as a marijuana story with "a fresh angle" and PopMatters describes as "an age-old cautionary tale of the privatization of a new market."

Weinrib is a long-time collaborator of filmmaker Michael Moore as an archival researcher on Fahrenheit 9/11, coordinating producer on SiCKO and associate producer on Capitalism: A Love Story.

Weinrib was a staff writer on season one of Comedy Central's Strangers with Candy starring Stephen Colbert, Amy Sedaris and Paul Dinello.

Weinrib's short film, Jimmy Walks Away, was an Official Selection of the 1997 Sundance Film Festival. Jimmy Walks Away was included on “Park City; The Sundance Collection,” a DVD compilation of Sundance shorts, and was licensed for broadcast by Showtime.

In the wake of Hurricane Melissa's devastating impact on Jamaica, Weinrib co-produced "Nice Up Jamaica! A Fundraiser for Hurricane Relief," held at Brooklyn Bowl on December 16, 2025. Artists that performed that night include Yellowman, Johnny Osbourne, Larry McDonald, Yaadcore, Screechy Dan, Red Fox, Anant Pradhan and more.

Weinrib's music credits also include producing Michael Moore's studio rendition of Bob Dylan’s The Times They Are A-Changin', included on the Occupy Wall Street benefit album, Occupy This Album; and presenting a 50th anniversary appearance of Ken Kesey’s “Further” bus and Zane Kesey's Merry Band of Pranksters at Brooklyn Bowl. Weinrib's high school band, Asphyxia, played two shows at Frank Cariola's Sundance rock club in Bay Shore, Long Island, in 1989.

Weinrib is a former professional forklift driver who ran as an unaffiliated candidate in the 2016 Presidential election.

== Awards and nominations ==
- Los Angeles Documentary Film Festival - Best Director Award (2024) - "Scream of My Blood: A Gogol Bordello Story"
- Calgary Underground Film Festival - Audience Award (2024) - "Scream of My Blood: A Gogol Bordello Story"
- Warsaw International Film Festival - Audience Award (2023) - "Scream of My Blood: A Gogol Bordello Story"
- News & Documentary Emmy Awards - Nominee (2023) - "Vice News Tonight"
- Overseas Press Club of America - Citation of Excellence (2022) - "Jamaica for Sale"
- News & Documentary Emmy Awards - Nominee (2021) - "Between Musk and Mars"
- SUNY Delhi - Alumnus of Merit Award (2021)
- Peabody Award (2020) - "Losing Ground"
- Los Angeles Press Club Award - Best Hard News Feature (2020) - "Russia's War on Hip-Hop"
- New York Press Club Award - Best Business Reporting (2018) - "The Paradise Papers"
- Traverse City Film Festival - Founders Prize (2015) - "Roseanne for President!"
