= Ralston McKenzie =

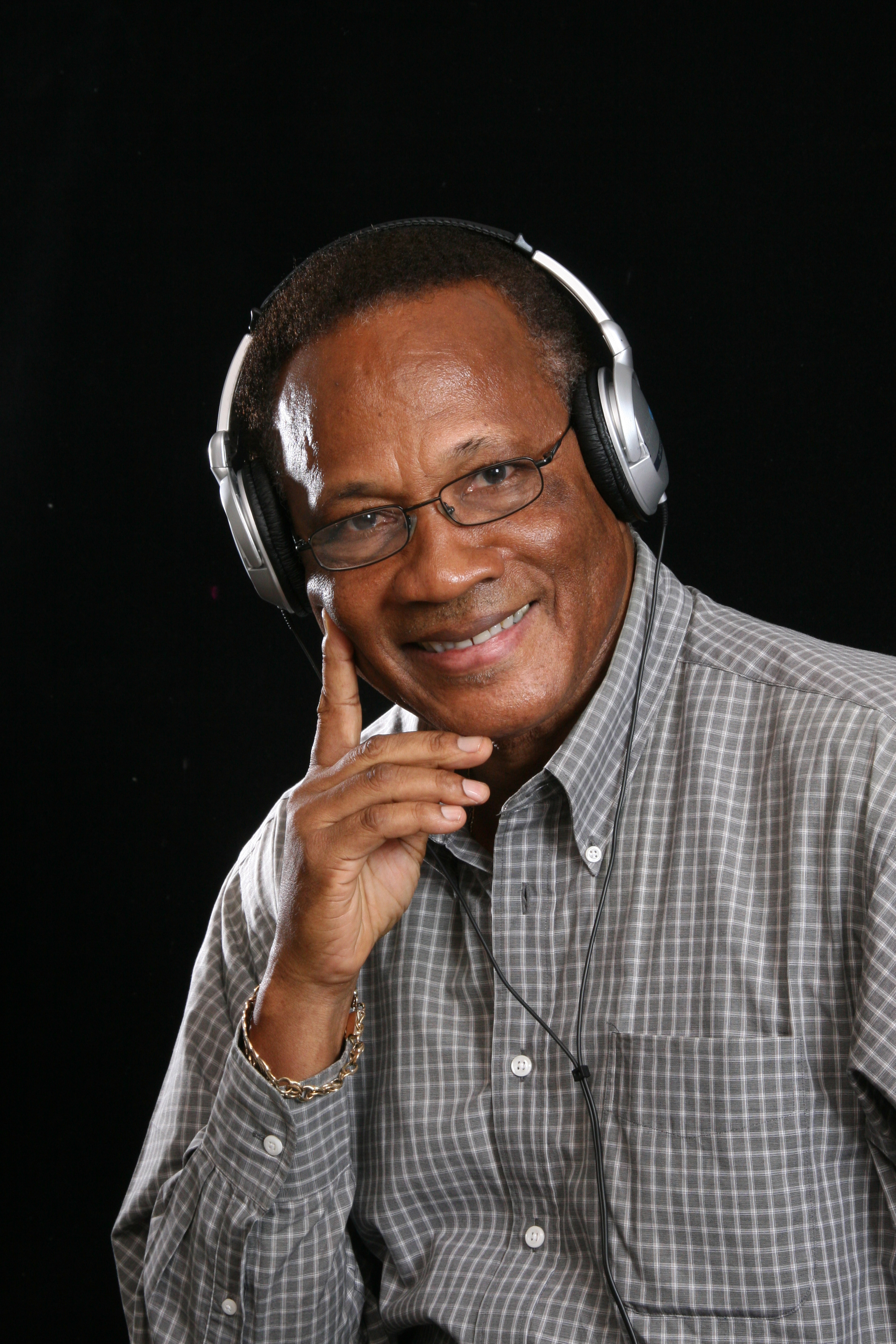
Ralston McKenzie, 2009, JM

Ralston McKenzie is a Jamaican broadcaster and journalist, producer/presenter of the award-winning community service programme Sunday Contact. The show, on for decades, aired weekly on RJR 94 FM (Radio Jamaica) and the Internet, linking persons with long-lost family and friends.

He has set up Jamaica Contact, a web-based extension of his family search service. Other founding members and directors of Jamaica Contact are the Jamaican nationals Peter Townsend and Nicole McKenzie, and German national Sven Littkowski.

In a media career spanning some 40 years, Mr. McKenzie has served multiple functions at various levels in both television and radio since accepting the grant of a "Leave of Absence" from his pre-clinical studies in the University of the West Indies Faculty of Medicine at Mona.

== Early years ==
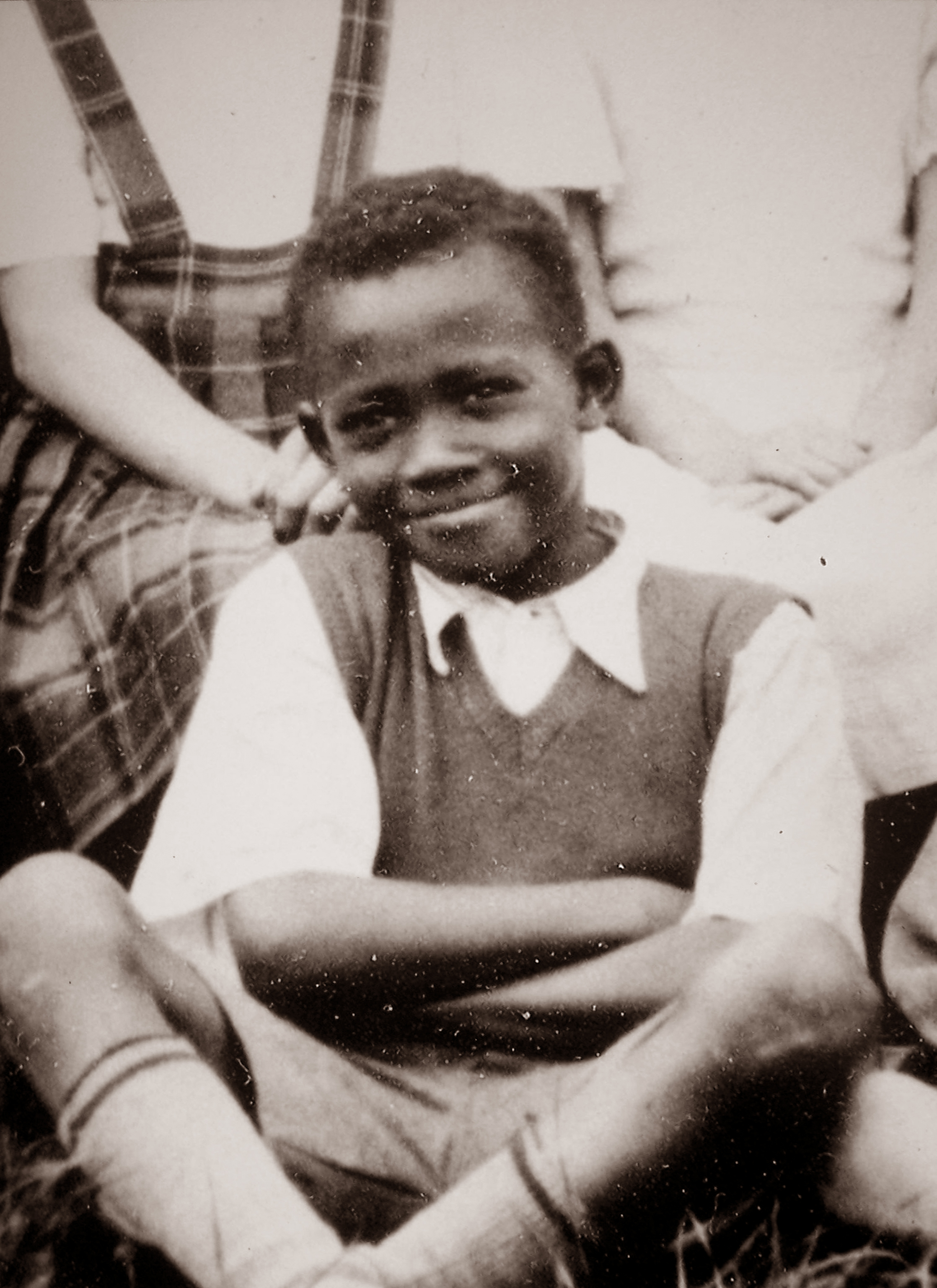
Ralston McKenzie, 1953, UK

Mr. McKenzie was born in Kingston, Jamaica, schooled in Spanish Town and then in the United Kingdom and Egypt in the early 1950s, a time full of political changes and developments in Middle East, when his family joined their father – a Royal Air Force Flight Sergeant in World War II on his overseas postings. Returning to Jamaica, Mr. McKenzie graduated from the St. George College in 1959 and resuming studies at the UWI earning a BSc. Honors Degree in International Relations. Further studies and a desire to enter the United Nations, or become a career diplomat, took him to the Fordham University, New York City, where he earned a Master of Science Degree in International Affairs.

== Awards and memberships ==
Returning again to Jamaica, he joined Life of Jamaica (now Sagicor Life) in 1987. As a Senior Life Underwriter, he garnered several industry awards including "Top of the Million Dollar Round Table" (1993).

Mr. McKenzie has given long years of voluntary service to various community, civic and social organizations, such as the St. Georges Old Boys Association, Press Association of Jamaica, Jamaica Save-the-Children Fund, and the Mel Nathan Institute for Social Development in Hannah Town.

He was an active participant in the National Festival of the Performing Arts, a Gold Medal winner and National Champion in Speech and Drama for four years, and served on the board of the Jamaica Cultural Development Commission.

Among several awards in the broadcasting field, he was also awarded the Prime Ministers Medal in the field of Community Development in December 1983.

Mr. McKenzie was married for over 35 years, with four children. He is currently a Lector in the Lay Ministry of St. Richards Church on Red Hills Road.
