= Anti-War Committee =

The Anti-War Committee (AWC) is a grassroots political organization based in Minneapolis, Minnesota that wants to end U.S. intervention.

== Organizational history ==
The Anti-War Committee began in December 1998, with 13 people who committed civil disobedience to protest the bombing of Iraq. The Anti-War Committee grew out of the Twin Cities chapter of the Committee in Solidarity with the People of El Salvador (CISPES), which had been active since the early 1980s.

== Mission and focus ==
The mission of the Anti-War Committee is to organize a broad-based movement which stands in solidarity with those communities, here and abroad, who are adversely affected by U.S. foreign policies. Its members believe that the U.S. government has no right to intervene, militarily, economically or politically, in the affairs of independent nations. The Anti-War Committee calls for an end to the 2026 war on Iran. Historically it has called for the immediate withdrawal of all coalition troops from Iraq and Afghanistan, and collaborated with other groups to organize protests toward that goal.

The Anti-War Committee was the first organization to apply for permits and announce plans to protest at the 2008 Republican National Convention, which was held in St. Paul, Minnesota.

On September 24, 2010, the Anti-War Committee's office was raided by the FBI. Several of its leading members also had their homes raided by the FBI. The Anti-War Committee is being investigated for "material support for terrorism". The AWC feels they are being targeted by the FBI for their solidarity work with Palestine and Colombia and were a part of founding the Committee to Stop FBI Repression nationally to defend their right to organize and protest.

== Coalitions and other issues ==
The Anti-War Committee participates in the Iraq Peace Action Coalition (IPAC) now called the Minnesota Peace Action Coalition. The AWC also concerns itself with other issues, such as supporting striking unions, such as during the Northwest Airlines Mechanics strike in 2005-2006; and participating in the immigrant rights protests of 2006.

== See also ==
- Junkyard Empire
- List of anti-war organizations

== Media coverage ==
- Anti-war march challenges McCain on last day of RNC: Crowd repeatedly tear gassed, 396 arrested as police pull out all stops to prevent anti-war march from reaching Xcel Center Fight Back! News (retrieved September 16, 2008)
- Anti-war protesters already planning for GOP convention KARE11.com (retrieved November 28, 2006)
- One year later, peace activists not giving up Minnesota Public Radio, dated March 19, 2004 (retrieved November 28, 2006)
- 25 protesters plead not guilty Minnesota Daily, dated April 4, 2003 (retrieved November 28, 2006)
- Anti-war protesters ramp up opposition Minnesota Public Radio, dated March 20, 2003 (retrieved November 28, 2006)
- Antiwar groups blast Bush and outline protests starting today (Star Tribune, March 19, 2003 - retrieved November 28, 2006)
