= 2008 Republican National Convention =

U.S. political event held in Saint Paul, Minnesota

- 2008 presidential election

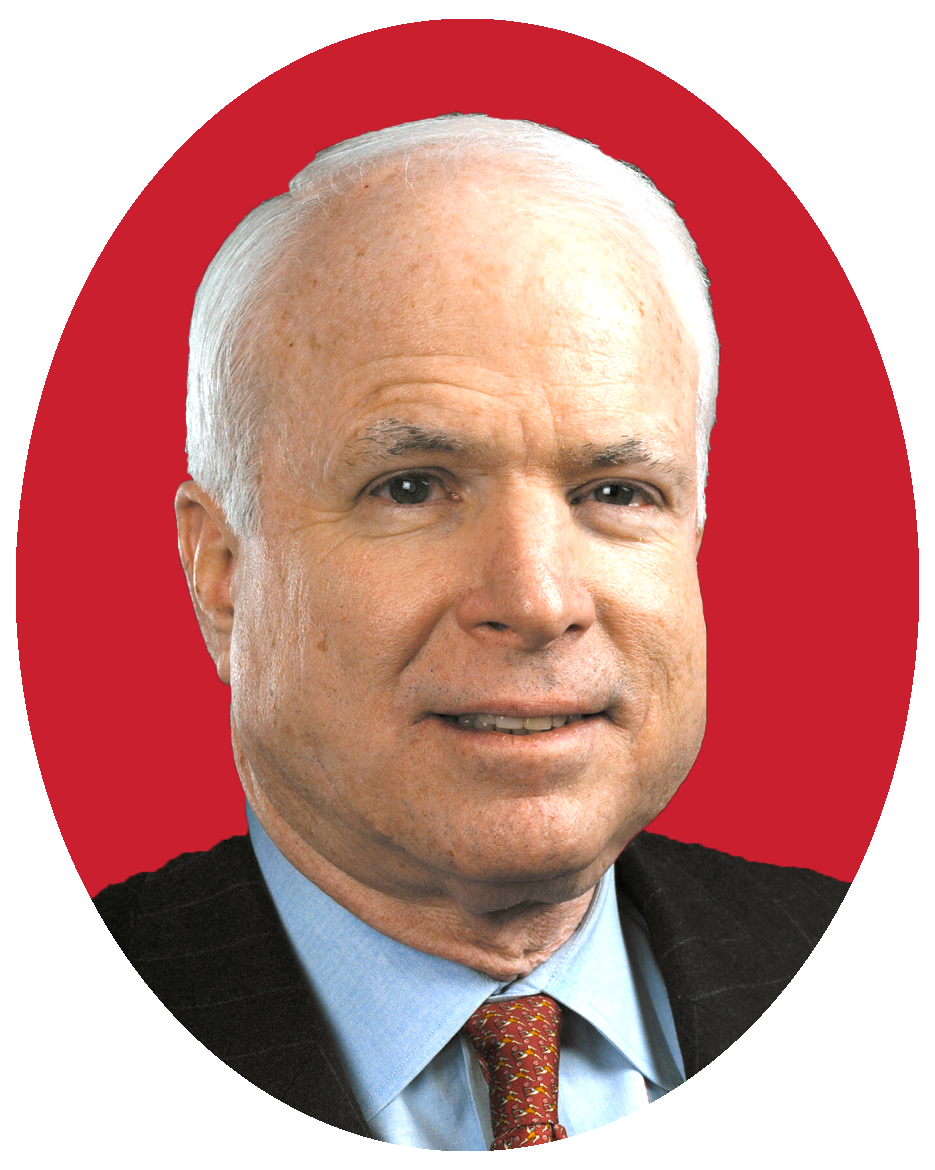
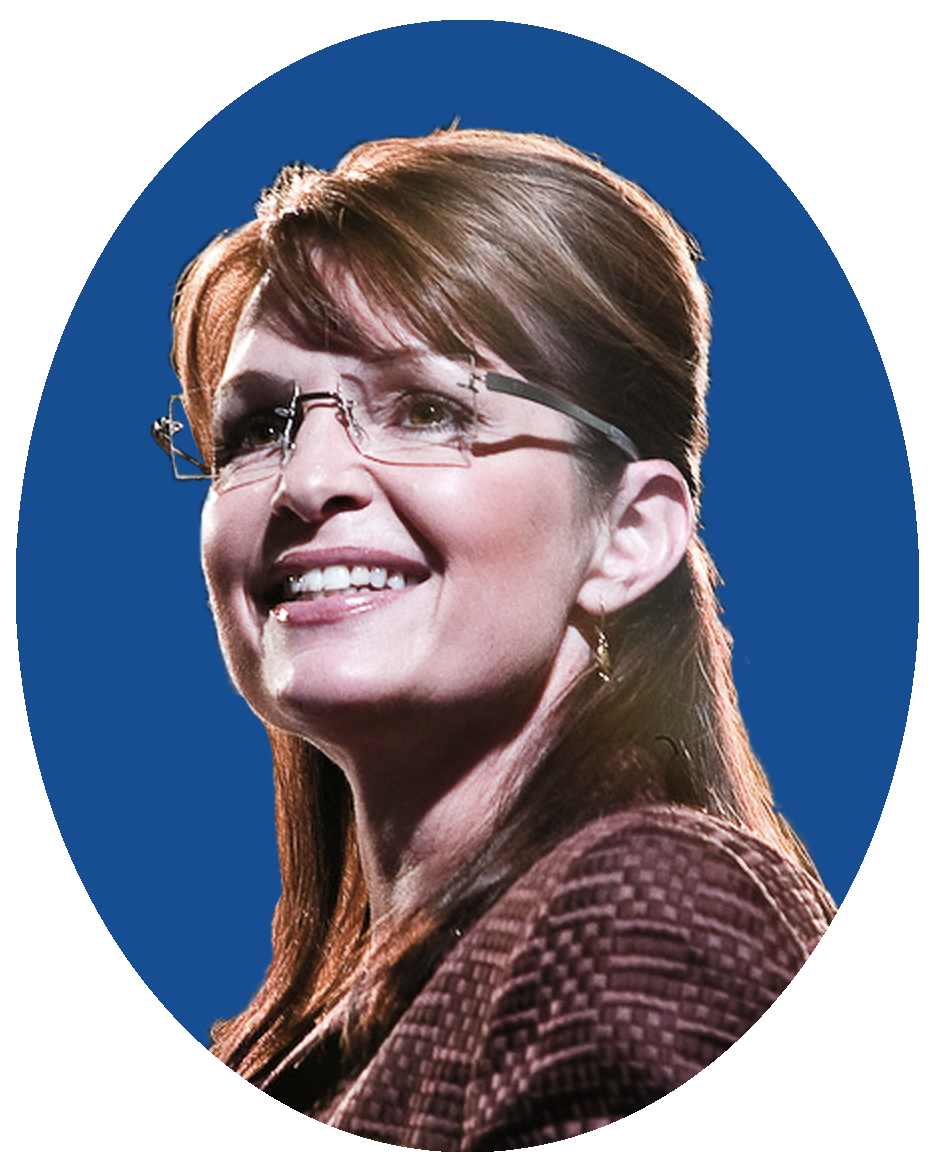
- Nominees; McCain and Palin

Convention
- Dates: September 1–4, 2008
- City: Saint Paul, Minnesota
- Venue: Xcel Energy Center
- Keynote speaker: Rudy Giuliani
- Notable speakers: George W. Bush; Laura Bush; Joe Lieberman; Mike Huckabee; Mitt Romney; Michael Steele

Candidates
- Presidential nominee: John McCain of Arizona
- Vice-presidential nominee: Sarah Palin of Alaska

Voting
- Total delegates: 2,380
- Votes needed for nomination: 1,191
- Results (president): McCain (AZ): 2,343 (99.28%); Paul (TX): 15 (0.63%); Romney (MA): 2 (0.09%)
- Results (vice president): Palin (AK): 100% (Acclamation)
- Ballots: 1

The 2008 Republican National Convention took place at the Xcel Energy Center (now Grand Casino Arena) in Saint Paul, Minnesota, from September 1, through September 4, 2008. The first day of the Republican Party's convention fell on Labor Day, the last day of the popular Minnesota State Fair, though because of Hurricane Gustav, this day was mostly a call for action to help victims and formal, required activities; most of the politicking and partying did not start until Tuesday, the second scheduled day.

This was the latest any major party convention has ever been convened, and the first one to take place entirely in September. Traditionally, the party who holds the White House has the opportunity to select the date of its convention second, and normally the challenging party holds their convention in July while the incumbent party holds its convention in August. This year, later dates were chosen for both conventions because the parties wanted to schedule their conventions after the 2008 Summer Olympics ended.

President George W. Bush did not attend the convention (although he did appear by satellite), in order to oversee relief efforts to help citizens recover from Hurricane Gustav. The attending delegates at the convention nominated Senator John McCain from Arizona for president and Governor Sarah Palin of Alaska for vice president. 1,191 pledged delegates were necessary for candidates to win the respective nominations.

== Speakers ==
=== Monday, September 1, 2008 ===
- Scheduled speeches by U.S. president George W. Bush, U.S. vice president Dick Cheney and U.S. senator Joe Lieberman were canceled because of Hurricane Gustav. An abbreviated meeting was scheduled for late afternoon to conduct business required under party rules. The remainder of the convention schedule was determined day by day depending on the nature of the storm.
- Laura Bush, First Lady of the United States
- Cindy McCain, wife of (then-presumptive) Presidential nominee John McCain –speech by wife of presidential nominee

The two women appeared together and delivered short remarks to encourage support for hurricane relief efforts.

=== Tuesday, September 2, 2008 ===
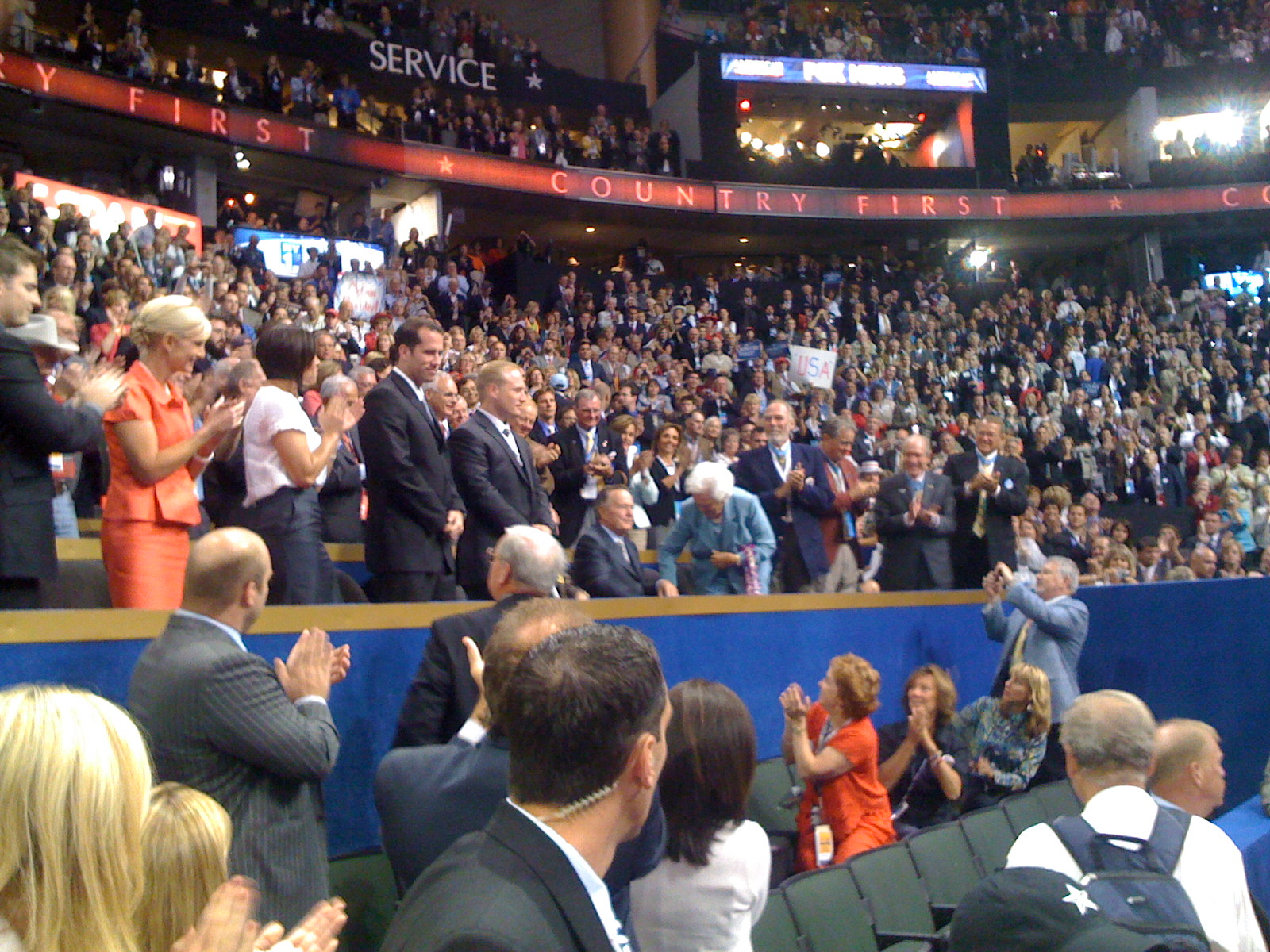
Members of the Bush and McCain families when former President George H. W. Bush was honored on September 2, 2008

- George W. Bush, President of the United States (by satellite). Because of the events of Hurricane Gustav, Bush did not attend the convention, and delivered his remarks to the delegates by satellite. Bush honored McCain's courage and his maverick reputation, and said that McCain is ready to lead.
- Laura Bush, First Lady of the United States. The First Lady touted McCain's experience and credentials, while talking about her and her husband's achievements in the White House. She introduced President Bush who appeared by satellite.
- Joe Lieberman, Independent Democrat (formerly Democrat) U.S. Senator from Connecticut. Lieberman, who ran for Vice President (as a Democrat) with Democratic Party Presidential nominee, Al Gore in the 2000 presidential election, praised McCain and argued that Barack Obama, the Democratic Party's presidential nominee, was not ready to be president.
- Fred Thompson, former U.S. senator from Tennessee. Thompson attacked perceived liberal-media bias, branded Democrats as elitists, and praised McCain's vice presidential pick, Sarah Palin.
- Norm Coleman, U.S. Senator from Minnesota
- John Boehner, U.S. House of Representative Minority Leader from Ohio

=== Wednesday, September 3, 2008 ===
September 3

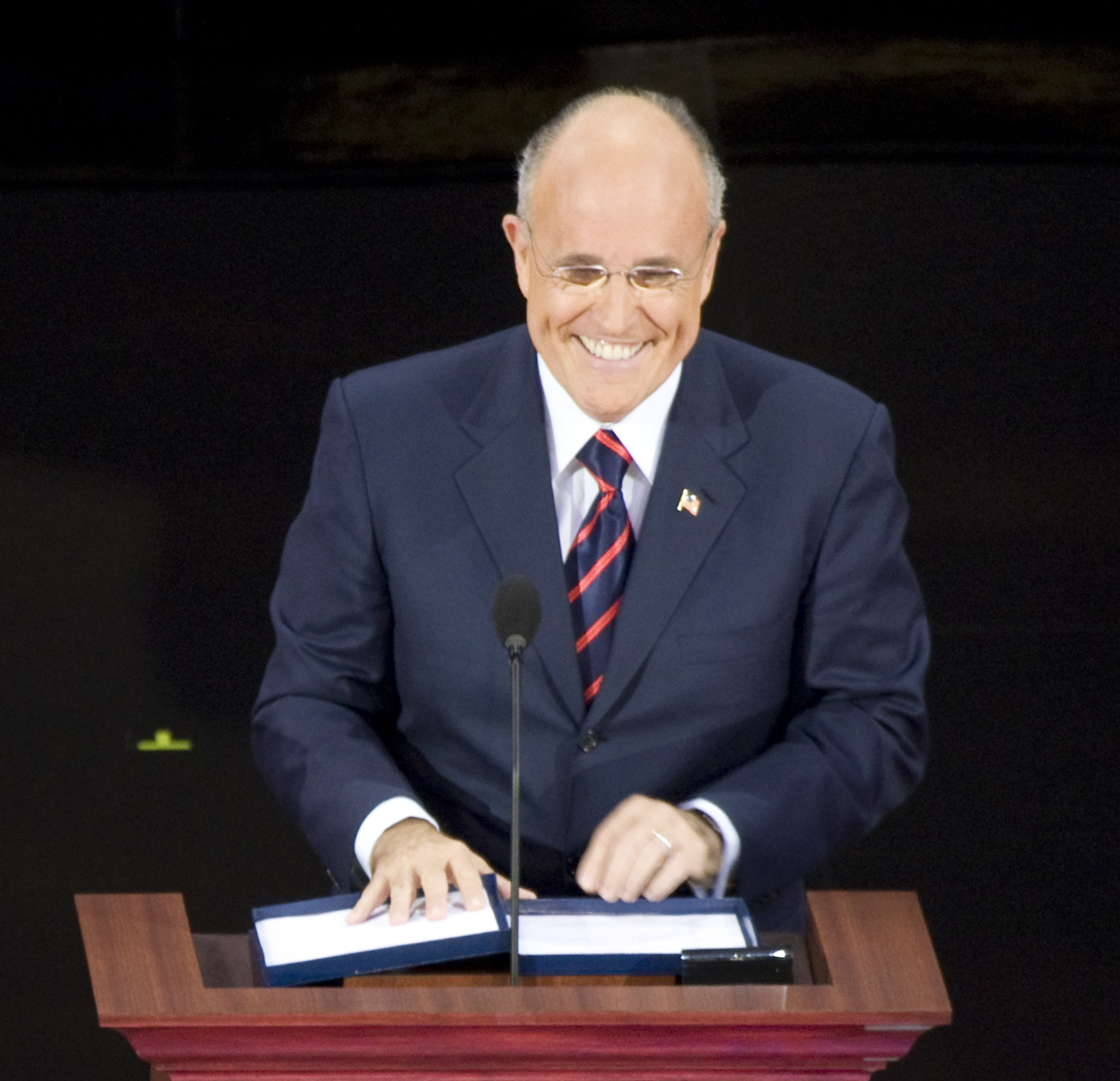
Rudy Giuliani (keynote speaker)

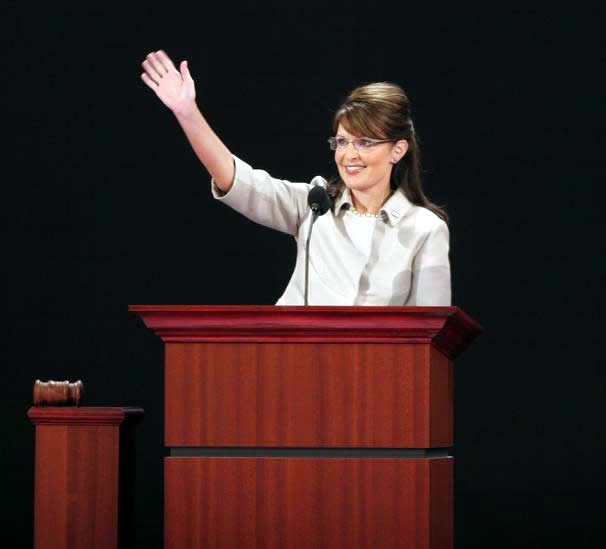
Sarah Palin

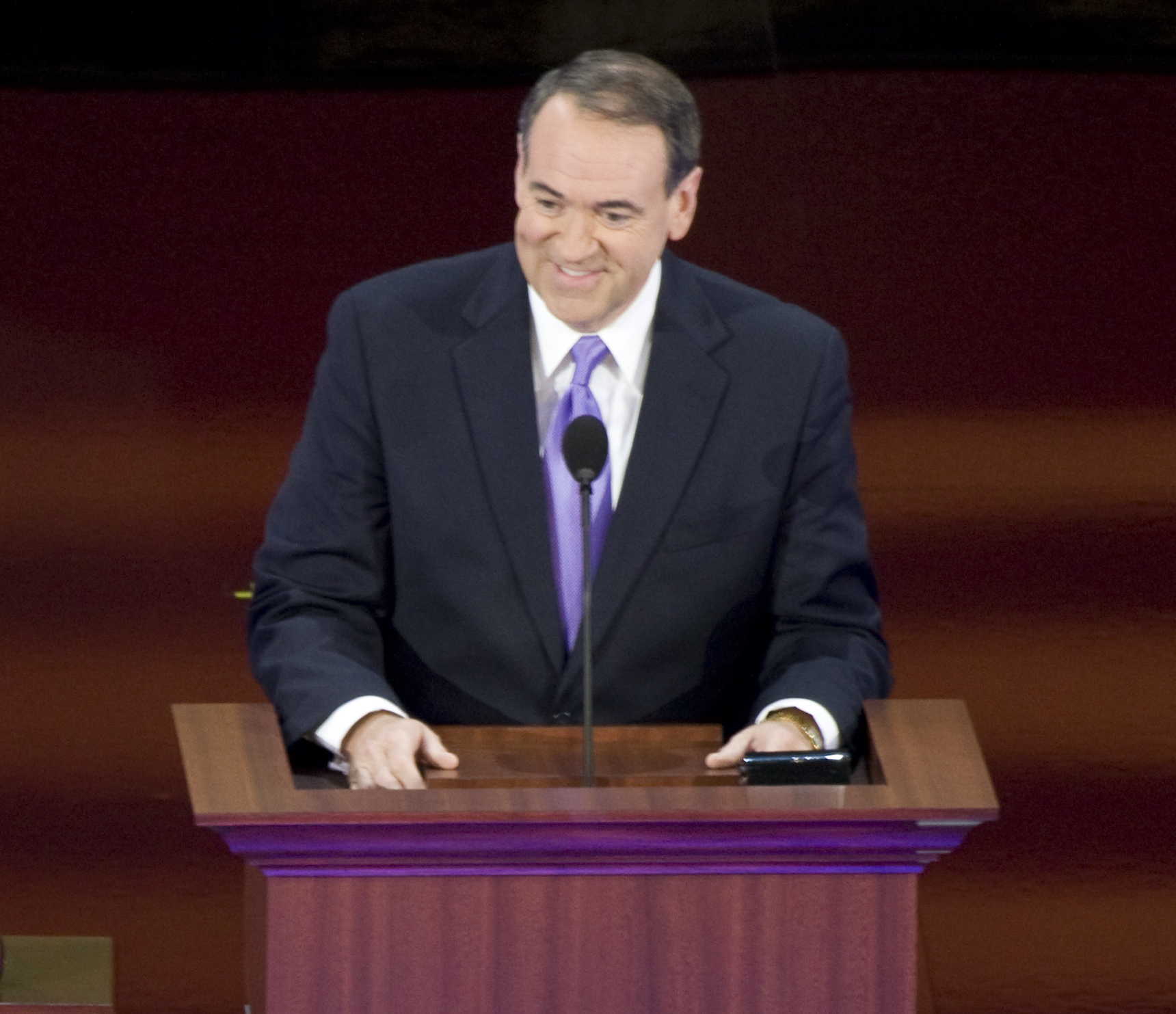
Mike Huckabee

- Rudy Giuliani (keynote speaker), former Mayor of New York City, New York. Giuliani questioned Obama's judgment and overall experience. He said, "John [McCain] has been tested. Barack Obama has not. Tough times require strong leadership, and this is no time for on-the-job training." He also said that Obama and Democrats "are in a state of denial" about the threat of terrorism to the U.S., while McCain can confront and defeat "anything that terrorists do to us". He further said that Obama is without a record of leadership: "He's the least-experienced candidate for President of the United States in at least the last 100 years." The former Mayor praised Palin as "one of the most successful governors in America—and the most popular... She already has more executive experience than the entire Democratic ticket."
- Sarah Palin, Governor of Alaska and (then-presumptive) Vice Presidential nominee. In Palin's speech, she portrayed herself as a reformer and a fighter for change. She introduced her family and described her life in Alaska, saying she is just "an average hockey mom," while commenting on her recent negative publicity: "Here's a little news flash for all those reporters and commentators: I'm not going to Washington to seek their good opinion. I'm going to Washington to serve the people of this great country." She defended her relative lack of political experience and criticized Obama. Her speech was well received by the convention delegates and media commentators.
- Mike Huckabee, former governor of Arkansas. While he commended Obama for clinching his party's nomination, Huckabee said that Obama lacks experience and judgment, especially in foreign policy. He said, "I don't believe his preparation or his plans will lift America up."
- Mitt Romney, former governor of Massachusetts. Romney commented on Obama's campaign message of change, saying, "We need change all right. Change from a liberal Washington to a conservative Washington. We have a prescription for every American who wants change in Washington—throw out the big-government liberals and elect John McCain." Romney said that Obama "ducked and dodged" when asked about terrorism and Islamic extremism.
- Mitch McConnell, U.S. Senate Minority Leader. McConnell performed the Adoption and Announcement of Vice-Presidential nominee Palin.
- Norm Coleman, U.S. Senator from Minnesota
- Linda Lingle, Governor of Hawaii
- Carly Fiorina, former chair and chief executive officer of Hewlett-Packard
- Meg Whitman, former president and chief executive officer of eBay
- Anne F. Beiler, founder of Auntie Anne's

=== Thursday, September 4, 2008 ===
September 4

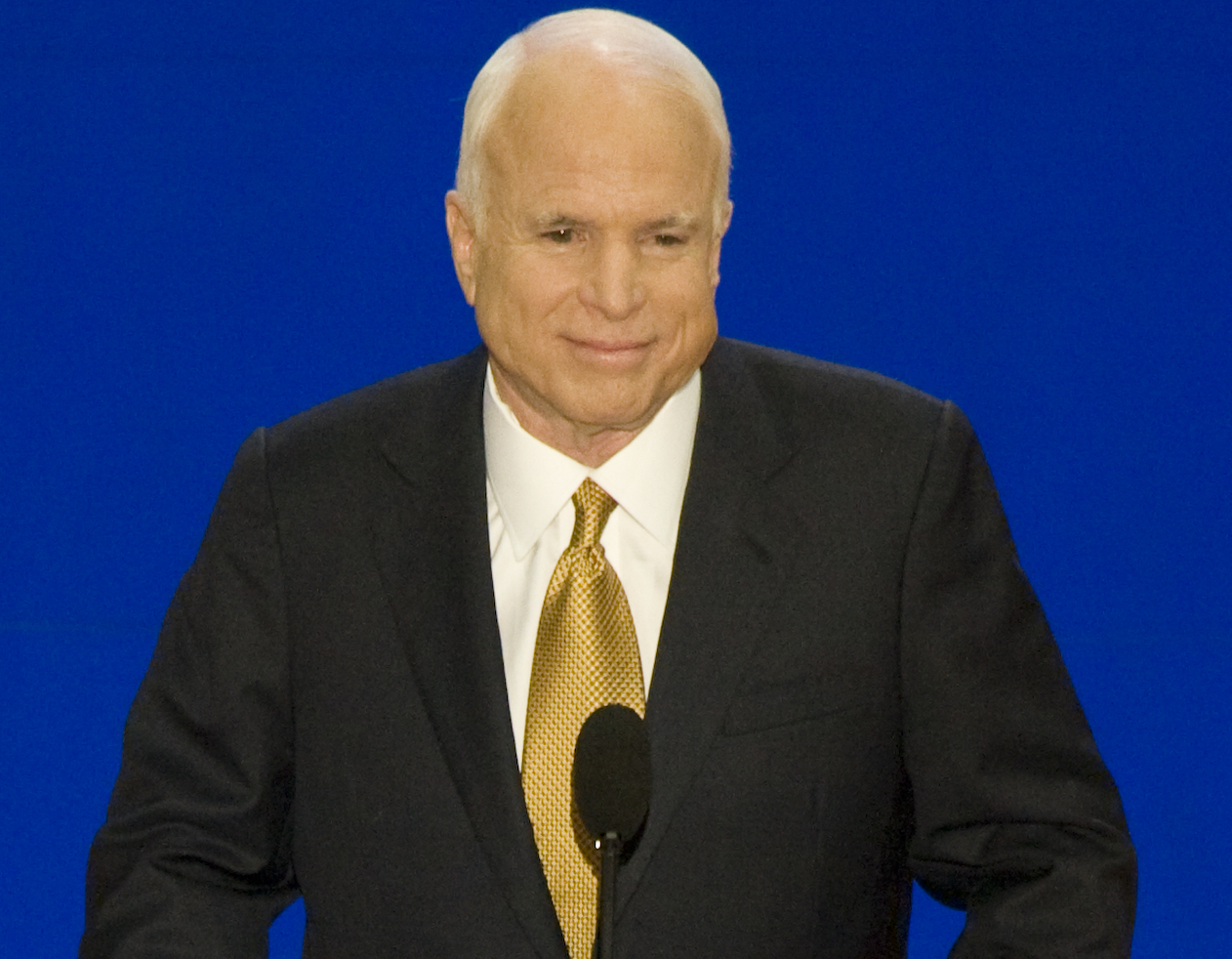
John McCain

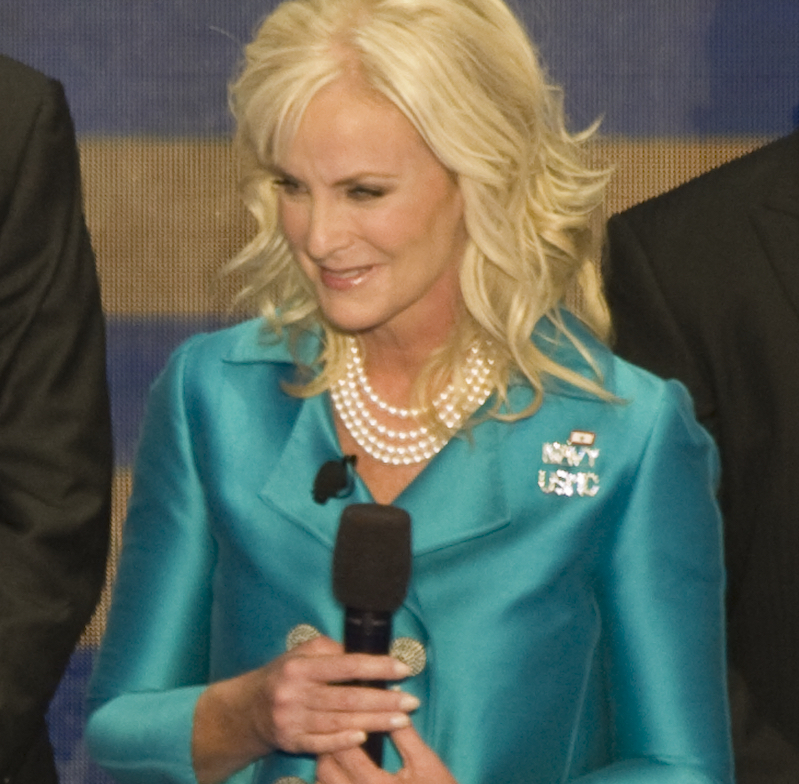
Cindy McCain

- John McCain, United States Senator from Arizona and 2008 Republican nominee for President of the United States. In his speech, McCain culminated the Republican convention by accepting his party's nomination for President of the United States. He was introduced by a video tribute.
- Cindy McCain, wife of John McCain. Before appearing on stage, a video tribute honoring Cindy McCain was shown to the delegates. She then appeared and introduced the seven McCain children. McCain portrayed her husband as a "straight talker" and a father who, by example, has passed his love of his country onto his children. She avoided criticizing Democratic nominee Barack Obama, rather she praised her husband, saying, "He has shown the value of self-sacrifice by daily example and, above all John showers us with the unconditional love and support every family dreams of. I know what his children say of him. And his courageous service to America in war and peace leaves no doubt what our forefathers would make of him." She also showed her support for vice presidential nominee Sarah Palin, all before her husband took the stage.
- Tim Pawlenty, Governor of Minnesota
- Tom Ridge, former governor of Pennsylvania
- Sam Brownback, United States senator from Kansas
- Bill Frist, former United States Senate majority leader
- Mel Martinez, United States senator from Florida
- John Ensign, United States senator from Nevada
- Lindsey Graham, United States senator from South Carolina
- Tom Cole, United States representative from Oklahoma
- Mary Fallin, United States representative from Oklahoma
- Marsha Blackburn, United States representative from Tennessee
- Aaron Schock, 27-year-old Illinois state representative; nominee for U.S. House of Representatives
- Rosario Marin, former treasurer of the United States
- Carol A. Mutter, retired United States Marine Corps lieutenant general

== Hosting city selection ==
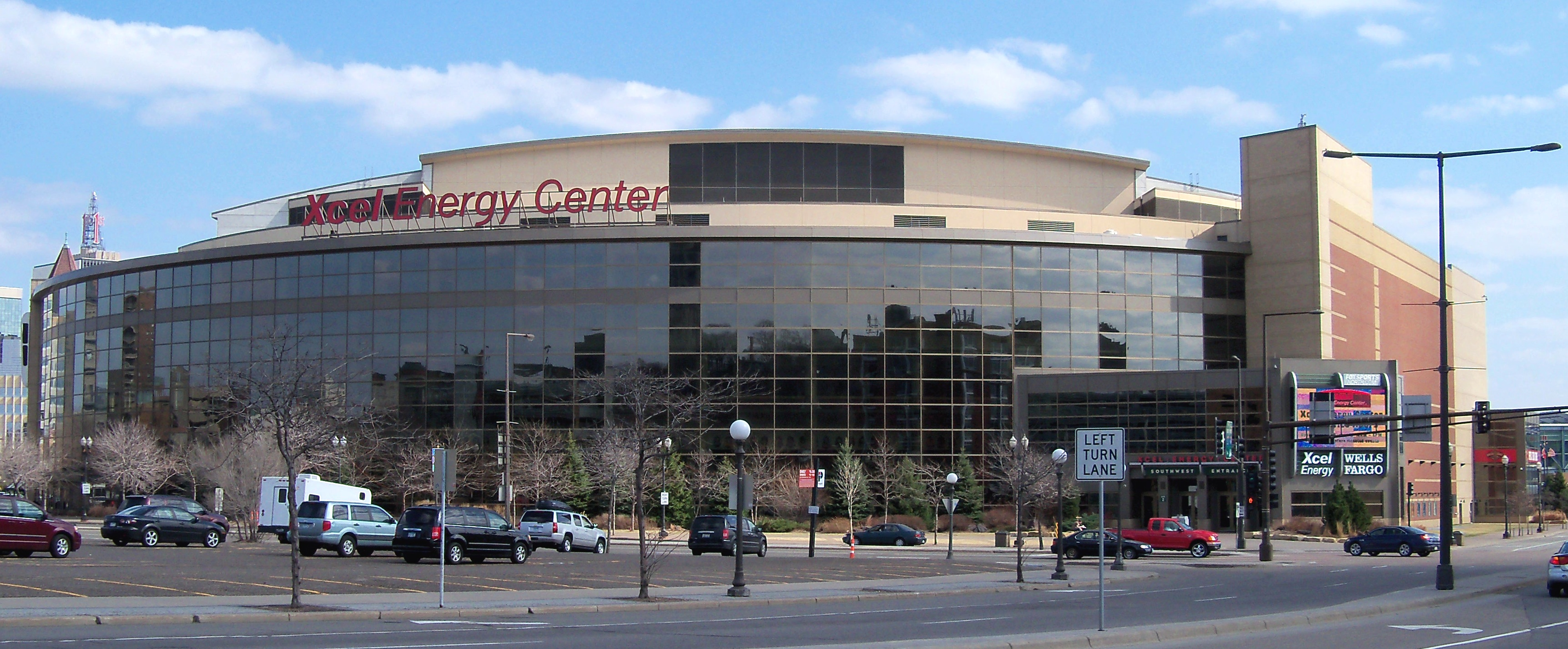
Xcel Energy Center, host venue of the convention

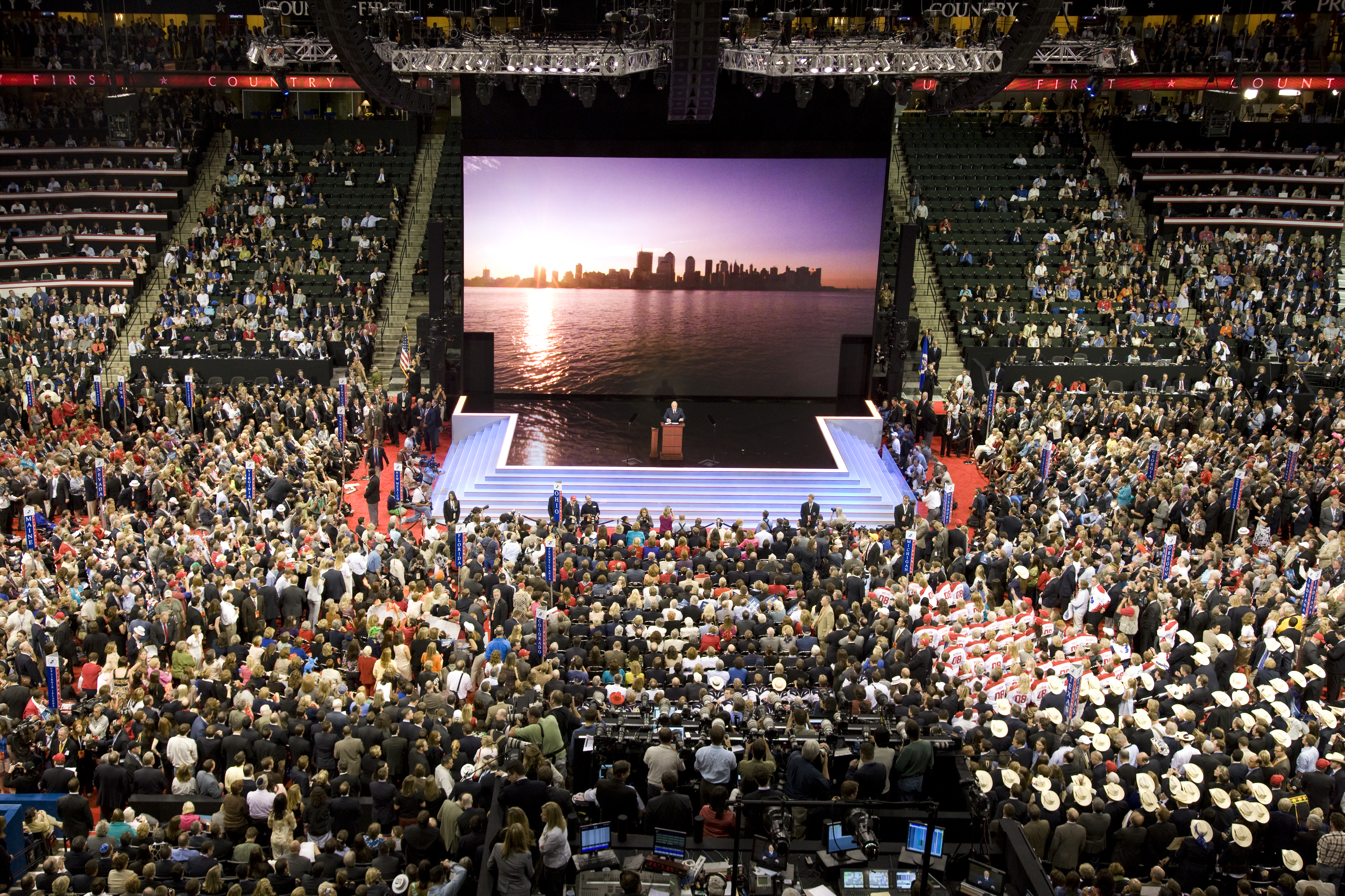
The floor of the 2008 Republican National Convention

Four cities made bids to the Republican National Committee (RNC) for proposals to host the 2008 Convention. Those cities were Cleveland, Ohio; Minneapolis-Saint Paul, Minnesota; New York City, New York; and Tampa-St. Petersburg, Florida. The RNC Selection Committee made its recommendation for Minneapolis-Saint Paul and on September 27, 2006, the RNC made its decision public that the 2008 Republican National Convention would be held in Minneapolis-Saint Paul. The RNC made their decision earlier than originally scheduled because the Democratic National Committee (DNC) also had Minneapolis-Saint Paul as a finalist among bidding cities. (After the RNC's selection, the DNC removed Minneapolis-Saint Paul from consideration which left the DNC with only two cities to choose from: New York City and Denver, Colorado.) This is the second time the Minneapolis-Saint Paul area held the Republican National Convention—the first was held in 1892.

Sites of the 2008 national presidential nominating conventions

== Scheduling ==
With the landfall of Hurricane Gustav on the U.S. Gulf Coast, the White House canceled the planned appearances of President Bush and Vice President Dick Cheney. Governors Bobby Jindal of Louisiana and Rick Perry of Texas skipped the convention to remain in their states during the hurricane's landfall. The Monday, September 1, 2008, schedule was compressed to two hours from seven. McCain called on the party to reduce partisan activities ahead of the hurricane's arrival. The Republican Party chartered a DC-9 to fly convention delegates representing the affected areas back home to their families. The last time a major hurricane struck in a Presidential-election year was Hurricane Andrew in 1992, which hit South Florida four days after the Republican Convention in Houston, Texas.

On March 26, 2008, the NFL and NBC agreed to move the kickoff time of a September 4 season-opening football game to 7:00 p.m. EDT instead of 8:30 p.m. EDT to accommodate the convention. The game ended relatively on time, at 10:01 p.m. EDT, with NBC Sports handing off to NBC News within moments of the end of the game. According to Nielsen Media Research, 38.9 million Americans watched McCain deliver his acceptance speech—a half million more than tuned in to see Obama the previous week.

== Delegate count ==
To be selected as the 2008 Republican Party Nominee, a candidate must have received the vote of 1,191 delegates. As of March 4, 2008, McCain had received the pledges of more than 1,191 delegates. Although most of those delegates were not required to vote for him, on September 3, 2008, McCain won the nomination almost unanimously.

Republican National Convention Presidential nominee vote, 2008
Candidate	Votes	Percentage
John McCain	2,343	98.44%
Ron Paul	21	0.88%
Mitt Romney	2	0.08%
Delegates that did not vote	14	0.59%
Totals	2,380	100.00%

Palin was nominated for vice president by voice vote on September 4, 2008.

== Protests ==
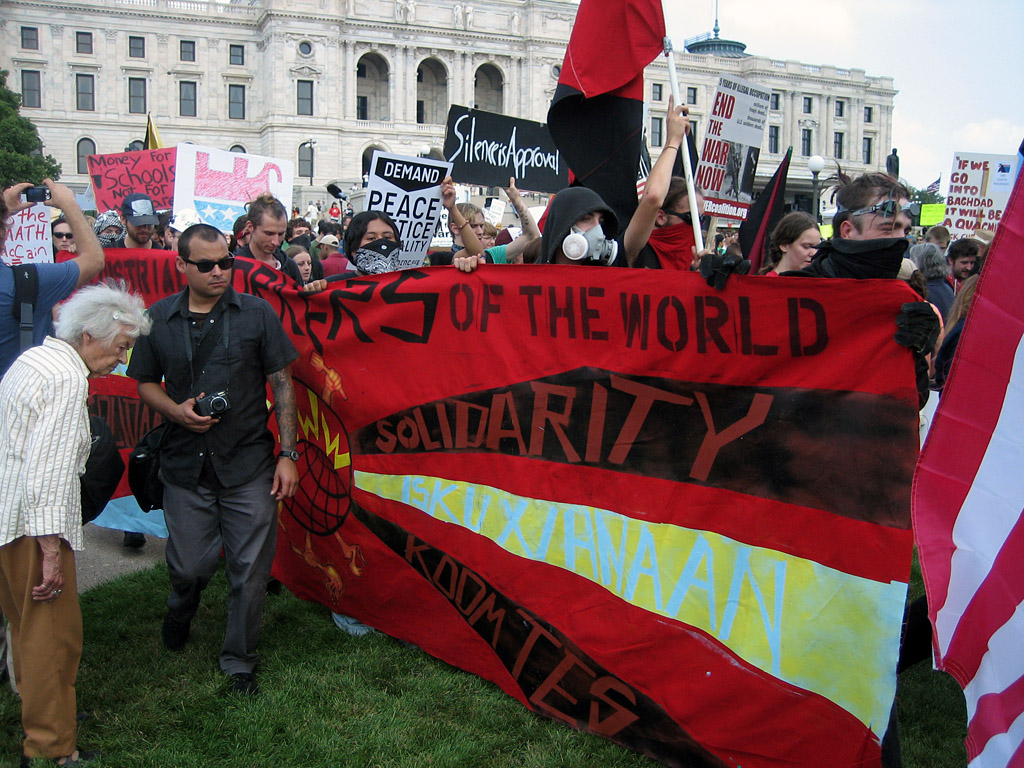
Antiwar march at the Minnesota State Capitol on September 1, 2008

Approximately 10,000 largely peaceful protesters marched against the war in Iraq and 2,000 more to end homelessness and poverty. They represented a number of organizations opposed to the Republican Administration including the Poor People's Economic Human Rights Campaign, Veterans for Peace, Iraq Veterans Against the War, Military Families Speak Out, the Teamsters, Code Pink, the American Indian Movement and the RNC Welcoming Committee. About 1,000 people in place for the third major march, and the last to be sanctioned, were stopped on Thursday, September 4, 2008, by police because they attempted to begin their march after the time their march permit expired. The Anti-War Committee, which supports nonviolent action and civil disobedience and had cooperated with anarchist groups, had organized and publicized the march to protest at the time of McCain's acceptance speech, which was in violation of the court-approved protest permit time.

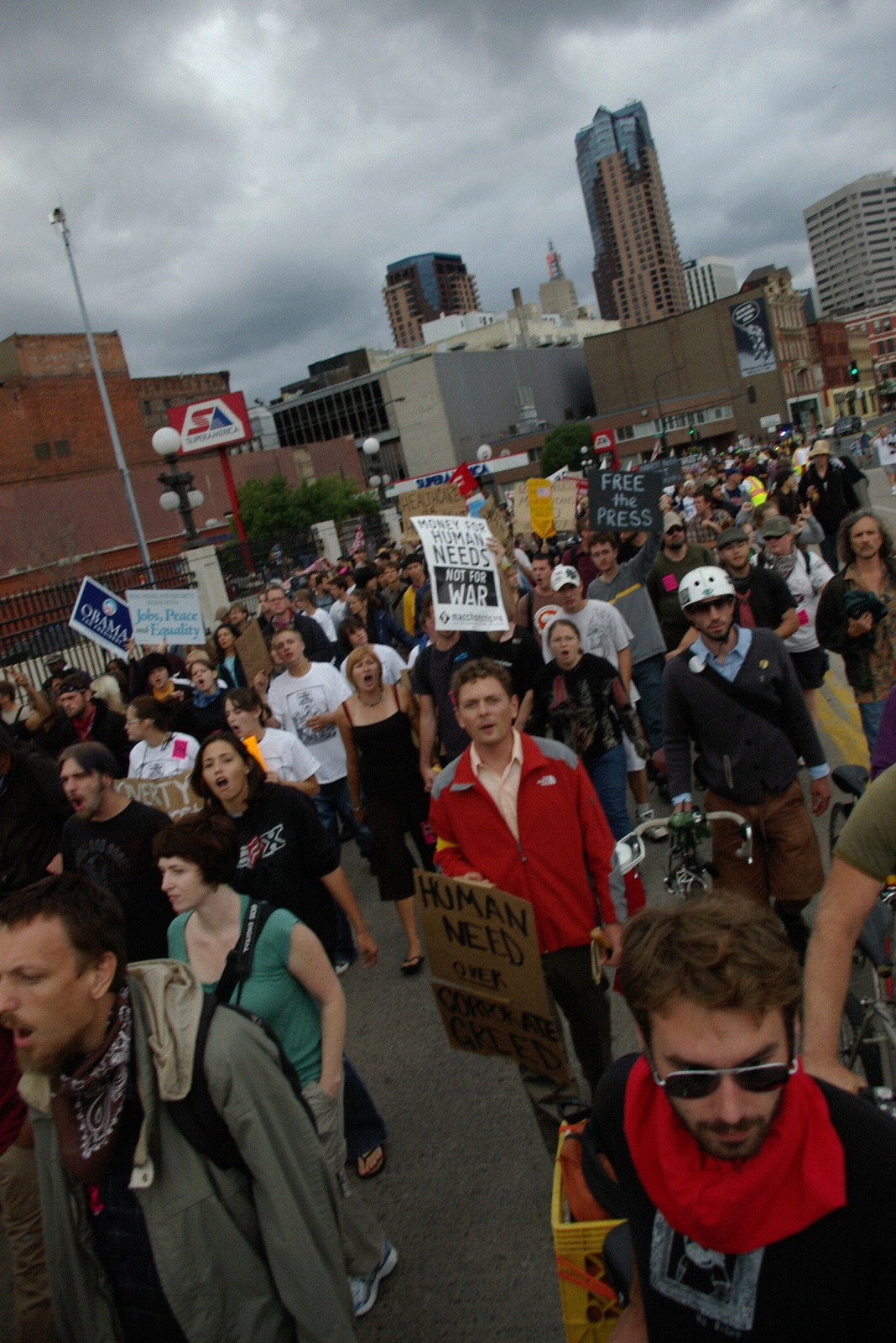
The Poor People's Economic Human Rights Campaign march to abolish poverty on September 2, 2008

Ron Paul's Campaign for Liberty and 10,000 Ron Paul supporters attended the Rally for the Republic, a protest convention on September 2, 2008, held a few miles from the Xcel Energy Center at the Minneapolis Target Center in direct contrast to the Republican National Convention.

Several groups had been preparing to protest near the convention. In early January 2008, protesters marched from the Minnesota State Capitol to the Xcel Energy Center in hopes of securing a protest permit. The Saint Paul Police Department authorized the event, but only approved the permit through July 2008. On February 8 and February 9, 2008, antiwar protesters attended a weekend conference at the University of Minnesota to discuss the protests and antiwar rally. On February 28, 2008, the Associated Press (AP) reported that the police department adopted new guidelines for the investigation of protest groups. The police department said that this did not have anything to do with the convention.

In early March 2008, the city of Saint Paul gave the first permits to protest organizers. The city had said that it was not going to follow the "New York model" for protest security, referring to the tactics the New York City Police Department used for the 2004 Republican National Convention protest activity. Later, on March 24, 2008, the antiwar group the Coalition to March on the RNC and Stop the War, sued the city, claiming their free speech and due process rights were denied by the vagueness of the permits which did not specify a permitted route for their march. On July 16, 2008, a Federal judge upheld the terms of the permit. And when the time came on September 2, 2008, police led the Poor People's Economic Human Rights Campaign for two hours on a 2.5 miles (4.0 km) trek away from the convention which had been less than 1 mile (1.6 km) from their starting point.

=== Search warrants and arrests ===
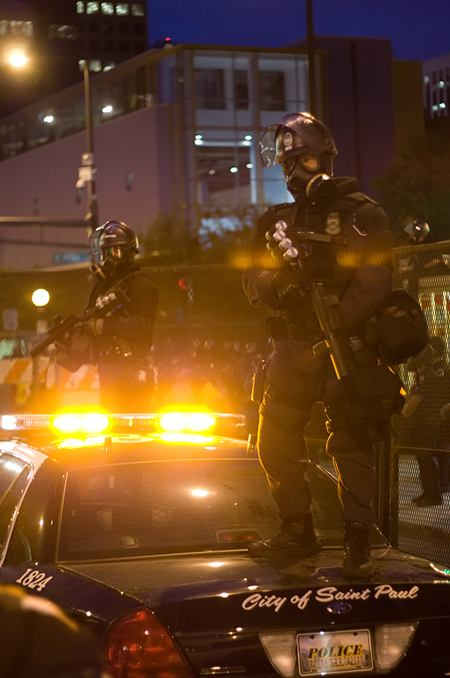
Police in downtown Saint Paul on September 2, 2008

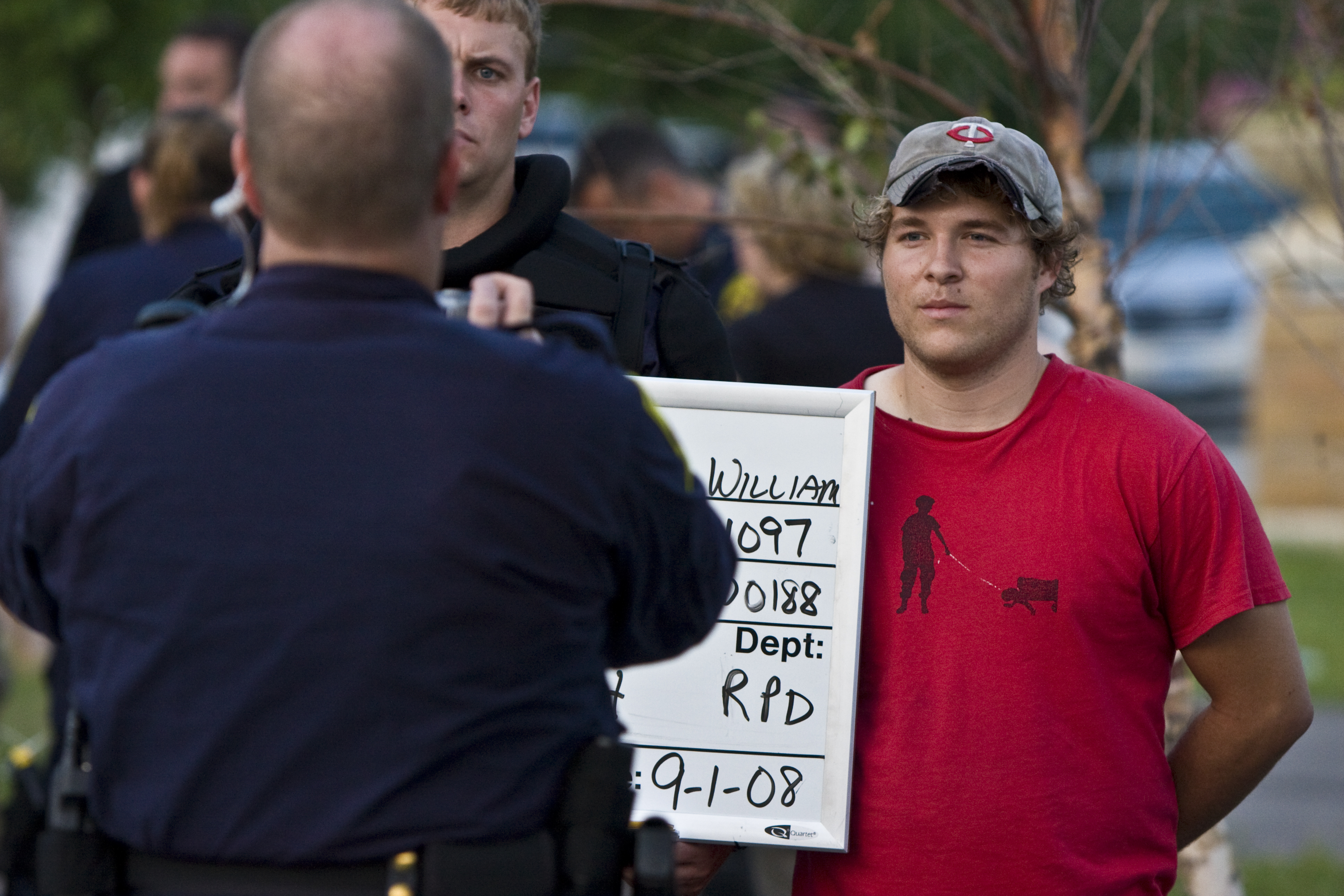
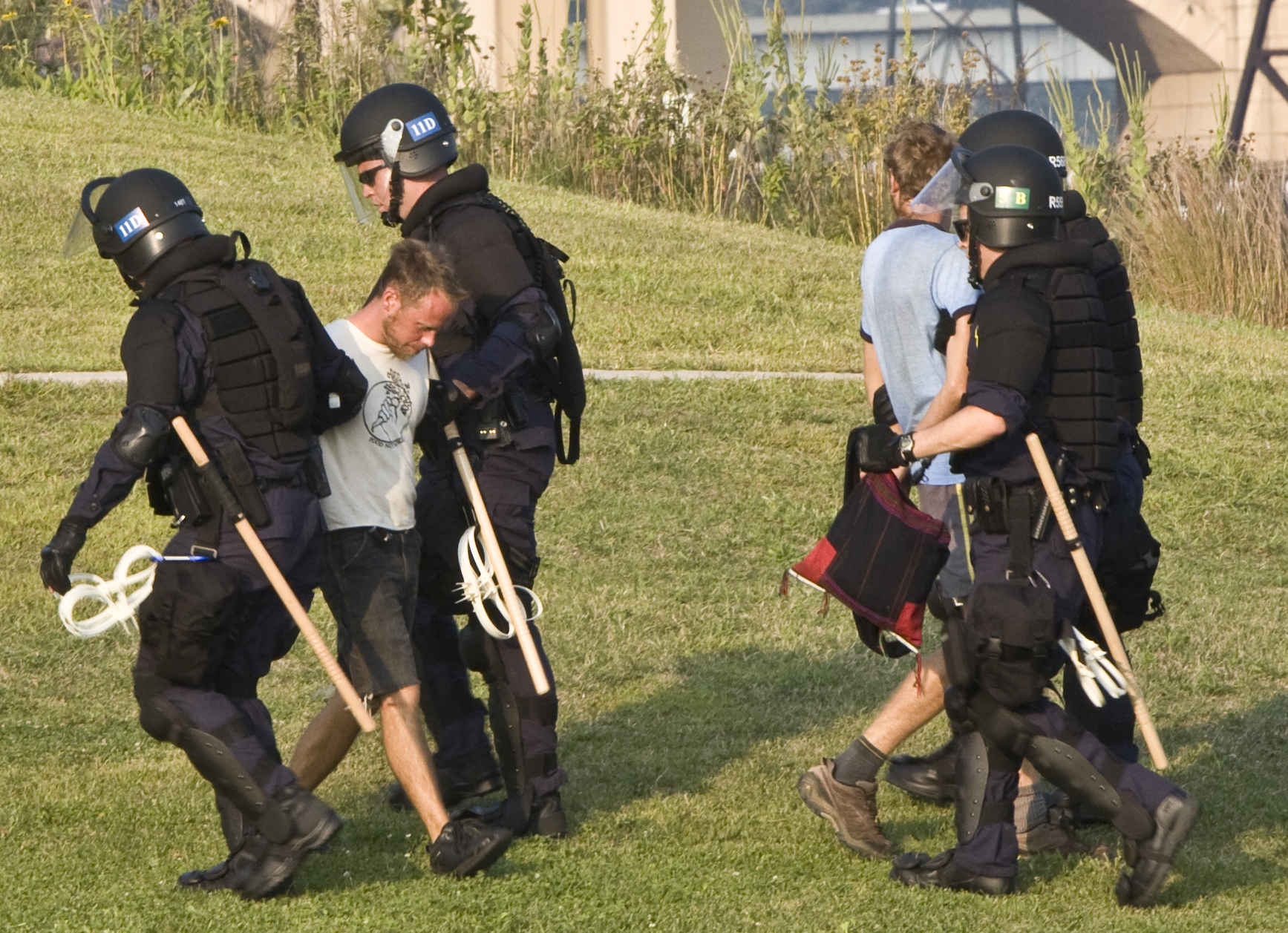
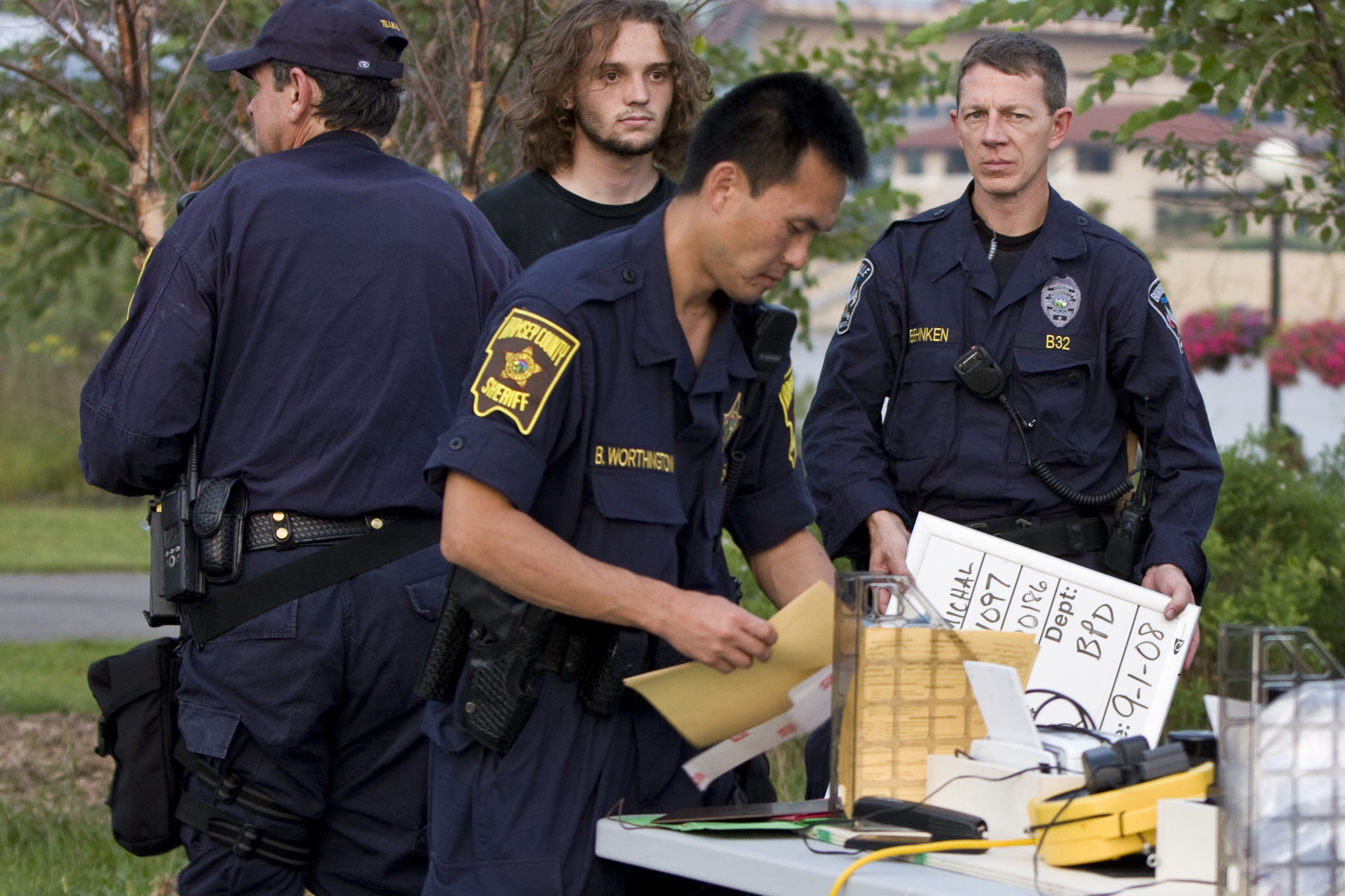
Police arresting protesters during the first-day of the convention

Before the convention began, search warrants were executed by Ramsey County Sheriff Bob Fletcher in coordination with the Federal Bureau of Investigation. Six persons who were a part of the organizing group, the RNC Welcoming Committee, were arrested when police executed search warrants on a handful of homes in Minneapolis and Saint Paul during the weekend preceding the convention.

Media outlets reported on several of the searches. Given the nature of the probable cause for the warrant applications, a district court judge authorized no-knock warrants. Police entered the homes wearing body armor with weapons drawn, which is standard for no-knock warrants. RNC Welcoming Committee members detained at the group's headquarters, located in an old theater on Saint Paul's West Side, were ultimately arrested by Ramsey County Sheriff Bob Fletcher of misdemeanor fire code violations.

On the first day of the convention, a group of protesters stood in front of approximately 30 to 40 delegates from Connecticut in an attempt to prevent them from entering the convention. Paramedics had to treat an 83-year-old member of the delegation for breathing problems when his credentials were ripped from his neck by a protester. Additionally, a black bloc smashed windows of downtown businesses and slashed the tires several police cars, lit one police car on fire, and used a garbage dumpster as a battering ram against another. About 12 protesters were arrested.

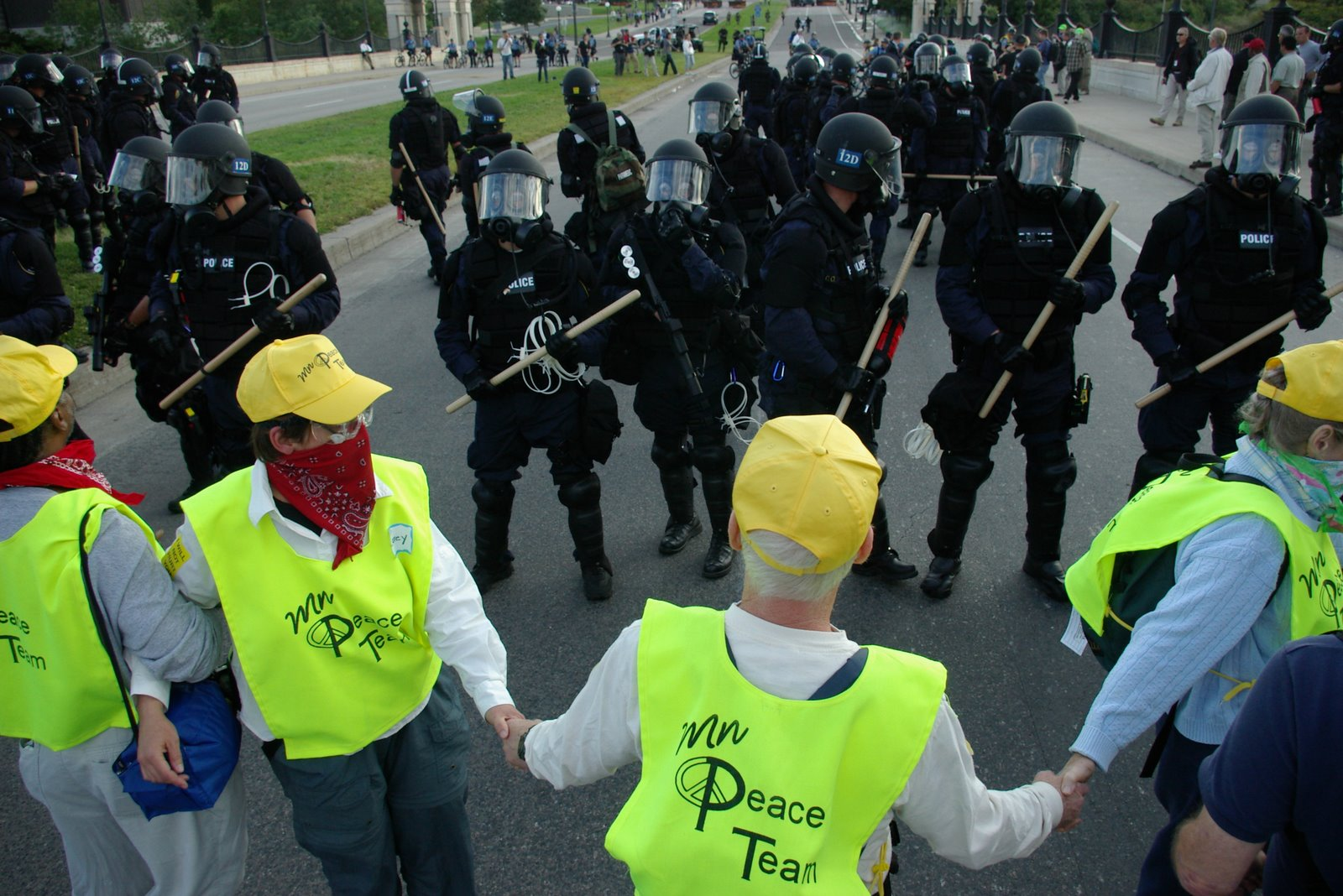
Minnesota Peace Team and police in Saint Paul on September 4, 2008

During the convention's first three days, more than 300 individuals were detained by police, including journalists, healthcare workers, and legal observers. Some were released, but nearly half received felony charges. Of these felony arrests, many cases were dropped or reviewed, sometimes for lesser charges, and about 21 were found to be prosecutable. About 102 persons were arrested for unlawful assembly at a Rage Against the Machine concert in downtown Minneapolis.

Over the four days of the convention, more than 30 journalists were arrested while reporting on the protests. The arrests included journalists from national organizations such as AP and Democracy Now!, journalists from local radio and TV stations, as well as university journalism students and advisors.

Three journalists from Democracy Now!—including principal host Amy Goodman—were detained by police during their reporting on the protests. According to a press release by Democracy Now!, Goodman was arrested after confronting officers regarding the arrest of her colleagues. The officers were in the midst of crowd control, and ordered Goodman to move back. She was arrested after refusing the officer's orders. All were held on charges of "probable cause for riot". Several news sources have criticized the arrest as unlawful and a violation of the freedom of the press, and warned of the "chilling effects" of such measures. Democracy Now! journalist Amy Goodman and producers Sharif Abdel Kouddous and Nicole Salazar prevailed in a lawsuit against the cities of Minneapolis and St. Paul and the U.S. Secret Service brought by the Center for Constitutional Rights, attorney Steven Reiss from Weil, Gotshal & Manges LLP in New York, and Albert Goins of Minneapolis. The federal lawsuit asserted that the government cannot, in the name of security, limit the flow of information by intimidating and arresting journalists who engage in constitutionally protected reporting on speech protected by the First Amendment, such as dissent or law enforcement activities. The settlement included compensation of $100,000 for the three journalists and an agreement by the St. Paul Police Department to implement a training program aimed at educating officers regarding the First Amendment rights of the press and public with respect to police operations — including police handling of media coverage of mass demonstrations — and to pursue implementation of the training program in Minneapolis and statewide.

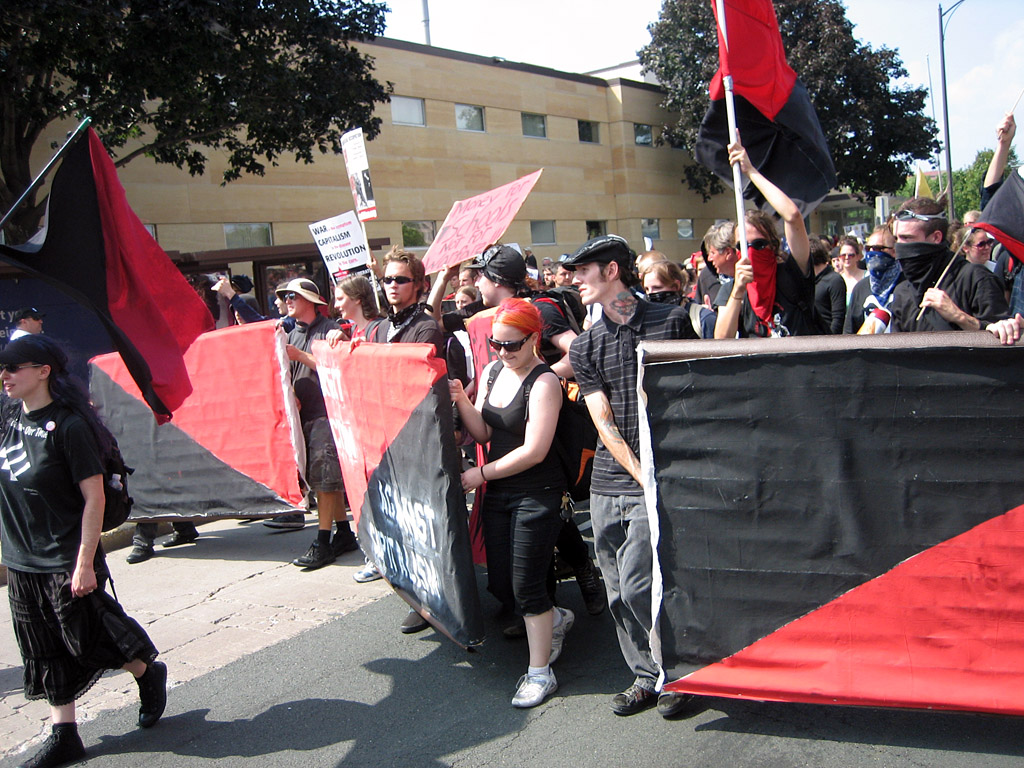
Anti-capitalist, anarchist march on the from Minneapolis on 1 September 2008 RNC

The final protest march was permitted for 2:00 to 5:00 p.m. on the final day of the convention. This meant that the last of the marchers needed to be back on capitol grounds by 5 p.m. By 4 p.m., the march had still not left the capitol grounds. Understanding that the protesters were interested in being near the Xcel Energy Center when delegates were, police offered a compromise: march leaders were told that if they started their march before 5 p.m., police would allow it to continue past the permit time. March organizers refused. When the final protest march permit expired at 5 p.m., overpasses over Interstate 94 leading into downtown from the state capitol were closed. Two hours later, when the final assembly permit on capitol grounds expired and protesters refused several commands to disperse, police used tear gas, smoke bombs, pepper spray, flash bangs, mounted police, paint marker rounds, and rubber bullets to prevent an antiwar march organized by the Anti-War Committee to march on the Xcel Energy center. This march would have been in violation of the court-approved march permits. Between 300 and 400 people were arrested or held including 19 journalists, among them AP reporters Amy Forliti and Jon Krawczynski, reporters from Twin Cities Daily Planet and The Uptake, and Paul Demko of The Minnesota Independent. Total arrests of convention protesters numbered approximately 800, although only 15 cases resulted in criminal charges. Several suits were started in U.S. District Court, claiming civil rights abuses by the St. Paul Police Department and other agencies involved in the RNC, particularly the Minneapolis Police Department and Ramsey County Sheriff's Office. Search warrants were still being granted into 2009 in relation to the events that transpired during the 2008 RNC.

=== Post-RNC convictions of protesters ===
- Bradley Neal Crowder of Midland, Texas, pleaded guilty in federal court on January 8, 2009, to one charge of possessing an unregistered firearm (as Molotov cocktails are defined under federal law) in return for prosecutors dropping two other firearm charges. Each of the three charges carried a maximum of 10 years in prison. He is still awaiting sentencing to between 30 and 46 months in prison depending on whether U.S. Chief Judge Michael J. Davis decides that he played a minor or major role in the crime. Crowder has been in jail since his September 1, 2008, arrest for disorderly conduct.
- David Guy McKay, also of Midland, Texas, was initially released on bail on February 2, 2009, after his first trial ended in a hung jury. The case never went to retrial as on March 17, McKay accepted a plea deal and plead guilty to three federal felonies: possession of an unregistered firearm (Molotov cocktails), illegal manufacture of a firearm, and possession of a firearm with no serial number, in return for the government not seeking four additional sentencing points for "intent to use" the Molotov cocktails. Based on transcripts from his first trial, McKay had a good chance of proving entrapment, but if found guilty, he could have faced 30 years in prison on the weapons charges alone. As of May 21, 2009, McKay was sentenced to 2 years in prison and a further 3 years of supervision.
- A total of twenty-one individuals were charged with felony crimes. Three pleaded guilty and charges were dropped for two people. An attempt at charging the "RNC 8" with a post-9/11 Minnesota Patriot Act statute "609.714 Crimes committed in furtherance of terrorism" was also dropped.

Both McKay and Crowder were arrested based on FBI surveillance and testimony by former-activist turned informant, Brandon Michael Darby and Andrew C. Darst, also known as "Panda," "warchyld" or Killswitch. Darst is currently being charged in Ramsey County, MN, with two felony counts of first- and second-degree burglary as well as fifth-degree assault relating to a January 11, 2009, domestic disturbance.

== See also ==
- 2008 Democratic National Convention
- 2008 Libertarian National Convention
- Drill, baby, drill
- Junkyard Empire
- 2008 Republican Party presidential primaries
- Republican National Convention
- History of the United States Republican Party
- List of Republican National Conventions
- United States presidential nominating convention
- Michael Murphy Andregg
- John McCain 2008 presidential campaign

Preceded by 2004; New York	Republican National Conventions	Succeeded by 2012; Tampa
