= The Layaways =

Indie rock band from Chicago, Illinois, USA

The Layaways are an American indie rock band, based in Chicago. The group was founded by David Harrell (vocals/guitar) who released "More Than Happy" as a solo album in 2003. Mike Porter (vocals/bass) and Nathan Burleson (drums/vocals) joined the lineup in 2004 for "We've Been Lost," the band's sophomore release. The group's third album, "The Space Between," was released in 2008, followed by "Maybe Next Year," a collection of holiday songs, in 2009. "Silence," the lead-off track from "We've Been Lost," was included on the digital version of the 2012 compilation Occupy This Album. The band's music is often described by reviewers as shoegaze or indie pop and the group has also received attention for its exploration of alternative business models and for Harrell's frequent writings about digital music economics.
