= Junkyard Empire =

American political music and action group

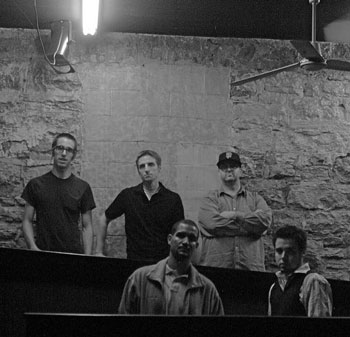
Dan Choma, Graham O'Brien, Christopher Robin Cox (left to right back), Brihanu, Bryan Berry (left to right front).

Junkyard Empire was an American political hip-hip/jazz group based in Saint Paul, Minnesota. Their style eludes categorization, mixing hip-hop, rock, jazz, and dark electronics, existing alongside the deep political revolution-focused lyrics of rapper MC Brihanu.

The band had created a large amount of recorded material and live performances, often being excluded from the mainstream press. Recognition eventually came after a show played at the No Peace for the War Makers rally on a large stage at the Minnesota State Capitol during the 2008 Republican National Convention protests. Their performance was a turning point for the band which led them to support and perform for nationally coordinated occupation protests of New York City and Washington, D.C. leading up to the global Occupy Movement.

== Early history ==
Junkyard Empire was formed in Fall 2006 as an acid jazz/hip-hop collaboration between friends Brian Lozenski (a.k.a. Brihanu) and Christopher Robin Cox. The group evolved through stylistic and instrumental experimentation. During this time, the band morphed from a jazz sextet with two horns - with Jamie Delzer on saxophone - in their first studio album, Reclaim Freedom (2007), to a rock/jazz quintet in Rise of the Wretched (2008) - always with Lozenski rapping over the top.

Over time, the band evolved more deeply into the rock-jazz sound with the addition of Steve Hogan on Bass and Cox taking on the keyboard role and amplification of the trombone. The "amplified trombone" became a strong element of Junkyard Empire's subsequent recordings and compositional direction. (Cox later would move on to multiple projects with amplified trombone at the forefront.)

As a highly politically active group, Junkyard Empire geared up for the 2008 election by campaigning, canvassing, and participating in many direct actions in protest of the 2008 Republican National Convention (RNC) in Saint Paul, Minnesota by performing an "Anti-RNC Tour," coinciding with the pre-release of their EP "Rise of the Wretched."

It was at this time that Junkyard Empire first came into local and national recognition with their performance at the "No Peace for the War Makers" on the steps of the Minnesota State Capitol during the third day of the RNC. This show was interrupted by dozens of riot cops attacking a group of bicyclists in the crowd. Tensions raised to a fever pitch, nearly to the point of rioting, all while the band improvised over the tune Wretched (from the album Rise of the Wretched), as rapper Brihanu chanted to the police "let them go." Parts of this performance were featured in the documentary "Terrorizing Dissent".

In those early years, Junkyard Empire shared the stage with Desdamona, Michael "Eyedea" Larsen, Carnage The Executioner, Blue King Brown, Broadcast Live, Boots Riley and The Coup, Los Nativos, Kill the Vultures, Toki Wright, and numerous others.

For their third studio album, the band partnered with Marc Nicolas at what was then a startup independent music label MediaRoots Music based in Santa Monica, CA. to produce Rebellion Politik (2009). Shortly after recording the material, the band and a Media Roots team embarked on a successful tour of Cuba, where they were invited by the Ministry of Culture in Havana. Marc Nicholas went on become an A&R rep at Glassnote Records and has since started his own record label called Halvetica Music.

The band's last lineup was MC Brihanu, Christopher Robin Cox, Bryan Berry, Steve Hogan, and Graham O’Brien. This was the lineup for "Acts of Humanity (2010), mixed by Brian Susko at Dharma Sound Studios (Santa Monica, CA) and mastered by Tom Garneau at Audio Active (Deephaven, Minnesota) and then their own self-produced record in 2011, called Butt Naked in the Matrix, largely considered their best work, though the least known.

Homing in on the impact of performing live during the RNC protests, Junkyard Empire traveled to New York in spring of 2010 to perform at the first annual "Sounds of Resistance" protest and direct-action rally at Union Square Park in New York City. Here they performed during a march on and subsequent occupation of the nation's leading foreclosure firm, Bank of America, on Tax Day.

In 2012, Junkyard Empire was invited to perform in Washington D.C. in support of an occupation of Freedom Plaza, located on Pennsylvania Avenue. This performance was to mark the start of the October 2011 occupation of D.C. and served as a supporting coalition for the burgeoning Occupy Movement, in fact organized long before Occupy Wall Street was a recognized movement.

== Recent events ==
Junkyard Empire had a track featured on the May 2012 release of "Occupy This Album", a benefit album for the Occupy Movement featuring 99 tracks for the 99%. Junkyard Empire's "Rebellion Politik" title track is featured alongside notable artists such as Tom Morello of Rage Against the Machine, Anti-Flag, Willie Nelson, Jackson Browne, Ani DiFranco, and others. Their well-known track "We Want" from their fourth album Acts of Humanity is now the theme song for Project Censored's radio show on Berkeley's KPFA radio.

== Political affiliations ==
Junkyard Empire performed at No Peace for the War Makers during the 2008 Republican National Convention in St. Paul, which was featured in the movie Terrorizing Descent. The band has also worked closely with The League of Pissed Off Voters (aka League of Independent Voters) and Canvassed Neighborhoods in St. Paul during the 2008 election. In addition, the group also supports the Anti-War Committee, Food Not Bombs, the World Fair Trade Organization, the Committee to Stop FBI Repression, the Earth Liberation Front (ELF), the RNC 8, the Physicians for a National Health Program, and many other revolution-minded groups.
