= RJR 94 FM =

Radio station in Jamaica

Radio Jamaica 94FM (formerly known as RJR 94FM), is a broadcast company in Jamaica with headquarters in Kingston.

== History ==
On 9 July 1950, a commercial license to operate as a subsidiary of the British Rediffusion Group was issued to the Radio Jamaica and Rediffusion Network. Initially only four medium-wave, signal transmission sites broadcast throughout the island. In 1951 wire radio service was established from a central broadcasting station. Transmissions were sent to rediffusion speaker boxes for which subscribers paid three-pence per day. To increase the listener base RJR distributed around 200 rediffusion speakers to police stations, retail stores and schools. In 1953, Jamaica became the first of the British colonies in the Caribbean to offer FM broadcasting when RJR began using the technology. By 1954, there were over 57,000 rediffusion boxes distributed throughout the country.

In 1959 Jamaica Broadcasting Corporation was founded as a public broadcasting corporation operated by the government. At that time, RJR's operating company was renamed Radio Jamaica Ltd. and the company began offering non-stop music service three years later. In 1962, RJR also introduced "Musipage" which presented live musical performances at its studios. In 1968, rediffusion became obsolete when transistor radio transmission was developed and the speaker service was discontinued. The Jamaican government acquired the station from the British Rediffusion Group in the 1970s and divested its interest through stock sales to organizations and individuals to facilitate RJR becoming a fully Jamaican-owned company. A second station playing music only was founded in 1972 and RJR expanded again in 1984, adding a third station FAME FM. In 1990, simulcast broadcasting was developed to broaden programming to include live programming on national events.

== Programming ==
The station broadcasts several programmes featuring Jamaican and international music, news, talk shows, listener questions and professional answers. Ralston McKenzie's Sunday Contact, a show that reaches out islandwide by radio for missing persons is another programme.

== Infrastructure ==
The company maintains the RJR radio channel as their flagship, plus a number of other radio channels.

== Radio personalities ==
- Ralston McKenzie (Sunday Contact show)
- Gerrard 'Gerry' McDaniel (PALAV! - Sunday afternoon magazine & talk show) & Relief Host (Hotline).
- Derrick Wilks (Sunnyside Up show)
- Paula-Ann Porter Jones (Sunnyside Up show)
- Emily Sheilds (Hotline Talk Show)
- Dr Orville Taylor (Hotline Talk Show)
- Clive Mullings (Hotline Talk Show)
- Christopher 'Jonny' Daley (Two Live Crew Show)
- Dahlia Harris (Two Live Crew Show)
- Dadrian Gordon (Beyond The Headlines: News Show)
- Dionne Jackson Miller (Beyond The Headlines: Talk Show)
