= Occupy This Album =

Compilation album by Various artists
- Released: May 15, 2012
- Genre: Pop rock
- Length: 313:09
- Label: Music for Occupy
- Producer: Jason Samel, Shirley Menard, Maegan Hayward, Alex Emanuel

Occupy This Album: 99 Songs for the 99 Percent is a four-disc compilation box set released in May 2012 through the record label Music for Occupy. The album concept and initial production were initiated by executive producer Jason Samel, who later recruited producers Maegan Hayward, Alex Emanuel and Shirley Menard to assist with the project. The set consists of 99 songs inspired by or related to the Occupy movement. Proceeds from the album went "directly towards the needs of sustaining this growing movement."

== Composition ==
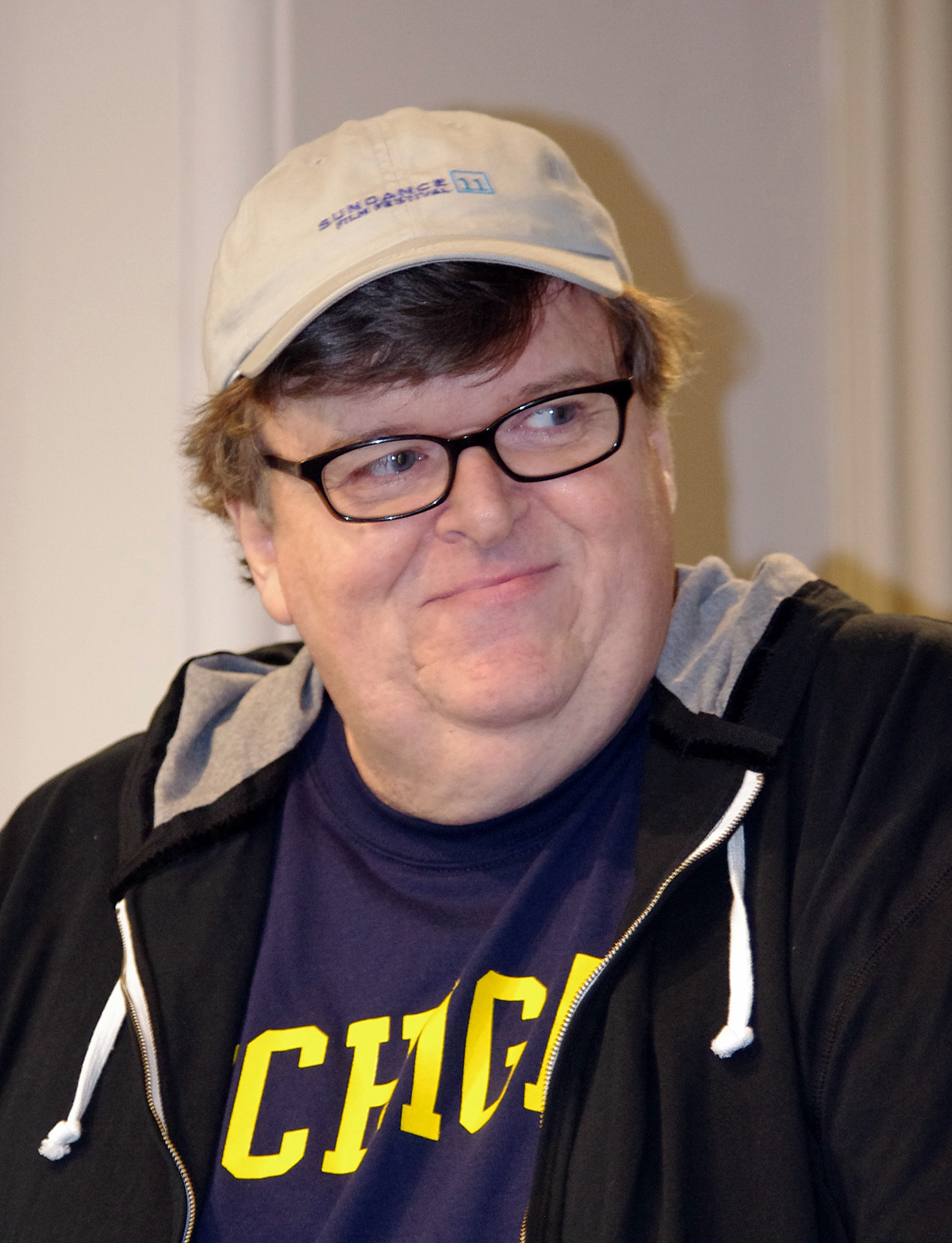
Michael Moore contributed vocals on Bob Dylan's "The Times They Are a-Changin'"

Occupy This Album is a four-disc compilation box set containing 76 songs by various artists; the digital version contains 99 tracks.

Michael Moore contributed vocals on his cover of Bob Dylan's "The Times They Are a-Changin'", produced by Jason Samel and Eric Weinrib, a song he had previously performed in his 1998 film The Big One. Moore, who had been approached to direct a music video for the compilation, is accompanied by Tom Chapin on guitar and harmonica, David Amram on piano and penny whistle, Dave Dreiwitz on bass and Kevin Twigg on drums. Approximately two thirds of the way into the track, Moore leads a human microphone chorus with the chant: "We are here to conduct an intervention".

One of the album's standout tracks "We Can't Make It Here" was written and performed by James McMurtry and recorded along with Steve Earle and Joan Baez on vocals. Critically acclaimed, it's been cited among The Nation's "Best Protest Songs Ever"; one of the "25 Best Songs of the 2000s" in Rolling Stone magazine; and declared "a triumph — the anthem of the 99%," by Bob Lefsetz.

== Promotion ==
City Winery in New York City hosted a record release party on May 8, 2012, which included performances by Matt Pless, the initial inspiration for the album.

== Critical reception ==
Professional ratings
Review scores
Source	Rating
Entertainment Weekly	B+
Mother Jones	mixed

Critical reception of the album was mixed. In his review for Entertainment Weekly, Kyle Anderson gave the compilation series a B+ rating and wrote, "the spirit of the compilation feels more positive than negative — the best that can be asked of any grassroots revolution". Josh Harkinson of Mother Jones called the album a "mashup of sometimes discordant messages" lacking in "musical cohesion", though he complimented the album's "star power" and felt the best songs were contributed by rappers.

Many reviewers criticized or complimented select tracks. Anderson's favorite songs included Ace Reporter's "propulsive" rendition of "The World Is on Fire" and Deborah Harry's "glitchy" "Safety in Numbers". Harkinson called Michael Moore's version of the Bob Dylan song "The Times They Are a-Changin'" "rotten", but considered Third Eye Blind's "If There Ever Was a Time" a "gem".

Occupy This Album won the Independent Music Awards VOX Populi vote for Best Compilation of 2012.

== Track listing ==
Disc 1

1. "Something's Got to Give" (Matt Pless) – 4:18
2. "Come On, Come On, Come On" (Jackson Browne) – 5:39
3. "Occupation Freedom" (Global Block Collective, Martinez) – 2:38
4. "People Have the Power" (Patti Smith) – 5:37
5. "Love Anthem (Only Love)" (My Pet Dragon) – 4:00
6. "The Panic Is On" (Loudon Wainwright III) – 2:56
7. "Occulture" (Cosmonaut) – 4:13
8. "Save Us" (Rain Phoenix and Papercranes) – 2:49
9. "Smile (Get Up and Sing)" (Jay Samel) – 6:50
10. "This Is What America Looks Like" (DJ Logic) – 3:37
11. "Big Little Wolfs" (Aeroplane Pageant) – 2:56
12. "Agent 99" (Alex Emanuel) – 3:26
13. "Safety in Numbers" (Deborah Harry) – 3:58
14. "Hey, Can I Sleep on Your Futon?" (Richard Barone) – 4:24
15. "Occupy Wall Street (Here Here Here)" (Black Dragon) – 2:34
16. "White Gold" (Ladytron) – 5:02
17. "Greed" (Aldort) – 3:33
18. "Against the Machine" (Adowa, Weekes) – 3:59
19. "The Young Idealists" (Cole) – 2:42
20. "A Peaceful Solution" (Amy Nelson, Willie Nelson) – 3:52

Disc 2

1. "The Times They Are a-Changin'", performed by Michael Moore (Bob Dylan) – 3:41
2. "The World Is on Fire" (Ace Reporter) – 3:08
3. "Latter Days" (Middle Eight) – 3:39
4. "Turn the Lights On" (Chroma) – 4:36
5. "Which Side Are You On?" (Ani DiFranco) – 6:05
6. "Well May the World Go" (Tao Rodriguez-Seeger) – 4:49
7. "Unified Tribes" (Thievery Corporation) – 3:14
8. "Robber Barons" (Thee Oh Sees) – 5:16
9. "Saving Up to Go Bankrupt" (Rimbaud) – 3:40
10. "Hell No (I'm Not Alright)" (Nanci Griffith) – 2:49
11. "We Stand as One" (Joseph Arthur) – 5:18
12. "Cash Machine" (Girls Against Boys) – 3:33
13. "Rebellion Politik" (Junkyard Empire) – 3:32
14. "Nothing Recedes Like Progress" (Anti-Flag) – 2:07
15. "Rebel" (Fear Nuttin' Band) – 3:36
16. "Under the Bridge" (Doe, Sobule) – 2:58
17. "Take a Stand" (Said) – 5:00
18. "The Answer" (Unkle) – 4:41
19. "World Wide Rebel Songs" (Freedom Fighter Orchestra) – 3:02
20. "If There Ever Was a Time" (Third Eye Blind) – 3:26

Disc 3

1. "Move on Fast" (Yoko Ono) – 3:41
2. "If We Live" (Build the Sun) – 3:41
3. "Fight the Good Fight" (Our Lady Peace) – 3:41
4. "I Don't Need Money" (Bonnie) – 3:09
5. "The World Is Turning" (Toots and the Maytals) – 4:13
6. "A New York Minute" (Nickodemus) – 3:38
7. "I Ain't No Brian Wilson" (Gentleman Brawlers) – 4:52
8. "Industrial Park" (Mammals) – 6:00
9. "Big Fish" (Lost City Rumblers, Yo La Tengo) – 3:21
10. "Occu-Pie" (Hayward) – 3:31
11. "Free" (Mystic Bowie) – 5:27
12. "Oye Mi Voz" (Los Cintron) – 3:49
13. "Walk On" (Wonderland) – 3:58
14. "Coney Island Winter" (Jeffreys) – 3:48
15. "China Basin Digs" (Joel Rafael, Trudell) – 3:21
16. "Walkin'" (Pimps of Joytime) – 5:38
17. "River's Gonna Rise" (Warren Haynes) – 7:59
18. "Rich Man's World" (Immortal Technique) – 4:41
19. "Staying Out and Calling In" (Danger Field) – 1:28

Disc 4

1. "We Can't Make It Here" (Joan Baez, Steve Earle, James McMurtry) – 6:03
2. "We Are" (New Party Systems) – 4:07
3. "Revolution" (Nova Echo) – 3:00
4. "Number One" (Born I Music) – 4:33
5. "Play the Greed" (Williams) – 3:08
6. "Broke Heart Blues" (Elliott) – 3:57
7. "What Are Their Names" (David Crosby, Graham Nash) – 1:19
8. "Make a Stand" (Chambers) – 5:12
9. "Better Luck Next Time" (Arnau) – 4:06
10. "All Over the World" (Arlo Guthrie) – 2:54
11. "We're the 99" (Diamond) – 4:17
12. "We Are Human" (Mike & Ruthy) – 4:08
13. "Blessed" (Williams) – 5:49
14. "Freedom of Speech" (Carter) – 4:28
15. "Reclaim" (Rejectionist Front) – 3:39
16. "Occupy (We the 99)" (Jasiri X) – 2:55
17. "Earth Division" (Mogwai) – 6:01
18. "Pulse" (OWS Drum Circle; Brendan Hunt) – 3:05
19. "The Times They Are a-Changin' [Skiffle Version]" (Moore) – 3:21 [hidden track]

Digital Only

1. Andrew Vladeck – "Chasing the Sun"
2. Greg Smith and The Broken English – "Livin' Like a Joker"
3. Aliza Hava – "Rise"
4. The Occubility Bros. – "Crashed IT, Stashed IT" *
5. Chris Pierce – "Invisible People"
6. Amanda Palmer – "Ukulele Anthem" *
7. Nadirah Shakoor – "Tree of Life"
8. Hanne Hukkelberg – "On My Wall"
9. Jason White – "Little Pieces of Plastic"
10. mfmadness – "Never Be Defeated"
11. Renegade Creation – "Greedy Life" *
12. Jesse Lenat – "99%"
13. The Swedes – "On The Dole"
14. Bill Mlotok – "Brazilia" *
15. Marcus Blake – "Don't Taser Me, Bro!"
16. Angels of Vice – "We Are The 99″
17. The Layaways – "Silence"
18. Mother Feather – "Mother Feather" *
19. Thorin Caristo – "Common Man" *
20. Machan – "Everyday"
21. Vannucci (feat. Robert Brentley) – "Crashing Down" *
22. David Amram – "Time to Occupy" *
- Previously unreleased

Track listing adapted from Allmusic.

== Personnel ==
- Gabriel Acosta-Cohen – Percussion, Vocals
- C. C. Adcock – Mixing, Producer
- Aeroplane Pageant – Composer, Producer
- Gabriel Aldort – Arranger, Composer, Piano, Vocals
- Miguel Alvarado – Saxophone
- Elijah Amitin – Beats, Composer, Producer
- David Amram – Penny Whistle, Piano, Vocals
- Matt Anthony – Mixing
- Anti-Flag – Composer, Engineer, Percussion, Producer, Various
- Michael Areethituk – Guitar
- Jennie Arnau – Composer, Guitar, Vocals
- Joseph Arthur – Composer
- Barny – Engineer, Mixing
- Richard Barone – Bass, Composer, Guitar, Vocals
- Jack Barrett – Group Member
- Basic Tracks – Engineer
- Ray Benson – Composer, Guitar (Acoustic), Tambourine
- Jeff Berksley – Percussion
- Jeremy Bernstein – Vocals
- Bryan Berry – Composer
- Matthew Billy – Composer, Additional Guitar (Acoustic), Mixing, Producer
- Craig Bishop – Hammond B3, Horn
- Black Dragon – Percussion, Vocals
- Cindy Blackman – Drums
- Norm Block – Drums
- Julie B. Bonnie – Composer
- Jason Borger – Piano
- Born I Music – Composer
- Mark Bosch – Guitar (Electric), Organ, Piano, Producer
- Dakota Bowman – Assistant Engineer
- Gary Braglia – Composer, Guitars
- Eric Brigmond – Keyboards
- Neil Brockbank – Engineer
- Bassy Bob Brockman – Mixing
- Brooklyn Youth Chorus – Choir, Chorus
- Iddan Brown – Vocals
- Rick Brown – Drums, Vocals
- Jackson Browne – Composer, Producer, Vocals
- Malik Burke – Composer
- Fernando Bustamente – Composer, Producer
- Ray Calendar – Trumpet
- Fitzroy Campbell – Composer
- Candy John Carr – Bongos, Drums, Percussion
- Clifford Carter – Organ
- Kanaska Carter – Composer, Guitar, Vocals
- Elaine Caswell – Vocals (Background)
- Alecia Chakour – Vocals (Background)
- Dylan Chambers – Composer, Producer
- Lester Chambers – Producer, Spoken Word
- Tom Chapin – Guitar, Harmonica, Vocals
- Chauncey Yearwood – Composer
- Dan Choma – Composer
- Jay Chung – Composer
- Cristobal Cintron – Composer, Guitar, Percussion, Vocals
- Rafael Cintron – Bass, Composer, Guitar, Vocals
- Gavin Clark – Vocals
- Pablo Clements – Composer, Group Member
- Reuben Cohen – Mastering
- Cole El Saleh – Keyboards
- Jane Cole – Drums
- Lloyd Cole – Composer, Producer
- Steve Connely – Producer
- John Conte – Bass
- Matt Cooker – Cello
- Christopher Cox – Composer
- David Crosby – Composer, Producer, Vocals
- Tim Curry – Vocals (Background)
- Brian Daigle – Composer
- Daniel Lancaster – Guitar, Vocals
- Jay Dee Daugherty – Drums
- Dannielle DeAndrea – Vocals
- Michael DeLorenzo – Drums
- Phil Demetro – Mastering
- Grady Dennis – Tambourine
- Rick DePofi – Hammond B3, Horn, Horn Arrangements, Sax (Tenor)
- Lauren Diamond – Composer, Vocals
- Cedric Diaz – Keyboards
- Paul Dieter – Engineer, Mixing
- Ani DiFranco – Composer, Producer, Vocals
- Frank DiNardo – Vocals
- DJ Logic – Producer, Turntables
- John Doe – Guitar, Vocals
- Dave Dreiwitz – Bass (Upright), Vocals
- Henrik Drescher – Artwork
- Chuck Dunham – Vocals
- John Dwyer – Composer
- Bob Dylan – Composer
- Marshal Dylon – Keyboards
- Robin Eaton – Composer
- Chris Edwards – Keyboards
- Dylan Egon – Artwork
- Jenny Electrik – Moog Synthesizer, Theremin
- Ronny Elliott – Composer
- Alex Emanuel – Art Direction, Bass, Composer, Drums, Guitar, Guitar (Bass), Liner Notes, Photography, Producer, Sleeve Photo, Vocal Harmony, Vocals
- Evan Bradford – Engineer, Guitar, Keyboards, Mastering, Mixing, Producer, Vocals
- David First – Arranger, Composer, Guitar, Producer, Vocals
- Alexis Fleisig – Drums
- Chris Fletcher – Bass
- Guy Forsyth – Harmonica
- Ruthie Foster – Vocals (Background)
- Mike Fowler – Bass
- Becca Fox – Group Member
- Greg Fox – Drums
- Justin Francis – Mixing, Percussion, Various
- Jay Frederick – Drums
- Paul Frye – Engineer, Mixing, Producer
- Glenn Fukunaga – Bass
- Don Fury – Engineer, Mastering, Producer
- Bernard Gann – Bass
- Sue Garner – Guitar, Vocals
- Chris Gehringer – Mastering
- Stephen George – Engineer, Mixing, Producer
- Mass Giorgini – Mastering
- Girls Against Boys – Composer
- Brian Gitkin – Composer
- Mick Glossop – Mixing
- Jodi Gold – Vocals
- Mark Goldenberg – Guitar
- Eric Gorman – Remixing
- Chris Grainger – Engineer
- Alex Grey – Artwork
- Brian Griffin – Drums, Percussion
- J. Griffin – Composer
- James Griffith – Vocals
- Nanci Griffith – Composer, Guitar (Acoustic), Producer, Vocals
- Robert Grossman – Back Cover
- Steve Hegener - Bass
- Clara Guererro – Vocals
- Joe Guerra – Bass, Vocals
- Clara Guerrero – Composer
- Abe Guthrie – Keyboards
- Annie Guthrie – Vocals
- Arlo Guthrie – Composer, Keyboards, Vocals
- Krishna Guthrie – Guitar
- Sarah Lee Guthrie – Vocals
- Patrick Guyers – Drums
- Nigel Hall – Keyboards
- Terry Hall – Drums
- Nick Hallett – Vocals
- Patrick Hambrick – Guitar
- Caleb Hanks – Composer, Producer, Vocals
- Deborah Harry – Composer
- J. Walter Hawkes – Trombone
- Warren Haynes – Composer, Guitar, Vocals
- Harry Hayward – Composer
- Harry Alexander Hayward – Composer
- Maegan Hayward – Liner Notes, Producer
- Jacob Hempbill – Composer
- Brett Hestla – Bass, Guitar, Producer, Vocals (Background)
- Frederick Hibbert – Composer
- Terrence Higgins – Drums
- Mira Hirsch – Vocals
- Matt Hixon – Bass, Vocals
- Ron Holloway – Sax (Tenor)
- Sonny Hopkins – Drums
- Georgia Hubley – Drums, Vocals
- Daniel Hunt – Producer
- Kevin Hunter – Mandolin
- Emma Ikediashi – Composer
- Illspokinn – Vocals
- Immortal Technique – Composer
- Victor Indrizzo – Drums
- Rami Jaffee – Organ (Hammond), Piano
- Eli Janney – Bass, Engineer, Vocals (Background)
- Jasiri X – Composer
- Garland Jeffreys – Composer, Guitar (Acoustic), Producer, Vocals
- Hezekiah Jenkins – Composer
- Stephan Jenkins – Composer, Producer
- Carl Johnson – Guitar
- Ron Johnson – Bass
- Karen Johnstone – Keyboards, Vocals
- Jesse Jones – Vocals
- Andre Jonson – Composer, Producer
- Harold Jorge – Vocals
- Martin Jørgensen – Group Member
- Ira Kaplan – Guitar, Vocals
- Brian Karp – Bass
- Lori Karpay – Liner Notes
- Mike Katzman – Keyboards, Organ
- Lenny Kaye – Guitar, Vocals
- Brian Kelly – Composer, Guitar, Vocals
- Donna Kelly – Drums
- Andre Kelman – Assistant
- Maura Kennedy – Composer, Guitar, Producer, Tambourine, Vocals (Background)
- Pete Kennedy – Bass, Engineer, Guitar (Electric), Producer
- Jason Kibler – Composer
- Kid Loco – Producer
- Shelley King – Vocals (Background)
- Mike Kiramarios – Saxophone
- Willie Klein – Guitar, Vocals
- Lauren Kolesinskas – Artwork
- Dan Komin – Bass
- Chris Kuklis – Guitar
- Dhruv Kumar – Vocals
- Bret Kunash – Vocals
- Tyler Kweder – Vocals
- Jason Lader – Mixing, Producer
- Ladytron – Composer, Producer
- Rich Lamb – Engineer
- Tallinn Lamonaca – Drums, Percussion
- James Lavelle – Composer, Group Member
- Ian Lawrence – Composer
- Frosty Lawson – Horn
- Greg Leisz – Guitar (Electric)
- Zack Leopold – Group Member
- Alan Lerner – Drums
- Cynik Lethel – Composer, Producer
- Richard Levengood – Engineer
- Pete Levin – Hammond B3
- Mauricio Lewak – Drums
- Tom Lewandowski – Group Member
- Corey Lima – Composer
- Little Girl – Composer
- Daniel Littleton – Vocals
- Michael Lowry – Vocals
- Brian Lozenski – Composer
- Gavin Lurssen – Mastering
- Michael Patrick Lyons – Liner Notes
- Machan Taylor – Vocals (Background)
- Kevin Madigan – Engineer, Mixing
- Matthew Mallol – Guitar
- Kyp Malone – Vocals
- The Mammals – Composer
- John Paul Manley – Composer, Guitar, Vocals
- Adam Mantovani – Bass
- Colin Marston – Engineer
- George Martinez – Composer, Vocals
- Jeff Mattson – Guitar
- David Maurice – Composer, Engineer, Mixing, Moog Bass, Producer
- Val McCallum – Guitar (Electric)
- Scott McCloud – Guitar, Vocals
- Kevin McCormack – Bass
- Pat McInerney – Percussion, Producer, Vocals (Background)
- Thomas McIntyre – Drums
- Eric Busta - Drums
- Greg McMullen – Guitar
- David McTiernan – Keyboards, Vocals (Background)
- Shirley Menard – Legal Advisor, Liner Notes, Producer
- Rich Mercurio – Drums, Engineer, Percussion
- Michael Merenda – Bass, Composer, Drums, Engineer, Guitar, Mixing, Vocals
- Ralph Merigliano – Keyboards
- Todd Michaelsen – Composer, Engineer, Programming, Various, Vocals
- The Middle Eight – Composer
- Howard Miller – Composer
- Kyle Miller – Assistant
- Paul Miller – Guitar
- Alethea Mills – Vocals
- John Mills – Horn Arrangements, Saxophone
- George Mitchell – Bass
- Matthew Moadel – Drums
- Mogwai – Composer
- Michael Moore – Vocals
- Tom Morello – Composer
- Barbara Jean Morrison – Composer
- James MsNew – Bass, Vocals
- Music for Occupy – Mixing, Producer
- Seth Mysterka – Guitar
- Mystic Bowie – Vocals
- Lee Nadel – Bass
- Dafna Naphtali – Vocals
- Mike Napolitano – Mixing, Producer
- Graham Nash – Producer, Vocals
- Amy Nelson – Composer
- Chris Nelson – Tambourine, Vocals
- Willie Nelson – Composer
- Ted Niceley – Producer
- Jesse Nichols – Engineer
- Nickodemus – Composer
- Charles W. Nieland – Composer
- Butch Norton – Drums, Percussion
- Oz Noy – Guitar
- Graham O'Brien – Composer
- Liz O'Donnell – Vocals
- Caitlin Oliver-Gans – Group Member
- Jason Olshan – Composer, Guitar, Vocals
- Yoko Ono – Composer
- Our Lady Peace – Composer, Producer
- Rich Pagano – Drums, Mixing
- Phil Palazzolo – Mixing
- David Palmer – Tack Piano
- Karen Pals – Administration
- Jon Patton – Mandolin
- Barry Perlman – Legal Advisor
- Michael Perlman – Composer, Vocals
- Jack Petruzzelli – Guitar, Vocals
- Doug Pettibone – Guitar, Mandolin
- Rain Phoenix – Composer, Guitar (Acoustic), Vocals
- Brendan Picone – Bass
- Matt Pierce – Vocals
- Roni Pillischer – Assistant, Drums, Vocals
- Sam Pitt-Stoller – Group Member, Guitar (Acoustic)
- Mark Plati – Additional Production, Synthesizer
- Steve Plekan – Bass
- Matt Pless – Composer, Cover Art, Guitar, Harmonica, Vocals
- Zac Pless – Bass, Drums
- Jason Polo – Guitar
- Dirk Powell – Engineer
- Bob Power – Mastering
- Daniel Quinn – Vocal Harmony
- Rabbi Darkside – Vocals
- Jamaica Rafael – Violin, Vocals
- Joel Rafael – Composer, Guitar, Producer, Vocals
- Jeff Railsback – Vocals
- Chris Reagan – Composer
- The Real Live Show – Vocals
- Florence Reece – Composer
- Mike Rimbaud – Composer, Engineer, Guitar, Harmonica, Mixing, Organ, Producer, Vocals
- Tao Rodriguez-Seeger – Composer
- Jay Rodriguez – Saxophone
- Michelle Rogers – Artwork, Liner Notes
- Anthony Russo – Artwork
- Sadat X – Composer, Vocals
- Godfather Sage – Composer, Producer
- Stephan Said – Composer, Guitar (Acoustic), Vocals
- Stephanie St. John – Vocals
- Jason Samel – Executive Producer, Liner Notes, Mixing, Producer
- Jay Samel – Composer, Djembe, Guitar (Acoustic), Producer, Vocals
- David Sanger – Drums
- Nick Sansano – Mixing, Producer
- Michael Sappol – Composer
- Paul Savage – Engineer, Mixing
- Johnny Lee Schell – Engineer
- Ric Schnupp – Engineer, Mixing
- Luke Schwartz – Bass, Vocals
- Pete Seeger – Composer
- Billy Seidman – Arranger, Guitar, Producer, Vocals
- Samuel Sellers – Composer
- Robin Setal – Bass
- Tony Shanahan – Bass, Vocals
- Yousif Sheronick – Percussion
- Kendall Small – Vocals (Background)
- Fred Smith – Composer
- Godfrey Smith – Composer
- Patti Smith – Composer, Vocals
- Christopher Snyder – Bass, Composer, Guitar, Mixing, Producer, Vocals
- Jill Sobule – Composer, Guitar, Vocals
- Paul Spitz – Spoken Word
- Starna Productions – Producer
- Aaron Steele – Drums
- Chavonne Stewart – Vocals
- Brian Susko – Composer, Mixing, Producer
- David Sutton – Bass
- James Swinburne – Saxophone
- Johnny Temple – Bass
- Thee Oh Sees – Composer
- Jim Thomson – Group Member
- Kevin Tooley – Drums
- John Trudell – Composer, Spoken Word
- Kevin Twigg – Drums, Vocals
- Ruthy Ungar – Vocals
- Unkle – Producer
- Scott Vanderpool – Producer
- John Wade – Drums
- Loudon Wainwright III – Adaptation, Arranger, Guitar, Producer, Vocals
- Matthew Walsh – Composer, Engineer, Group Member, Mixing, Producer
- Don Was – Bass
- Jameson Watral – Vocals
- Tim Watson – Bass
- Dave Way – Engineer
- Taj Weekes – Composer
- Eric Weinrib – Producer, Vocals
- Jason White (singer-songwriter) - Composer, Vocals, Guitar
- Dar Williams – Composer
- Lucinda Williams – Composer, Guitar (Acoustic), Vocals
- Hal Willner – Producer
- Brandon Wind – Guitar (Rhythm)
- Carolyn Wonderland – Composer, Guitar, Trumpet, Vocals, Vocals (Background)
- Chris Woodhouse – Engineer, Mixing
- Ayler Young – Fender Rhodes
- Jeff Young – Organ, Piano, Vocals

Credits adapted from Allmusic.

== See also ==
- Music and politics
- Occupy movement in the United States
- Reactions to the Occupy movement
- We are the 99%
- Jason Samel – Executive producer of *Occupy This Album*

== Charts ==
Chart (2012)	Peak position
US Top Current Albums (Billboard)	162
US Compilation Albums (Billboard)	7
