= Press Association of Jamaica =

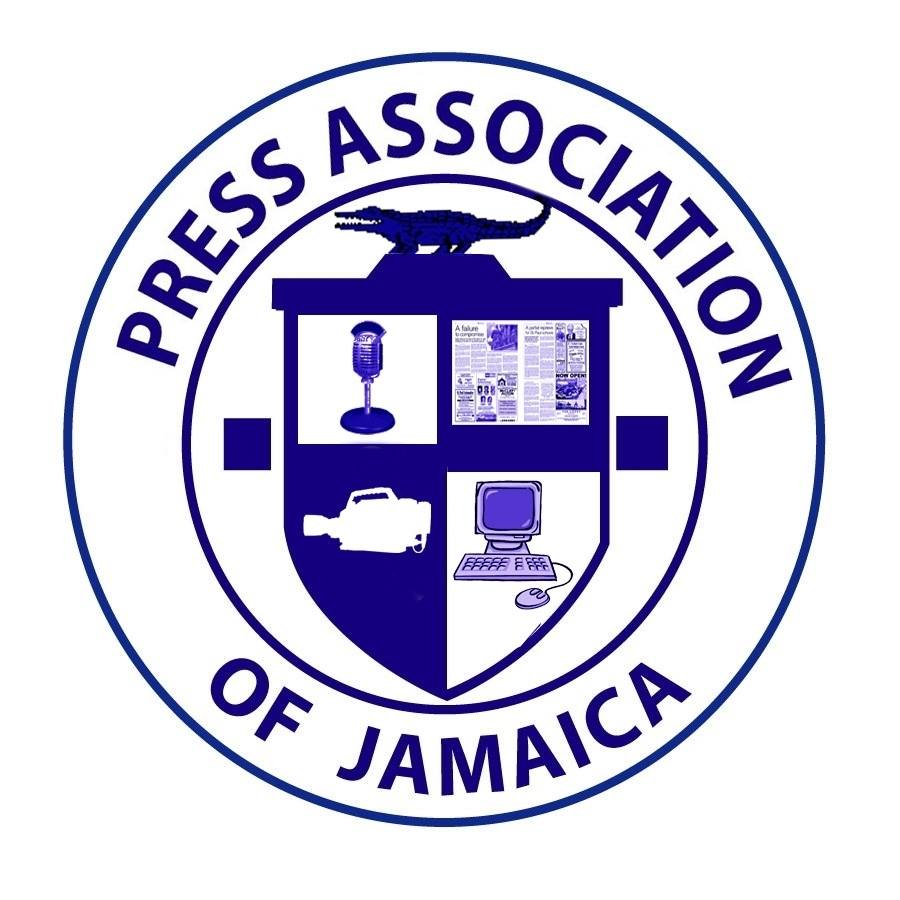
- Official seal of the Press Association.
- Formation: 1943
- Founder: Evon Blake and Wyatt Bryce
- Headquarters: Kingston, Jamaica

The Press Association of Jamaica (PAJ) is a non-governmental organization based in Kingston, Jamaica.

== History ==
Formed in 1943 by Spotlight Magazine editor and publisher Evon Blake and Wyatt Bryce, the PAJ "is dedicated to the best interest of democracy and press freedom in Jamaica. The PAJ is organized and operated exclusively for the furtherance of the education and professional status of its members."
