= Common Ground =

Common Ground may refer to:

== Books and periodicals ==
- Common Ground (Lukas book), by J. Anthony Lukas
- Common Ground (magazine), a literary magazine published quarterly between 1941 and 1949
- Common Ground (memoir), by Canadian politician Justin Trudeau

== Film ==
- Common Ground (1916 film), a silent film starring Marie Doro
- Common Ground (2000 film), a Showtime television movie
- Common Ground (2002 film), directed by Adolfo Aristarain
- Common Ground (2023 film), a documentary film about regenerative farming

== Music ==
=== Albums and EPs ===
- The Common Ground, by Herbie Mann, or the title instrumental, 1960
- Common Ground, by Tom Chapin, 2001
- Common Ground, by Mazgani, 2013
- Common Ground, by Kathryn Tickell, 1988
- Common Ground (Above & Beyond album), or the title song, 2018
- Common Ground (Big Big Train album), or the title song, 2021
- Common Ground (EP), or the title song, by Andy McKee, 2009
- Common Ground (Gary Burton album), or the title song, 2011
- Common Ground (Leama & Moor album), 2006
- Common Ground (Paul Winter album), or the title song, 1978
- Common Ground (Richie Havens album), 1983
- Common Ground (Rhythm Corps album), or the title song, 1988
- Common Ground: Dave & Phil Alvin Play and Sing the Songs of Big Bill Broonzy, by Dave and Phil Alvin, 2014

=== Songs ===
- "Common Ground (Get It Goin' On)", a song by A Tribe Called Quest from The Love Movement
- "Common Ground" (song), a 2023 song by Jack Harlow

== Organizations ==
- Common Ground (Australia), a non-profit providing education about Indigenous Australians, founded by Rona Glynn-Mcdonald
- Common Ground (New York City), a non-profit supportive housing provider
- Common Ground (Seattle), a Seattle-based nonprofit affordable housing developer
- Common Ground (United Kingdom), promoting local distinctiveness
- Common Ground Collective, a network of volunteer organizations supporting New Orleans
- Common Ground Festival, an underground punk festival in the UK
- Common Ground Health Clinic, a non-profit, free clinic in New Orleans
- Common Ground Music Festival, an event held annually in Lansing, Michigan, U.S.
- Common Ground Project, a Buddhist-Muslim interfaith initiative

== Other uses ==
- Common ground (communication technique)
- Common ground (linguistics) a set of propositions mutually agreed on by interlocutors
- CommonGround (software)
- "Common Ground" (Star Wars: The Bad Batch)

== See also ==
- Common Grounds, a comic book series
- On Common Ground, album by Kevin Crawford and Cillian Vallely
