= Better This World =

- Film poster
- Directed by: Kelly Duane; Katie Galloway
- Starring: Scott Crow; Brandon Darby; Matthew Vadum
- Cinematography: David Layton
- Edited by: Greg O'Toole
- Music by: Paul Brill
- Production companies: Loteria Films; Picturebox; Motto Pictures; Passion Pictures
- Distributed by: PBS
- Release date: April 23, 2011 (SFIFF)
- Running time: 82 minutes
- Country: United States
- Language: English

Better This World is a 2011 documentary film that was directed by Kelly Duane and Katie Galloway. It had its world premiere at the San Francisco International Film Festival on April 23, 2011, where it won two Golden Gate Awards for Best Documentary Feature and Bay Area Documentary Feature.

The documentary follows activists Bradley Crowder and David McKay as they plan to protest the 2008 Republican Convention. The film recounts their journey from boyhood friends growing up together in Midland, Texas, to the convention in St. Paul, Minnesota, and ends soon after their trials.

== Synopsis ==
Told mostly from the young men's point of view, the film highlights on their political past growing up in a conservative town while they held more liberal, anti-war beliefs. These beliefs led them down a path towards a well-known activist, Brandon Darby, who made a name for himself for his work with hurricane Katrina victims. Known as an aggressive and no-nonsense activist, Darby had credibility from his affiliation with the Common Ground Collective or Common Ground Relief which worked to secure aid for hurricane victims.

Darby, McKay, and Crowder, along with a few others, planned and executed a plan to protest the convention. Together they made shields to protect themselves from the police departments use of rubber bullets against protesters and headed off to the convention. Interviews with the FBI suggested that they were aware of these activities all along. They were intimately tracking these (and many other) protesters, and when the group reached St. Paul, they found it to be more like a police state than a city. As the story plays out, we learn exactly how the FBI became so knowledgeable: informants. And in this case, their informant was Brandon Darby.

After their homemade shields were stolen at the convention, the men, along with Darby, became increasingly paranoid and terrified. Crowder and McKay decided to make molotov cocktails to be used in property destruction. They changed their minds, but didn't dispose of the devices. Soon after, the men were arrested under terrorism charges and their faces were plastered all over the news media. But the question of exactly who is to blame is at the center of the film. The men trusted and emulated Darby, and according to them, Darby influenced every decision that was made. So the viewer has to ask if they were entrapped. And if they were indeed entrapped, does that mean the government who is trusted to seek out terrorists to ensure freedom is implicit in terrorist activities?

== Cast ==
- Scott Crow
- Brad Crowder
- Brandon Darby
- David McKay
- Matthew Vadum

== Reception ==
Critical reception for Better This World has been positive and the film holds a rating of 100% "fresh" on Rotten Tomatoes, based on 9 reviews.

=== Awards ===
- Jury Award for Best Documentary at the Dallas Video Festival (2011, won)
- Best Documentary at the Gotham Independent Film Awards (2011, won)
- Creative Recognition Award for Best Music at the International Documentary Association (2011 - Paul Brill)
- Golden Gate Award for Bay Area Documentary Feature at the San Francisco International Film Festival (2011, won)
- Golden Gate Award for Best Documentary Feature at the San Francisco International Film Festival (2011, won)
- Jury Prize for Best Documentary Feature at the Sarasota Film Festival (2011, won)
- Writers Guild of America Award for Best Documentary Screenplay (2011, won)
