= Robert Hillary King =

American activist (born 1942)

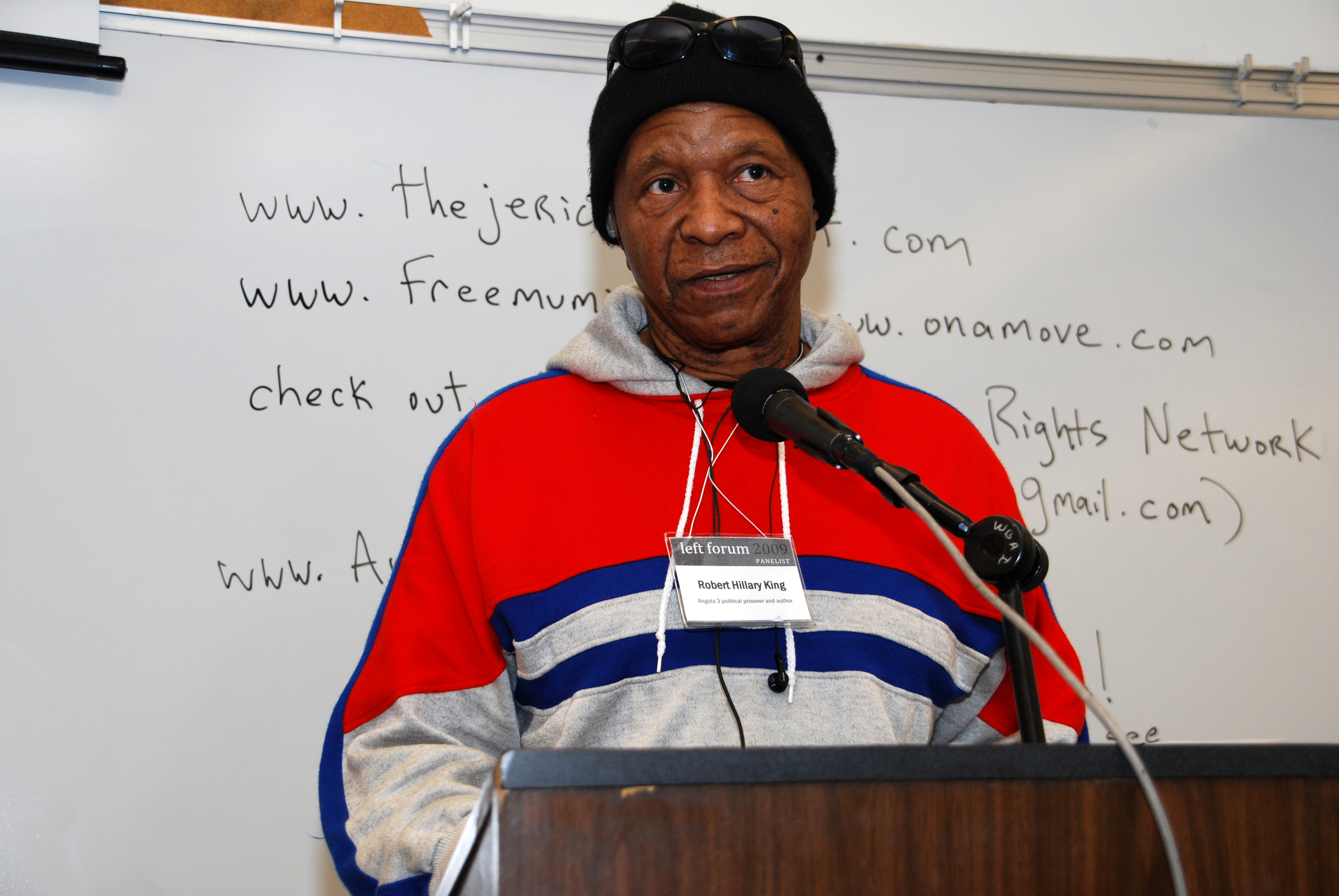
- King at the Left Forum, New York City, 2009
- Born: May 30, 1942 (age 84); Gonzales, Louisiana, U.S.
- Other names: Robert King Wilkerson; Speedy King
- Occupation: Activist
- Known for: Angola Three
- Children: 1

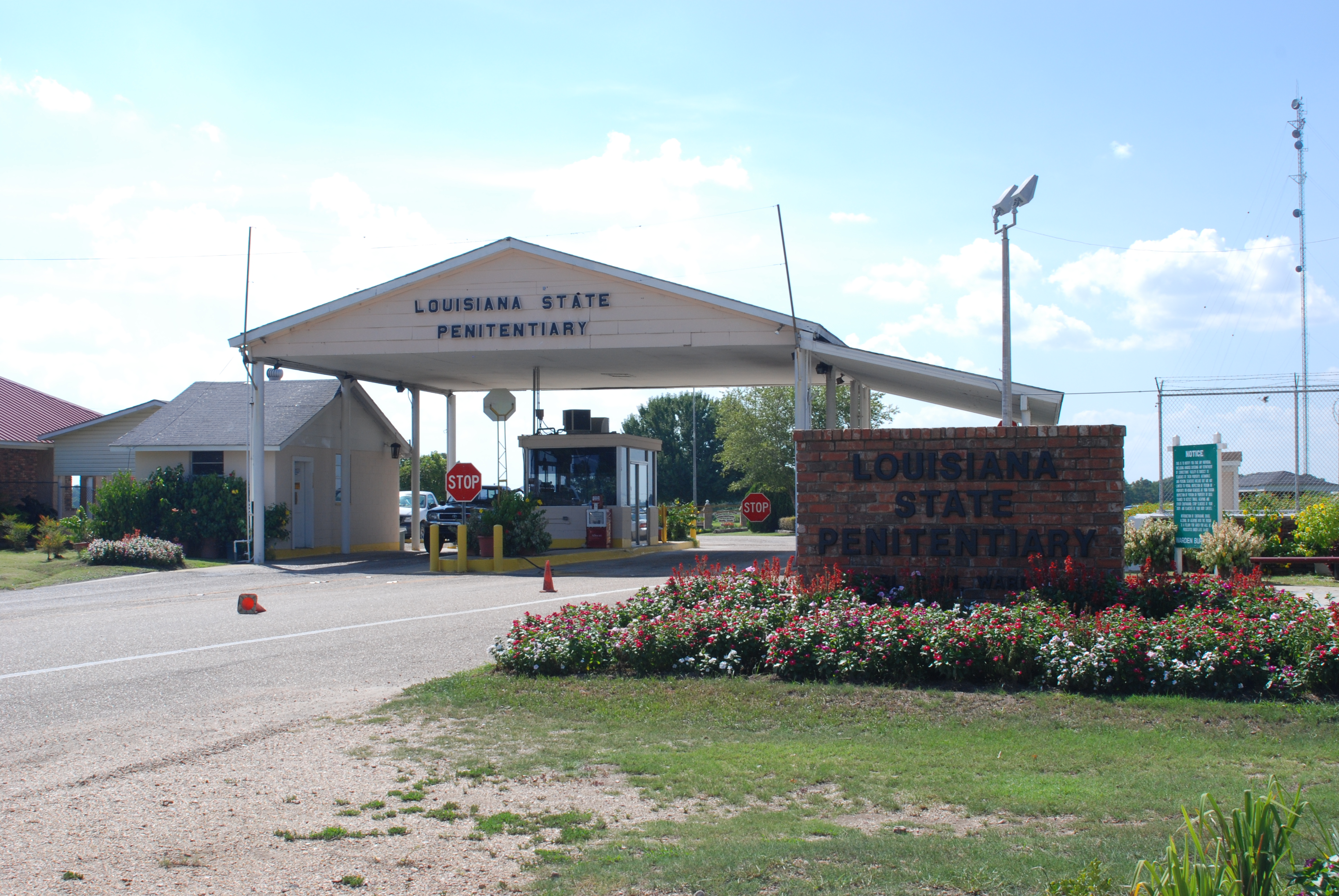
Louisiana State Penitentiary, where King has been confined.

Robert Hillary King (born May 30, 1942), formerly Robert King Wilkerson, is an American known as one of the Angola Three prisoners who were held at Louisiana State Penitentiary (also called "Angola") in solitary confinement for decades after being convicted in 1973 of prison murders.

Initially held at Angola after being convicted of armed robbery, King served a total of 32 years there, 29 of them in solitary. His conviction was overturned on appeal in 2001, and a new trial was ordered. The state indicted him again and he accepted a plea deal for lower charges, in exchange for time served, rather than go through another trial. He was released in 2001.

King has consistently maintained his innocence in the prison murder. He was among the co-founders of the Angola chapter of the Black Panther Party. With Albert Woodfox and Herman Wallace, also former Black Panthers, he is known as one of the Angola 3, men who were held for decades in solitary confinement at Angola. With the death of Woodfox in August 2022, King is the last surviving member of the Angola 3.

== Biography ==
=== Early life ===
King was born on 30 May 1942 in Gonzales, Louisiana to Hillary Wilkerson and Clara Mae King. He grew up in New Orleans. He had an older sister, Mary (born 1940), who died around the 1960s, and a younger sister, Ella Mae. They lived in a poor neighborhood in New Orleans, where he became involved in petty crime as a youth, and learned to fear police.

=== Criminal activity and charges ===
King has admitted to being involved in petty crime as a youth, but says that he was innocent of his first major conviction: for armed robbery. He was sentenced to 35 years and first held at Orleans Parish Prison, where he met Albert Woodfox. Woodfox had also been convicted for armed robbery, and had been given a 50-year sentence. After being held at the parish prison, King was sent to Angola Prison, which he entered at the age of 18.

Granted parole in 1965, at the age of 22, King returned to New Orleans. He married a woman named Clara and began a brief semi-pro boxing career under the nickname of "Speedy King". Several weeks prior to the birth of his son, King was one of two suspects arrested on charges of robbery. After being held in jail for more than 11 months, King's acquaintance, known as "Boogie", accepted a plea bargain and was released on time served.

Simultaneously, the District Attorney dropped the charges against King, but he was not released. His having been arrested in the company of a now admitted felon (Boogie, since his plea deal), was deemed a parole violation. King was returned to Angola prison, where he served 15 months, before being released on parole again in January 1969.

King was later arrested again on robbery charges and was convicted. His co-defendant on these charges testified that he had picked King out of a mug shot lineup only after being tortured by police into making a false statement. King appealed his conviction. While being held at Orleans Parish Prison, he escaped, but was re-captured weeks later.

Upon being returned to Orleans Parish Prison in 1971, King met some of the twelve Black Panther Party members who had been arrested after armed 1970 confrontations with police in September and November 1970. Law enforcement was trying to expel them from their headquarters near a housing project. They had established breakfast and education programs there. A bystander was killed by police, and the twelve Panthers were charged with attempted murder. They were acquitted by a jury. King became radicalized and worked with the Panthers; they organized and participated in non-violent hunger strikes at the prison in an effort to improve conditions.

In 1972, officials moved King from the parish prison to Angola to serve the remainder of his sentence. It was shortly after the stabbing death there of prison guard Brent Miller. King allied with the Black Panthers. Upon arrival at the prison, on the grounds that King "wanted to play lawyer for another inmate," he was immediately put into solitary confinement: first in the "dungeon," then the "Red Hat", and finally in the Closed Correction Cell (CCR) unit, where he was held until his 2001 release. In 1973, King was charged with murdering another prisoner, and was convicted. At the trial, he was bound and gagged. After he had maintained his innocence for years and appealed, his conviction was overturned in 2001.

The state re-indicted him for the murder and said they would retry King on these charges. He accepted a plea bargain of lesser charges and was released, as he had already served more time than the sentence at the lower charges of conspiracy to commit murder.

=== Later life ===
Since his release, Robert King has worked as a speaker on prison reform and the justice system. He has been featured in numerous print, media and film articles and interviews worldwide including: CNN, National Public Radio, NBC, BBC and ITN. He appeared in two documentaries about him and his fellow prisoners in long-term solitary: Angola 3: Black Panthers and the Last Slave Plantation and Land of the Free (2010). He also provided continuing support to Wallace and Woodfox in prison.

His autobiography, From the Bottom of the Heap: The Autobiography of a Black Panther (2008), was released by PM Press. He won a PASS Award for his book in 2009 from the National Council on Crime and Delinquency.

In prison, King started making pralines while in solitary confinement, gathering ingredients from other prisoners and guards. The story of his candymaking in prison has become the most requested story that the Kitchen Sisters have produced for NPR. He calls his pralines "freelines", with funds used to support his activism. He sells them from his website.

Following the destruction throughout the poorest areas of New Orleans in the wake of Hurricane Katrina in 2005, King pitched in with local activists to organize communities and provide aid. Local activist Malik Rahim, and Scott Crow and Brandon Darby, both from Texas, co-founded the Common Ground Collective to provide assistance and medical care to local residents left destitute after the storm.

King has spoken internationally against the use of solitary confinement and on behalf of Wallace and Woodfox while they were still imprisoned. He has spoken at college campuses and community centers across the US, and before the Parliaments in the Netherlands, South Africa and Portugal. On 1 December 2010, King was invited as the inaugural speaker at TEDxAlcatraz in San Francisco, delivering a talk entitled "Alone".

King is a supporter of Scottish football club Celtic F.C. and wore a Celtic shirt during his first ever television interview on CNN in June 2015. On a podcast in 2020, King explained why he became a Celtic fan:

"Everyone knows of Glasgow Celtic and the story of the club. They represent oppressed people like me and my brothers in the African/American community, they represent the poor Irish immigrants in the UK and the people in the poorest areas of Glasgow - the people with nothing and who face adversity you know? It is a constant source of inspiration that a mainstream sports club, so famous worldwide, was put there by the people for the people and still sticks to its founding principles and represents the people who have no other representation. The Celtic fans are known to stand up for what’s right and take no shit from the establishment! Even people who have never watched a soccer game in their life respect that club and what they stand for. I've never been to the UK but if I ever get the chance it (Celtic Park) would be the first place I would visit."

== Bibliography ==
- MSNBC
- NPR Hidden Kitchens series
- "Angola 3: 36 Years of Solitude" series, Mother Jones
- Angola 3, National Public Radio
- Alternet article on the Angola 3
- TEDxAlcatraz - Robert King - "Alone"
- "Black Panther Robert King". Interview by Thorne Dreyer, June 22, 2010, Rag Radio (58:01)

== Sources ==
- King, Robert Hillary (2012). From the Bottom of the Heap: The Autobiography of Black Panther Robert Hillary King. PM Press. ISBN 9781604865752.
