= Angola Three =

American prison inmates in solitary for decades

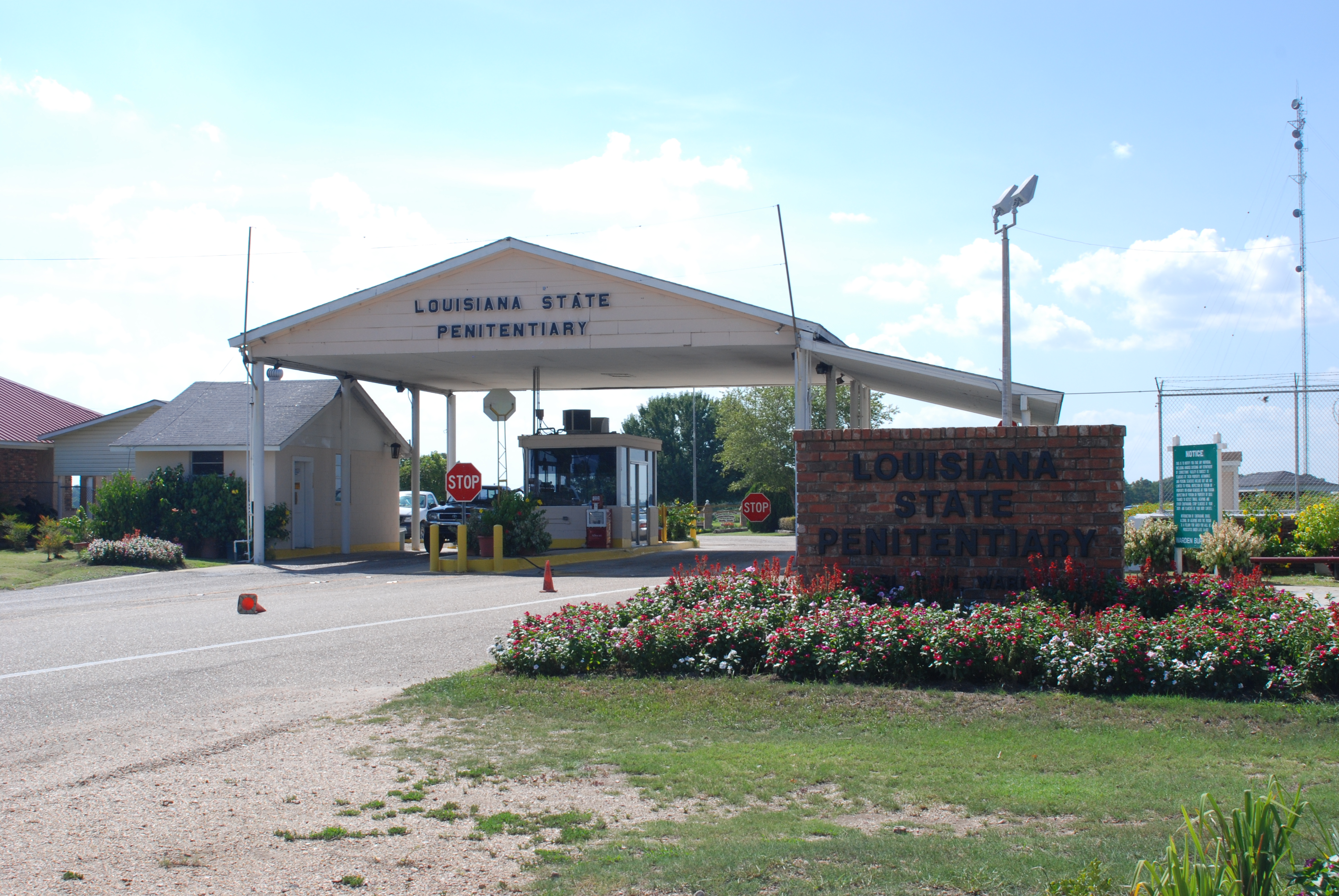
Louisiana State Penitentiary, the prison where the Angola Three were confined

The Angola Three are three African American former prison inmates (Robert Hillary King, Albert Woodfox, and Herman Wallace) who were held for decades in solitary confinement while imprisoned at Louisiana State Penitentiary (also known as Angola Prison). Woodfox and Wallace were indicted in April 1972 for the killing of a prison corrections officer; they were convicted in January 1974. They served more than 40 years each in solitary, the "longest period of solitary confinement in American prison history". Robert King was convicted of a separate prison murder in 1973 and spent 29 years in solitary confinement. Starting in the late 1990s, each case was assessed, and activists began to work to have the cases appealed and convictions overturned because of doubts raised about the original trials.

King's conviction was overturned on appeal and he was released in 2001 after taking a plea deal.

In July 2013, Amnesty International called for the release of 71-year-old Herman Wallace, who had been diagnosed with terminal liver cancer. He was released October 1, 2013, due to a judge overturning his original indictment due to the lack of female jurors. The state re-indicted him on October 3, 2013, but he died on October 4, 2013, before he could be re-arrested.

On November 20, 2014, Woodfox's conviction was overturned by the US Court of Appeals. In April 2015, his lawyer applied for an unconditional writ for his release. His unconditional release was decided on June 10, 2015. He was released on February 19, 2016, after the prosecution agreed to drop its push for a retrial and accept his plea of no contest to lesser charges of burglary and manslaughter. He said he would have liked the chance to prove his innocence, but chose the plea deal because of advanced age and health issues. Woodfox died from COVID-19 complications on August 4, 2022, at the age of 75.

== Initial imprisonment ==
Wallace and Woodfox were each sent to Angola Prison in 1971: Wallace was convicted of bank robbery, and Woodfox was convicted of armed robbery. Woodfox was sentenced to 50 years in prison.

Woodfox had escaped from the Orleans Parish courthouse during his sentencing hearing and fled to Harlem in New York City. There he was captured and jailed pending extradition to Louisiana. During this period, he met for the first time members of the Black Panther Party. They taught other inmates to read, led political discussions, and began his education. "For Woodfox, the teachings of the Panthers were revelatory, giving his life a direction and moral meaning he had never previously found." He joined the Black Panther Party and kept his intellectual connection after it dissolved. He began to learn about African-American history and the justice system. When returned to Louisiana, Woodfox was incarcerated at Angola.

At Angola, Wallace also became a member of the Black Panthers. He and Woodfox were among activists seeking to improve conditions at the notoriously cruel and violent prison. They helped organize education of other prisoners, and petitions and hunger strikes to protest segregation within the prison, and to end widespread rape and violence. They were targeted by the prison administration, who feared the politically active prisoners.

The day after prisoners injured a guard with a fire bomb in 1972, 23-year-old prison guard Brent Miller was found dead of multiple stab wounds. Woodfox and Wallace were indicted and convicted of his murder and sentenced to life in prison.

King had also been convicted of robbery, but he was not assigned to Angola until after Miller's murder. He said he was accused of acting as a "prison lawyer" for other inmates. He was convicted in 1973 in a separate prison murder. These three men were soon taken out of the general prison population and were held in solitary confinement.

== Rahim and Fleming investigation ==
In 1997, Malik Rahim, a community activist in New Orleans and a former Black Panther member, together with young lawyer Scott Fleming, who had worked as a prisoner advocate while a law student, learned that Wallace, King, and Woodfox were still incarcerated in solitary confinement. (Wallace had written to Fleming appealing for help in his case.) The two men initiated an investigation of the case, challenging the conclusions of the original investigations at Angola about the murder of guard Miller, and also raising questions about the conduct of the prisoners' original trials in 1972. Anita Roddick, founder of The Body Shop and known for her humanitarian activism, learned about the case from Fleming and helped raise international awareness about the Angola Three.

== Appeals and transfers ==
On appeal, Woodfox's 1974 conviction for the murder of Miller was overturned in 1993, on the constitutional grounds of inadequate counsel at the first trial. The state quickly indicted Woodfox again that year, the result of a grand jury that was headed by a white foreman appointed by the court. In 1998 Woodfox was convicted a second time for the prison murder. His defense mounted another appeal.

King's 1973 conviction, on charges unrelated to Miller's murder, was overturned in 2001 on appeal. The court ordered a new trial. While the state had the option to dismiss the charges, it reindicted King and said it would retry him. Before going to trial, the prosecutor offered him a plea deal, with the sentences for the lower charges to be offset by the time he had already served. King took the plea in order to gain release after 29 years in solitary confinement, but he said that he was innocent of the charges. He was released in 2001, the first of the Angola 3 to gain freedom.

In 2000, the Angola Three filed a civil suit against the Louisiana Department of Corrections "challenging the inhumane and increasingly pervasive practice of long-term solitary confinement". They seek damages against the state Department of Corrections because of the adverse effects of extended time in solitary confinement. As of 2019, their case is still pending.

While the men's civil suit and appeals of their cases were pending, in March 2008 Woodfox and Wallace were moved to a maximum-security dormitory at Angola. They had each been held for 36 years in solitary confinement. State Representative Cedric Richmond (D-New Orleans) was granted permission to visit them, which authorities rarely granted. He told an NPR reporter that he believed that they had been moved from solitary because of increasing political pressure about the case, as well as the men's civil suit against the state regarding solitary confinement.

Woodfox had two appeal hearings in federal district court (one in November 2008 and one in May 2010), which resulted in his second conviction being overturned and his being granted full habeas corpus. The rulings by the federal district court were overturned by the federal Fifth Circuit Court of Appeals.

Immediately after Woodfox's first appeal hearing in November 2008, both men were moved out of the maximum-security dormitory, separated, and returned to solitary confinement. In March 2009 Wallace, along with a group of 15 inmates from Angola, was moved to Elayn Hunt Correctional Center and placed in a newly created closed-cell isolation tier. The state argued that this was not solitary confinement. In November 2010, Woodfox was moved from Angola to David Wade Correctional Center, which was a much greater travelling distance for his lawyers and supporters.

Both Wallace and Woodfox, who had served past their original sentences for armed robbery, have allegedly suffered from a range of different medical issues—some due in part to their reported conditions of confinement and their enforced sedentary lifestyle. Prison officials had long maintained that the reason for keeping Wallace and Woodfox in solitary confinement was out of concern that they would instigate a prison uprising because of their belonging to the Black Panthers.

In July 2013, Wallace was diagnosed with advanced liver cancer. He had earlier been thought to have a stomach condition. Wallace's defense team had filed a writ of habeas corpus, saying that he had not received a fair trial and was thus being held illegally by the state. In October 2013, federal district judge Brian A. Jackson ruled that Wallace had not received a fair trial because no women were included on his jury. Judge Jackson vacated the original grand jury indictment and ordered Wallace's immediate release. The original indictment was unconstitutional. The state announced its intention to re-indict Wallace for Miller's murder, but he died on October 4, 2013, a few days after being released from jail.

In March 2013, a federal District Court judge in New Orleans overturned Woodfox's second (1998) conviction for the prison murder, ruling that it was based on racially discriminatory grounds because a white foreman had been appointed to the grand jury, and that this was part of a pattern of discriminatory practice found in the state. Louisiana Attorney General James Caldwell promised to appeal the District Court's decision, saying, "We feel confident that we will again prevail at the Fifth Circuit Court of Appeals. However, if we do not, we are fully prepared and willing to retry this murderer again."

On November 20, 2014, a three-person panel of Fifth Circuit judges unanimously upheld the lower court's opinion that Woodfox's conviction had been secured through racially discriminatory means. The panel found that the selection of a white grand-jury foreperson in the 1993 indictment hearing prior to trial formed part of a discriminatory pattern in that area of Louisiana. Concluding that this action amounted to a violation of the US Constitution, the judges struck down Woodfox's conviction.

The state of Louisiana refused to release Woodfox, pending their decision as to whether to pursue a new trial against him. The prison also refused to move him out of solitary confinement. On February 12, 2015, the state indicted Woodfox for a third time for the 1972 murder of Brent Miller, the prison guard.

On June 8, 2015, U.S. District Judge James Brady ordered the release of Woodfox, after having overturned his second conviction for the killing of the guard Miller. His order barred a third trial from taking place, as he noted that most of the witnesses had died and he believed that it was unlikely that Woodfox could gain a fair trial. He also noted "evidence suggesting Mr. Woodfox's innocence".

Four days later, the majority of a three-judge panel of the US Fifth Circuit Court of Appeals reversed Brady's decision. It directed that the state could hold Woodfox in prison until the matter was resolved, and that it could mount a third trial. "The dissenting judge, James L. Dennis, agreed with Judge Brady that the state had failed to remedy the problem of racial discrimination [in the second trial]. Judge Dennis noted that more than a dozen witnesses, including the state's only purported eyewitness to the murder and two alibi witnesses for Mr. Woodfox, were no longer alive."

The state announced that it would try Woodfox for murder a third time but offered him a plea deal after negotiation with his defense. Woodfox pleaded "no contest" (nolo contendere) to lesser charges of manslaughter and aggravated burglary. Together with his time for armed robbery, he had already served 45 years, the total of the sentences for those crimes. He was released based on time served, on February 19, 2016, his 69th birthday. Woodfox's civil suit filed in 2000, with plaintiffs King and Wallace, is still pending against the Louisiana Department of Corrections over the practice of extended solitary confinement.

== Releases ==
=== Robert King ===
King was released in 2001, following 29 years in solitary confinement. His first conviction was overturned on appeal, and he pleaded guilty to a lesser conspiracy to commit murder charge.

=== Herman Wallace ===
(October 13, 1941 – October 4, 2013) In July 2013, Amnesty International called for Herman Wallace's release on humanitarian grounds, saying, "Wallace is 71 years old and has advanced liver cancer. After decades of cruel conditions and a conviction that continues to be challenged by the courts, he should be released immediately to his family so that he can be cared for humanely during his last months." He had been transferred to the hospital unit in his prison. On October 1, 2013, Wallace was granted immediate release by U.S. District Chief Judge Brian A. Jackson of Baton Rouge, Louisiana, ending Wallace's forty-year incarceration in solitary confinement. The court had overturned Wallace's conviction in the murder of Miller, based on the unconstitutional exclusion of women from his jury, in violation of the 14th Amendment. Jackson ordered a new trial. The state chose to prosecute Wallace again for the murder of Miller although he was dying of liver cancer.

Wallace was taken to the house of a close friend in New Orleans. The state appealed the judge's orders, seeking to keep Wallace in prison. When East Baton Rouge District Attorney Hillar Moore appealed Judge Jackson's order, Jackson responded with a threat of charging him with contempt of court.

Jackie Sumell, a Wallace supporter, visited him at the Louisiana State University Medical Center in New Orleans after his release. She said, "This is a tremendous victory and a miracle that Herman Wallace will die a free man." She continued, "He's had 42 years of maintaining his innocence in solitary confinement, and if his last few breaths are as a free man, we've won."

On October 3, 2013, a West Feliciana Parish grand jury indicted Wallace again for the 1972 murder of Miller, the corrections officer. Herman Wallace died on October 4, 2013, three days after being released from prison.

=== Albert Woodfox ===
(February 19, 1947 – August 4, 2022) Amnesty International called for the release of Woodfox after Wallace's release. He had been held in solitary confinement since 1972. After more court challenges, Woodfox was finally released from prison on February 19, 2016, after being imprisoned for 45 years, 43 of them in solitary confinement. At the time, he spoke to a reporter from The New York Times and said, "When I began to understand who I was, I considered myself free." He was referring to learning via the Black Panthers and reading while in prison about his history as an African American and racial inequities in the US.

After his release, Woodfox wrote a memoir, Solitary: Unbroken by Four Decades in Solitary Confinement. My Story of Transformation and Hope (2019), about his early life and four decades in prison. Dwight Garner of The New York Times said that it was "uncommonly powerful". In 2020, the book won the Hurston/Wright Legacy Award for Nonfiction and the Stowe Prize. It was also a finalist for the 2020 Pulitzer Prize for General Nonfiction and a 2019 National Book Award for Nonfiction.

Woodfox died from complications of COVID-19 in New Orleans, Louisiana, on August 4, 2022, at the age of 75.

== Opposition to release ==
Miller's family continued to oppose Woodfox's release, believing that he was guilty. His father had worked in the prison, and a brother was a prison guard at the same time as Brent Miller. Another brother had earlier served as a prison guard. They were not changed in their opinions by the wavering of witnesses and lack of physical evidence in the case. However, Miller's widow, Teenie Verret, came to doubt Wallace and Woodfox's guilt. "If they did not do this," she says, "and I believe that they didn't, they have been living a nightmare."

State officials continued to strongly oppose the inmates' release. Louisiana's Attorney General, James Caldwell, said in 2013 that he opposed releasing the two men "with every fiber of my being". He said that they had never been held in solitary confinement but were in "protective cell units known as CCR [Closed Cell Restricted]".

Burl Cain, the former warden of Angola, said repeatedly in 2008 and 2009 that Woodfox and Wallace had to be held in CCR because they subscribed to "Black Pantherism".

== Popular interest and representation in other media ==
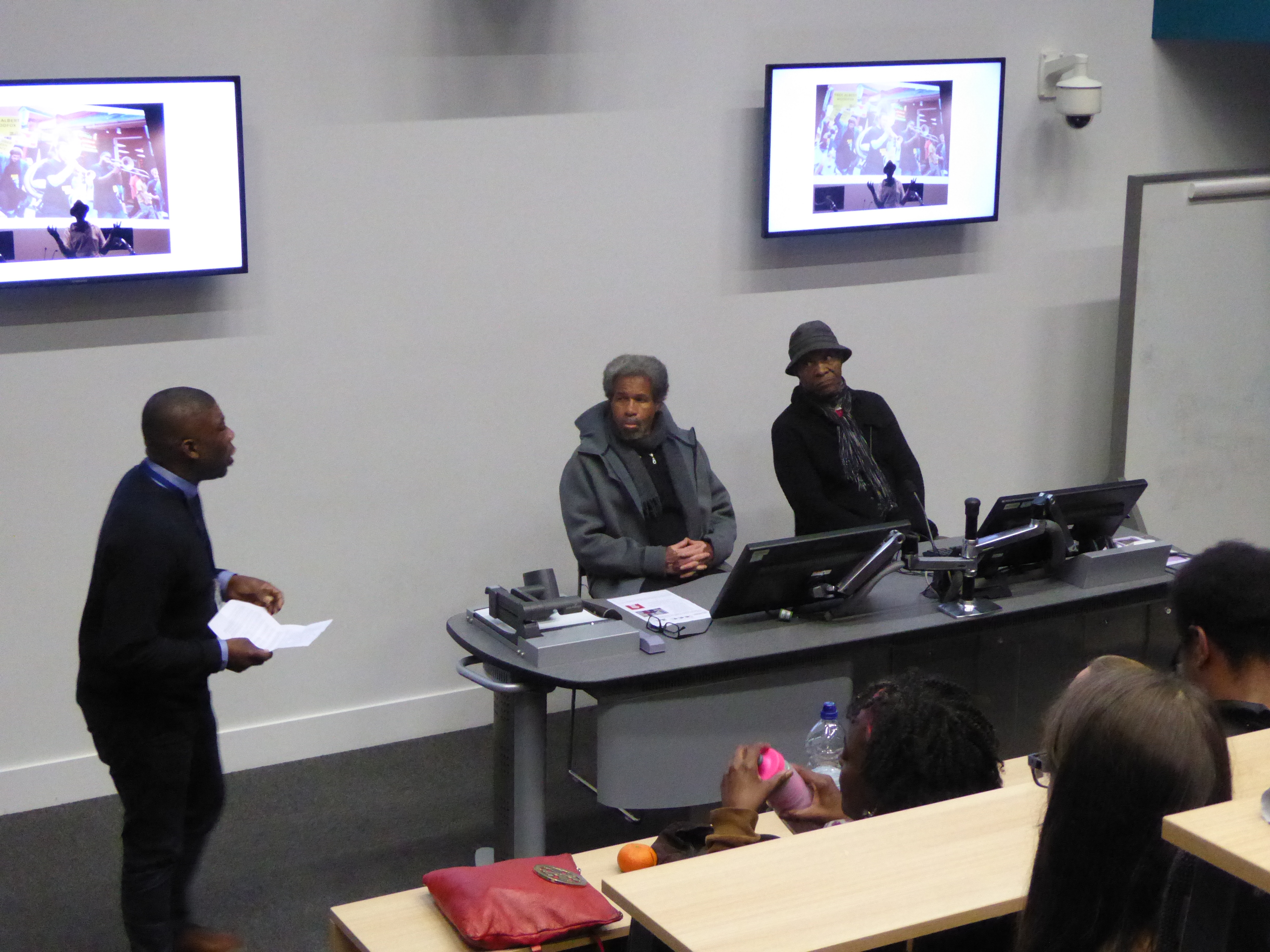
Albert Woodfox and Robert King at an Angola Three event at Manchester Metropolitan University, November 2016.

These cases received increased national and international interest following publicity related to King's release in 2001. Supporters mounted new challenges by appeals in court. Since his release, King has worked to build international recognition for the Angola Three. He spoke before the parliaments of the Netherlands, France, Portugal, Indonesia, Brazil and United Kingdom about the case, and about political prisoners in the United States. King was received as a guest and dignitary by the African National Congress in South Africa, and spoke with Desmond Tutu. Amnesty International added Wallace and Woodfox to their watch list of "political prisoners"/"prisoners of conscience".

NPR was the first to examine the case in depth in 2008 with a 3-part series by Laura Sullivan which unearthed new witnesses and won a Peabody Award. The Angola Three were the subject of two documentaries: Angola 3: Black Panthers and the Last Slave Plantation (2006), produced by Scott Crow and Ann Harkness; and In the Land of the Free (2010), directed by Vadim Jean and narrated by Samuel L. Jackson. The film features Robert King, telephone interviews with Woodfox and Wallace, and interviews with attorneys and others involved with the cases. These include the widow of the late guard Brent Miller, who believes the three men are innocent of her husband's murder.

The men were also the subject of a music video produced by Dave Stewart of the Eurythmics in protest of the incarceration of the Angola 3. It features Saul Williams, Nadirah X, Asdru Sierra, Dana Glover, Tina Schlieske, Derrick Ashong and Stewart. The song "The Rise of the Black Messiah" (2015), written by Amy Ray and performed by Indigo Girls, was inspired by the Angola 3.

Herman Wallace was the subject of an ongoing socio-political art project entitled The House That Herman Built. Artist Jackie Sumell asked Wallace what his dream home would be like, and expressed his response in various media. Angad Singh Bhalla made a feature-length documentary, Herman's House (2012), about Sumell's project. It was nationally broadcast on PBS's POV program, on July 8, 2013. The film was followed by an interactive documentary, The Deeper They Bury Me: A Call from Herman Wallace (2015).

On June 4, 2019, Mahershala Ali was set to executive produce and portray Woodfox in the feature film adaptation of “Unbroken by Four Decades In Solitary Confinement, My Story of Transformation and Hope” for Searchlight Pictures.
