= Bibliography of Justin Trudeau =

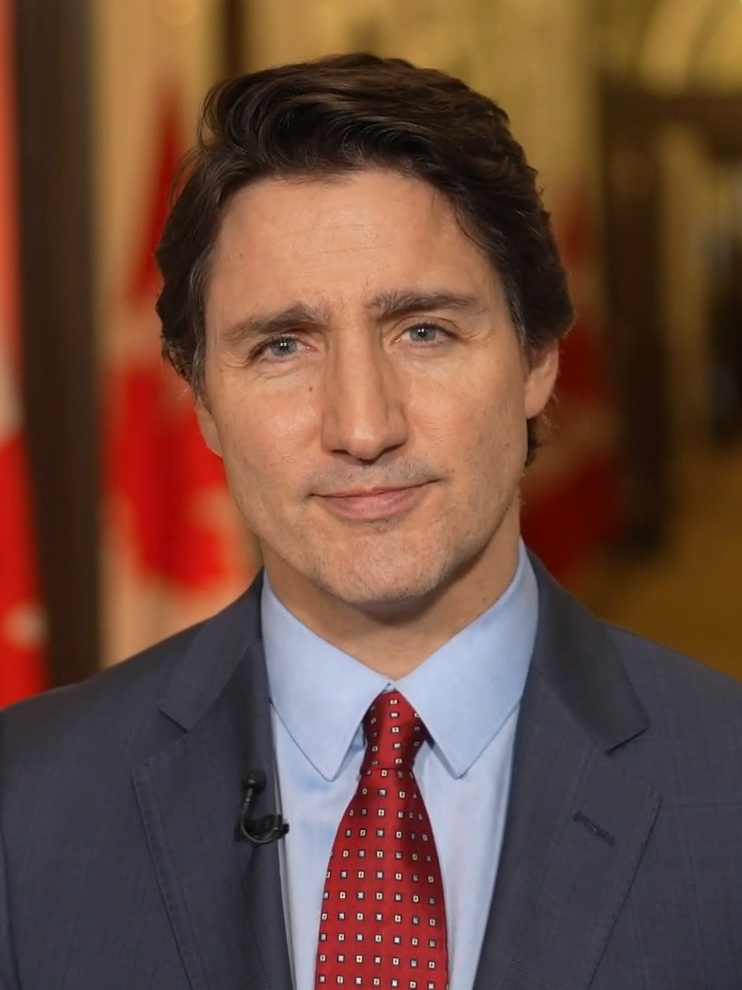
Trudeau in 2023

Justin Trudeau is a Canadian politician who served as the 23rd prime minister of Canada from 2015 to 2025. His first and only published book, Common Ground, was written while he was serving as leader of the Liberal Party of Canada, and released in 2014. Common Ground is a memoir detailing Trudeau's life experiences from childhood up until his leadership of the Liberal Party.

Trudeau has been the subject of a large volume of literature. This bibliography compiles written and published works discussing Trudeau, limited to non-fiction books about Trudeau and his political career, from notable authors and publishers. Tertiary sources, satire, and self-published literature are excluded.

== Books by Trudeau ==
List of written and published works by Justin Trudeau
Title	Year	Publisher	ISBN / OCLC	Notes
Common Ground	2014	HarperCollins	ISBN 978-1-4434-3337-2 OCLC 893647393	

== Books about Trudeau ==
List of written and published works about Justin Trudeau
Author	Title	Year	Publisher	Identifiers	Notes
Huguette Young	Justin Trudeau: The Natural Heir	2016	Dundurn Press	ISBN 978-1-4597-3573-6; OCLC 957131811	
Norman Hilmer, Philippe Lagassé (eds.)	Justin Trudeau and Canadian Foreign Policy	2018	Springer International Publishing	ISBN 978-3-3197-3859-8; OCLC 1030967041	
Jocelyn Coulon	Un selfie avec Justin Trudeau: Regard critique sur la diplomatie du premier ministre (in French)	2018	Québec Amérique	ISBN 978-2-7644-3608-0; OCLC 1037028812	
John Ivison	Trudeau: The Education of a Prime Minister	2019	Signal Books	ISBN 978-0-7710-4895-1; OCLC 1090798612	
Martin Lukacs	The Trudeau Formula: Seduction and Betrayal in an Age of Discontent	2019	Black Rose Books	ISBN 978-1-5516-4748-7; OCLC 1105200463	
Aaron Wherry	Promise and Peril: Justin Trudeau in Power	2019	HarperCollins	ISBN 978-1-4434-5827-6; OCLC 1113927187	
Jocelyn Coulon	Canada is Not Back: How Justin Trudeau is in Over His Head on Foreign Policy	2019	Formac Lorimer Books	ISBN 978-1-4594-1334-4; OCLC 1084975102	
Lisa Birch, Francois Petry (eds.)	Assessing Justin Trudeau's Liberal Government	2019	Presses de l'Université Laval	ISBN 978-2-7637-4444-5; OCLC 1134827776	
Alan Hustak	Magnetic North: The Unauthorised Biography of Justin Trudeau, Canada's Selfie PM	2019	Eyewear Publishing	ISBN 978-1-9124-7796-8; OCLC 984058253	
Yves Engler	House of Mirrors: Justin Trudeau's Foreign Policy	2020	Black Rose Books	ISBN 978-1-5516-4749-4; OCLC 1138019449	
Stephen Maher	The Prince: The Turbulent Reign of Justin Trudeau	2024	Simon & Schuster	ISBN 978-1-6680-2449-2; OCLC 1410390618	(Note: Interview with Stephen Maher on The Morning Show, Global Toronto. 19 June 2024. (5:21min) – via YouTube) (Note: Interview with Stephen Maher on Canada Tonight, CBC News. 22 May 2024. (9:19min) – via YouTube)
Paul Wells	Justin Trudeau on the Ropes: Governing in Troubled Times	2024	Sutherland House Books	ISBN 978-1-9908-2382-4; OCLC 1433223851	(Note: Interview with Paul Wells on CPAC. 7 May 2024. (10:25min) – via YouTube)
Katherine Scott, Laura Macdonald, and Stuart Trew	The Trudeau Record: Promise v. Performance	2024	Formac Lorimer Books	ISBN 978-1-4594-1825-7; OCLC 1439041202	

== See also ==
- List of books about prime ministers of Canada
- Bibliography of Canada
