= Malik Rahim =

American housing activist and cofounder of the Common Ground Project

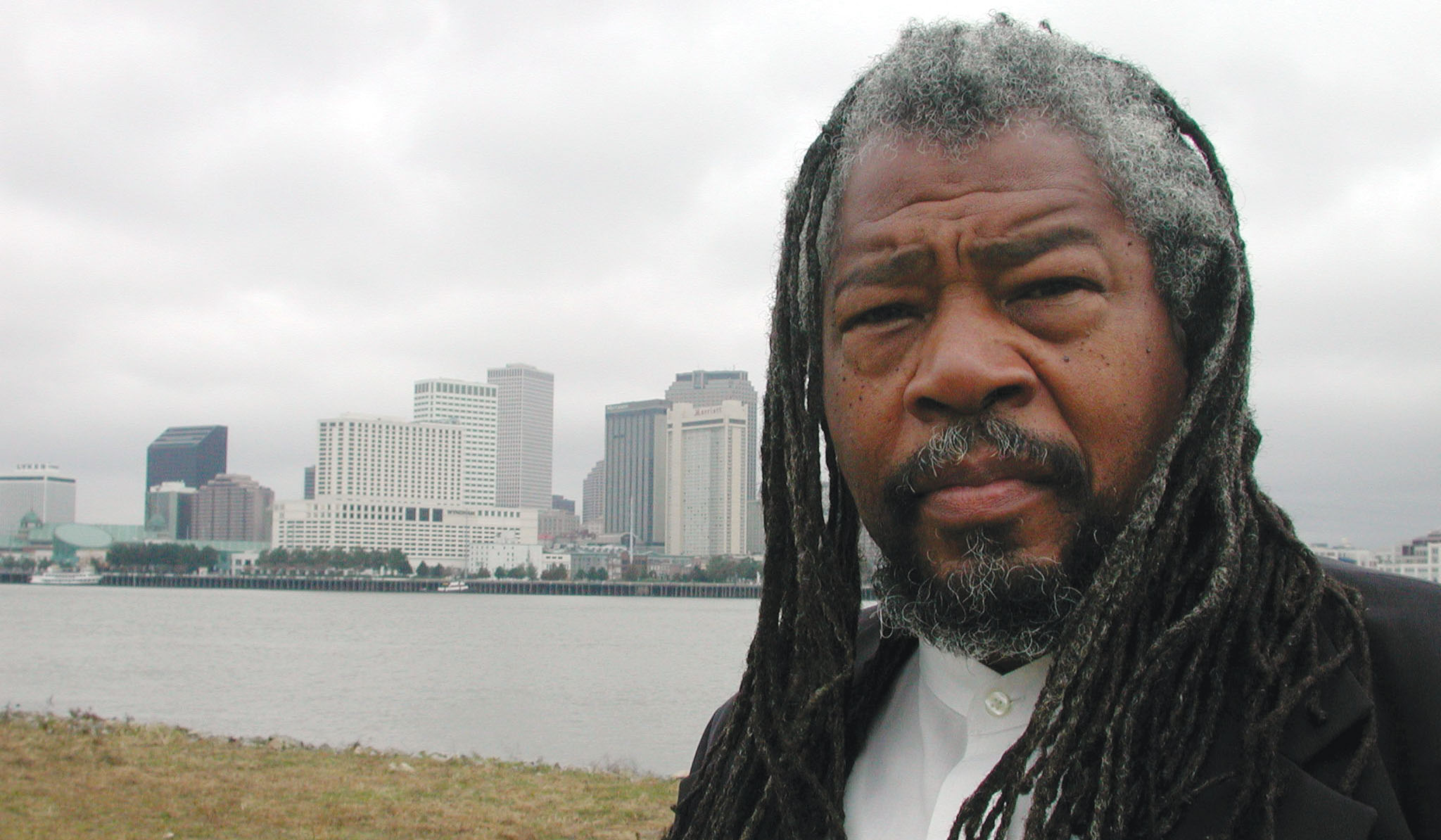
- Malik Rahim in 2001
- Born: Donald Guyton; December 17, 1947 (age 78); Algiers, Louisiana, U.S.
- Occupation: Community organizer

Malik Rahim (born Donald Guyton) is an American housing and prison activist based since the late 1990s in the New Orleans area of Louisiana, where he grew up. In 2005 Rahim gained national publicity as a community organizer in New Orleans in 2005 to combat the widespread destruction in the aftermath of Hurricane Katrina; there he co-founded the Common Ground Collective.

A veteran and former Black Panther in New Orleans, in 1970 Rahim moved out to California, working on issues of affordable housing in San Francisco. After returning to New Orleans, Rahim founded the Algiers Development Center and Invest Transitional Housing, which helped house more than 1,000 ex-offenders after prison. He also was a founding member of Pilgrimage for Life, advocating an end to the death penalty in the state.

Rahim ran for New Orleans City Council in 2002, representing the Green Party, but was unsuccessful. In 2008, he was one of four candidates to run for Louisiana's 2nd congressional district seat of the U.S. House of Representatives. He was a Green Party candidate; Republican candidate Joseph Cao won the election.

== Early life and education ==
Born in 1947 December 17th as Donald Guyton in Algiers, Louisiana, south of the Mississippi River from New Orleans, he was raised in this industrial city. He attended Landry High School, but left prior to graduation to join the United States Navy. He served in the Vietnam War.

== Activism in New Orleans ==
In May 1970, having completed his service, Guyton returned to New Orleans. He joined in trying to organize a chapter of the Black Panther Party in Louisiana. They first set up the "National Committee to Combat Fascism," which developed as the state chapter of the Black Panthers. The group made their base at a house on Saint Thomas Street. Members conducted political activities, as well as providing free breakfast, tutoring, and anti-crime programs to community residents, especially children. When the owner learned about their affiliations, the group was evicted. During this period, Guyton took the name Malik Rahim, which he has kept.

The future Panthers moved into a house on Piety Street, near the Desire housing project. Served with an eviction notice in September 1970, they refused to move out. The house was raided by police on September 14, 1970; they were armed with a machine gun and what was called a war wagon. They used the gun against the house, tearing it up, but none of the Black Panthers was wounded or killed. Rahim was among the group that walked out and were arrested by police. They were held on death row at Angola prison pending charges. More Panthers were arrested after the second shootout in November, too many to be held on death row, and some were put in the dungeon of the prison until the trial.

Several remaining Panthers moved into another house in the Desire project. Police conducted another raid on November 19, as the owner wanted to evict the group. After another shootout and brief standoff, thousands of residents of the project prevented the police from entering. A bystander was killed by police in the shootout. On November 26, police succeeded in raiding the house and arresting the Panthers present by disguising some officers as priests who had participated in the breakfast program.

Rahim, by then the chapter's defense minister, was among the twelve Panthers charged with attempted murder by New Orleans for the two shootouts. He and the other eleven defendants were acquitted by a jury.

== California and community activism (1970-2002) ==
After being released, Rahim moved out to Los Angeles, California, where he earned a G.E.D. and attended one semester of college. But he became involved in crime. He was convicted of armed robbery and served a five-year prison sentence in Los Angeles, which ended in the early 1980s. By his account, this resulted in his return to political activism. Initially he focused on rights for prisoners, and programs to assist and house them on their release. He gradually became involved in more general housing issues.

In the next two decades, Rahim helped to found and operate a number of political and advocacy organizations. In San Francisco, he led the Bernal Dwellings Tenants' Association from 1995 to 1997. He opposed demolition of the structure as part of the HOPE VI plan, and worked for affordable housing. In 1996 he was a founding member of "Housing is a Human Right," a citywide non-profit advocacy organization for affordable housing.

In 1998, Rahim traveled with Kathy Kelly And former US Attorney General Ramsey Clark along with others to Iraq in direct opposition to The embargo and sanctions.

== Return to New Orleans ==
Rahim returned to Louisiana in the late 1990s, where he co-founded and ran the "Algiers Development Center and Invest Transitional Housing." This program for ex-offenders has housed more than one thousand former inmates. He was a founding member of the Louisiana anti-death penalty group "Pilgrimage for Life," along with Sister Helen Prejean.

In 1998 Rahim was a co-founder of the "National Coalition to Free the Angola 3," an organization working for the release of three Black Panthers who had been convicted of prison murders and held for more than two decades at Angola Prison in solitary confinement. The three have said they are innocent and that the charges were politically motivated. Robert Hillary King's conviction was overturned in 2001, and he was released after taking a plea deal. Herman Wallace's conviction was overturned and he was released in 2013 on humanitarian grounds, dying three days later of liver cancer, with the state prepared to try him again. Albert Woodfox had two convictions for the prison murder each overturned, on grounds of inadequate counsel, prosecutor misconduct and racial discrimination. Both rulings were overturned by a panel of the Fifth Circuit Appeals Court, the second in 2016. While Woodfox said he would like to prove his innocence, he said “concerns about my health and my age have caused me to resolve this case now and obtain my release with this no-contest plea to lesser charges.” He accepted the plea deal and was released in February 2016.

== Green Party, Hurricane Katrina, and Common Ground (2002-present) ==
In 2002, Rahim became involved in electoral politics for the first time, running for the New Orleans City Council on the Green Party of Louisiana ticket; he received 3,654 votes (2%). Rahim ran on a platform of a "living wage," improved conditions at public housing, and reform of youth programs and the juvenile justice system.

Ignoring evacuation orders, Rahim remained in the city of New Orleans through Hurricane Katrina in 2005. In the chaotic days after the hurricane, he wrote an article about conditions in the city, entitled "This Is Criminal". He set up an ad hoc relief distribution center at his late mother's house in the aftermath. The house is recognized as an International Site of Conscience.

Later he cofounded the Common Ground Collective with two organizers from Austin, Texas, Brandon Darby and scott crow. They distributed aid locally and ran a community health clinic, with the help of volunteers from across the United States. In the next few months, Rahim traveled across the country to report on efforts in New Orleans and encourage volunteers to travel to the city to work with his group for the community.

In 2006, Rahim announced plans to run for mayor of New Orleans, but did not complete the process to appear on the ballot. In July 2008, Rahim decided to run again for national office. He filed to run for Louisiana's 2nd congressional district seat of the U.S. House of Representatives as a Green Party candidate. He ran against Democratic incumbent William J. Jefferson, Republican candidate Joseph Cao, and Libertarian Party candidate Gregory Kahn. Cao won; Rahim finished third in the four candidate field, receiving 2.8% of the vote.

In 2009, Rahim's former associate, Brandon Darby, was revealed to have been an FBI informant when he worked with the Common Ground Collective in New Orleans.

In 2016, muralist Brandan "BMike" Odums helped create a community Mural of Malik Rahim and neighborhood resident Enid Songy

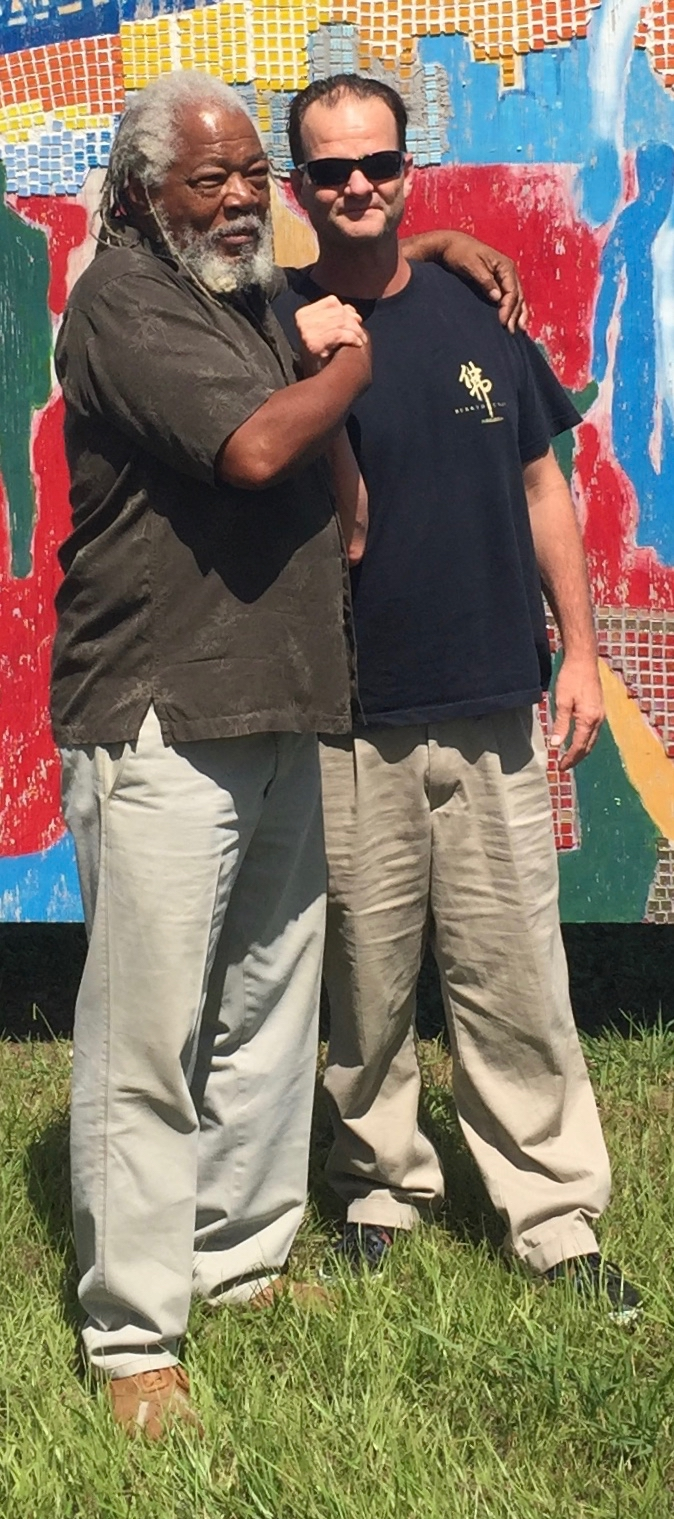
Rahim and Dennis Kyne in Algiers Point New Orleans, 2019

== Representation in other media ==
Rahim was featured with Scott Crow, Desert storm Veteran Dennis Kyne and activist's Jimmy Dunson and Suncere Ali Shakur in the documentary Welcome to New Orleans (2006), directed by Rasmus Holm, about their efforts in community building in the city.

== Honors and awards ==
- In 2006, Rahim was awarded the 'Community Builder Award' by Global Exchange, an international human rights organization based in San Francisco.
- In 2008, Rahim was honored as the recipient of the Thomas Merton Award, for his commitment to humanity.
- In 2019, Rahim was given the Living Legend Award from Southern University, and recognized by the New Orleans City Council for assisting more than 500,000 people following Katrina.
