= Jackie Sumell =

American artist

- Born: June 11, 1973 (age 53); Brooklyn, New York, U.S.
- Education: College of Charleston, B.S. Stanford University, M.F.A.
- Occupations: Artist, author, activist

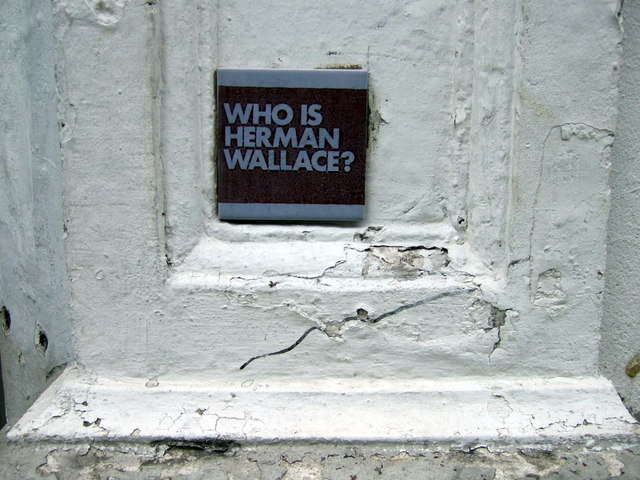
2007 awareness campaign in collaboration with fellow activist Carrie Reichardt, UK

Jackie Sumell (born 1973) is an American multidisciplinary artist and activist whose work interrogates the abuses of the American criminal justice system. She is best known for her collaborative project with the late Herman Wallace, one of the former Angola 3 prisoners, entitled The House That Herman Built. This project is the subject of a critically acclaimed documentary film aired on PBS entitled Herman's House.

Sumell is a 2007 Akademie Schloss Solitude Fellow, a 2013 Open Society Soros Justice Fellow, a 2015 Nathan Cummings Foundation Recipient, a 2015 Eyebeam Project Fellow and a 2016 Robert Rauchenberg Artist as Activist Fellow.

== Early life ==
Sumell was born in Brooklyn and grew up on Long Island, New York. She was the first girl to play competitive tackle football in an all-boys league in the New York. She graduated from Connetquot High School and went on to the College of Charleston, where she played Division I soccer. During her undergrad, Sumell spent a year abroad studying at Monash University in Melbourne, Australia (1995).

== Education ==
Sumell received a Bachelor of Science from the College of Charleston in 1996. She received a Post-Baccalaureate degree from San Francisco Art Institute (2001), and a Master of Fine Arts in New Practices from Stanford University in 2004.

== Early work ==
While working on her M.F.A. at Stanford, Sumell challenged President George Bush's election and his policies toward women through a project entitled No Bush. Sumell asked women to shave their pubic hair and send it to her in a plastic bag, which she exhibited on a clothesline at the National Mall to draw attention to the erosion of pro-choice laws under the Bush administration. While in residency at the Temple Bar Gallery in Dublin, Ireland, Sumell explored locality, difference and identity in a project called A=AGHT. It connected youth from New Orleans to youth from Dublin through their joint creation of an imaginary city.

== The House That Herman Built ==
In 2001, Sumell attended a lecture in San Francisco where she met Robert King, the first of the Angola 3 to be released from prison and decades of solitary confinement at Angola Prison. She was moved by King's composure despite his having spent 29 years in solitary confinement. She asked him how she could become more involved with the Angola 3 movement, which was advocating release of the other two men who continued to be held in solitary. King said that she should begin by writing his comrades, Albert Woodfox and Herman Wallace. Wallace had been imprisoned since 1972 when he was placed in solitary confinement after being accused of the murder of a prison guard at the Louisiana State Penitentiary at Angola. (both he and Woodfox were convicted of this murder.) After 2 years of correspondence with Wallace, while Sumell was still at Stanford, she asked him to describe his dream home. She had intended to propose such a project to a professor as the basis for an assignment. Wallace's answer would serve as the basis for her ongoing collaborative project with him, known as The House That Herman Built. A documentary film, Herman's House, was made of their process together, albeit at a distance.

What became an 11-year collaboration between Sumell and Wallace tours as an art exhibition. It is used to engage the viewing audience in a dialogue about the use of long-term solitary confinement in America's prisons. Using imaginative space to build the house that Wallace envisions, Sumell connects the human imagination to the realities of the prison system. In addition to mounting the exhibit, Sumell is endeavoring to construct The House That Herman Built as a full-size structure in Wallace's hometown of New Orleans. Wallace intends for the house to be used as a community space committed to youth outreach and education. As it was originally conceived, The House That Herman Built is designed to be an open space that encourages the exchange of ideas, art and activism. It will be open for anyone to visit and learn about the practice of solitary confinement in American prisons.

The exhibition, which renders to scale the model of Herman's house, has been shown in more than a dozen countries. It has been shown at The American Visionary Art Museum in Baltimore, The Brooklyn Library Main Branch, The Royal College of Art in London, Artist's Space in New York City, The Akademie Schloss-Solitude in Stuttgart, Germany; The St Etienne Biennial, France; The Alternator Gallery in Vancouver, British Columbia; Prospect 1 in New Orleans, and ZKM in Karlsruhe, Germany.

Herman Wallace died October 4, 2013, from liver cancer, a few days after he was released from prison. Sumell continues to be active in the movement to end the use of long-term solitary confinement in the United States. She continued as an advocate and spokesperson for Albert Woodfox, the remaining prisoner of the Angola 3, speaking frequently on his behalf at rallies, benefits and lectures. Ms Sumell's life and work is documented in the photo-journalistic essay here The last member, Albert Woodfox, did not gain release until February 2016. With the state preparing to try him a third time after two convictions were overturned, he accepted a plea deal of "no contest" for lower charges. He said his health and age required him to choose this course rather than go through another trial, as the state had said it would indict him.

== Solitary Gardens ==
Sumell embarked on another major project entitled the Solitary Gardens. This is a public art project created to protest solitary confinement and serve as an alternative land use. Sumell invites viewers to imagine a landscape without prisons.

The project uses the tools of prison abolition, permaculture, and alternative education to facilitate unexpected exchanges between persons in solitary confinement and volunteer communities on the "outside." The six-foot-by-nine-foot Solitary Gardens are built to the size of a US solitary cell and are "gardened" by prisoners through written exchanges with volunteers. Sumell (and other advocates of reform) suggest that the over-representation of African-American men in prison is one of the outcomes of the history of many of the United States as slave societies. Solitary Gardens will be constructed from the historic commodities of the South, worked by slaves: sugarcane, cotton, and indigo. It intends to show that slavery continues in another form. The project has been supported financially by the Nathan Cummings Foundation, Eyebeam NYC, New Orleans Redevelopment Authority (NORA) and the Robert Rauschenberg Foundation. Sumell still intends to build Herman's House in New Orleans, where Wallace spent his childhood and early adulthood before incarceration.
