= Herman's House =

2012 film by Angad Singh Bhalla

- Directed by: Angad Singh Bhalla
- Produced by: Ed Barreveld; Loring McAlpin; Lisa Valencia-Svensson
- Starring: Jackie Sumell; Herman Wallace
- Cinematography: Iris Ng
- Edited by: Ricardo Acosta
- Music by: Ken Myhr
- Production company: Storyline Entertainment
- Distributed by: First Run Features
- Release date: March 2, 2012 (True/False)
- Running time: 80 minutes
- Countries: Canada; United Kingdom; United States
- Language: English

Herman's House is a documentary film, directed by Angad Singh Bhalla and released in 2012. An American, British and Canadian coproduction, the film profiles Herman Wallace, a member of the Angola Three who had been in prison for over 40 years after his shorter prison term for bank robbery was extended with a disputed conviction for a murder he did not commit, and Jackie Sumell, a conceptual artist who has launched a project of building the dream house Wallace wishes he could live in if he is ever released from prison.

Wallace is never shown in the film, and instead is heard only in recorded telephone conversations with Sumell.

== Distribution ==
The film premiered at the 2012 True/False Film Festival, and had its Canadian premiere at the 2012 Hot Docs Canadian International Documentary Festival.

It was broadcast in July 2013 as an episode of the PBS documentary series POV.

== Awards ==
Bhalla was the winner of the Magnus Isacsson Award at the 2012 Montreal International Documentary Festival.

The film was a Donald Brittain Award nominee for best social or political documentary at the 2nd Canadian Screen Awards in 2014. Ricardo Acosta was nominated for Best Editing in a Documentary Program or Series, and Ken Myhr received a nomination for Best Music for a Non-Fiction Program or Series.

The film won an Emmy Award for Outstanding Arts and Culture Programming at the 2014 News and Documentary Emmy Awards.

== Legacy ==
Following Wallace's death of cancer in late 2013, Bhalla and digital media producer Ted Biggs created the interactive documentary project The Deeper They Bury Me: A Call from Herman Wallace, which was based around Wallace's time in solitary confinement, for the National Film Board of Canada.
