= Green Party of Louisiana =

- French name: Parti Vert de la Louisiane
- Chairperson: Naima Gayles & Christopher Stella
- Founded: 2002
- Membership (2026): ▲2,738
- Ideology: Green politics
- Political position: Left-wing
- National affiliation: Green Party of the United States
- Colors: Green

Website
- Official website

The Green Party of Louisiana is a state-level political party affiliated with the Green Party of the United States (GPUS). The nominee of the GPUS has been on every presidential ballot in the state since 1996.

The 2014 convention of the Green Party of Louisiana was held in New Orleans and featured former presidential nominee Jill Stein. The party's 2015 convention was held in Abita Springs, Louisiana.

== History ==
The Green Party of Louisiana was founded during a two-day convention which took place on August 31 and September 1, 2002, in New Orleans. The party was recommended for accreditation with the GPUS in 2003 and was officially qualified by the State of Louisiana on August 8, 2005.

In 2016, Dr. Jill Stein was the party's nominated candidate for president.

== Candidates ==
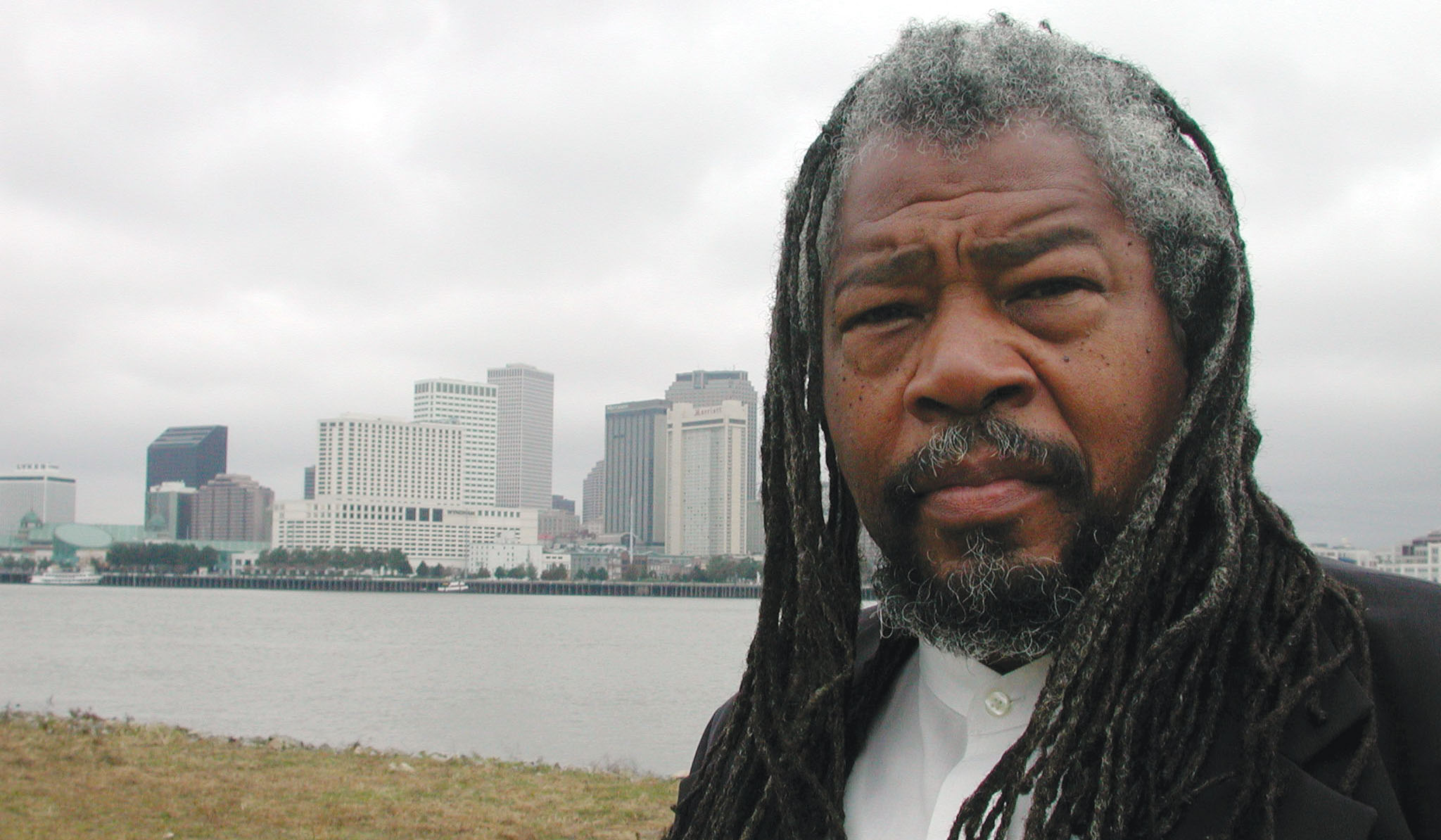
Publicity photo for Malik Rahim's campaign for City Council At-Large. New Orleans 2001.

In 2001, former Black Panther Party member and community organizer Malik Rahim ran for New Orleans City Council (at-large). Although the Green Party had not achieved ballot status in Louisiana, his candidacy was supported and endorsed by the nascent party, and the press recognized Rahim as a Green. His platform centered on criminal justice reform, workers rights (including a living wage referendum), and housing issues.

In 2003, the party fielded three candidates. Jason Neville ran for Louisiana State Senate in District 3, the first Green to qualify for state office. He finished in third place with 1,528 votes. Dan Thompson ran for Louisiana House of Representatives in District 105 and garnered 1,152 votes, finishing fourth (8%). Les Evenchick also ran for a House seat in District 93 and garnered 754 votes.

In 2007, Autumne Bankovic ran for Justice of the Peace in Caddo Parish, the first female candidate to run Green in Louisiana. She got 21.71% of the vote in a two-way race.

In 2008, Rahim was the Green Party's nominee for Louisiana's 2nd congressional district. His campaign included promises to enforce the Davis-Bacon Act, to push for reopening Charity Hospital, and to protect wetlands. The post-Katrina "right of return" for displaced residents was also a major theme. He finished third in a four-way race with 1,883 votes (2.82%).

A special election was held for Louisiana's 5th congressional district in 2013, and Eliot Barron ran for the office on the Green ticket, finishing 12th (out of 14) with 492 votes (0.5%). Barron ran again for the same office in 2014, finishing in 9th and last place with 1,655 votes (0.69%).

In 2015, Adrian "Ace" Juttner ran for Louisiana Commissioner of Agriculture and Forestry, the first Green to seek statewide office in Louisiana. He ran a low-budget campaign, on a platform which emphasized the benefits of legalizing marijuana and protecting honeybees. Although he finished in fourth place, with 36,180 votes (3.5%), this marked the Green Party's strongest showing in Louisiana to date, in terms of total votes or percentage, surpassing even Nader's 2000 presidential run (see below).

Barron again sought congressional office in 2016, this time in Louisiana's 1st district; he finished in 6th place (out of 7) with 6,717 votes (2.1%).

In 2018, Morgan Moss Jr. ran for mayor of Rayville and finished second in a field of three with 219 votes, representing 37% of the vote.

In 2021, Bart Everson ran for New Orleans City Council At-Large as a "climate change activist." He got 6.51% or 4,776 votes.

== Advocacy ==
After the 2016 Louisiana floods, the party called for "the rapid elimination of the fossil fuel economy" in the face of climate catastrophe.

== Presidential nominee results ==
Year	Nominee	Votes
1996	Ralph Nader	4,719 (0.26%)
2000	Ralph Nader	20,473 (1.16%)
2004	David Cobb	1,276 (0.10%)
2008	Cynthia McKinney	9,187 (0.47%)
2012	Jill Stein	6,978 (0.35%)
2016	Jill Stein	14,018 (0.7%)
