= Derrick Ashong =

Ghanaian musician

Derrick N. Ashong, also known as "DNA", (born 1975 in Accra, Ghana), is a producer, musician, and entrepreneur known for working with major figures including Oprah Winfrey, Steven Spielberg, and Dave Stewart of the Eurythmics.

== Background ==
Born in a house with no running water in Accra, Ghana in 1975, Ashong is the son of a pediatrician. He attended school in Brooklyn, Saudi Arabia, Qatar and Voorhees, New Jersey, before matriculating at Harvard College in 1997, where he studied Afro-American studies and was awarded the Hoopes Prize for his senior thesis. After being naturalized as an American citizen, he returned to Harvard through a Paul & Daisy Soros Fellowship for New Americans, and studied for a PhD in Ethnomusicology and Afro-American studies, until Dave Stewart of Eurythmics fame invited him to come work at his entertainment company, Weapons of Mass Entertainment. Ashong was a founding member of the Harvard Black Alumni Society and founded the Black Men's Forum.

== Personal ==
As a child growing up in the Middle East, Derrick Ashong had to sleep in a sealed room and wear a gas mask to school during the first Gulf War. One day at school, a sonic boom overhead resembled the sound of a bomb going off. Ashong and his classmates ducked for cover. He had to decide in a split second whether to put on his gas mask or offer it to a friend who did not have one. He attributes that experience, along with his pediatrician father and nurse mother, with the social conscience that has been the through line of his life's work.

=== Arts ===
Ashong's musical career started while at Harvard. He produced a musical entitled Songs We Can't Sing, for which he won awards, before forming a band called "Black Rose". The band later became known as Soulfège. Ashong has worked with such established artists as Debbie Allen, Janet Jackson, & Bobby McFerrin, and is MC and leader of Soulfège, under the name "DNA", producing works that have aired globally via outlets including MTV Africa, MNet Africa and BBC World Service.

In 1997, Ashong had a role in Steven Spielberg's Amistad, playing the character Buakei, a role he gained through attending an open audition in New York City. He also appeared in a 2006 documentary about the Angola 3, entitled 3 Black Panthers and the Last Slave Plantation. Ashong founded a talent agency, ASAFO Productions.

=== Public roles ===
Ashong is also the former host of The Derrick Ashong Experience on Oprah Radio, The Stream on Al Jazeera English, and DNAtv on Fusion (ABC/Univision). In 2012, Ashong and his team won a Royal Television Society Award and were nominated for a News & Documentary Emmy Award for their work on The Stream.

He received another Emmy nod in 2015, and yet another in 2016, for Take Back the Mic: The World Cup of Hip Hop, the flagship show of his digital media company, Amp.it, which launched at the beginning of 2015.

Derrick Ashong has lectured on music, technology, the free market, and individualism at over a hundred institutions in the United States, Africa, Europe, the Caribbean and Asia, including the World Music Expo WOMEX in 2003 in Spain, UK Parliament, the UN, the London School of Economics, and Harvard and Stanford Business Schools. He is the author of FREE THIS CD!!! - The FAM Manifesto - a text outlining the philosophy of open source music, which ultimately led him to found his company, amp.it that drives and measures digital video engagement by rewarding and recognizing fans for discovering, sharing and curating great content.

Ashong reached prominent media attention when a YouTube video went viral, of him speaking on Barack Obama's campaign to gain the Democratic nomination for the 2008 U.S. presidential election. Surprising the interviewer who expected a short soundbite (perhaps based on Ashong's casual appearance), Ashong gave a measured and protracted analysis of Obama's campaign. The video has been viewed more than a million times.

His L.A.-based tech company, called AMP Global, powered an original digital series called Take Back the Mic: The World Cup of Hip Hop, which was a 2015 and 2016 Emmy finalist in the category of Original Interactive Programming, opposite names that included Taylor Swift, backed by AmEx, and Oculus Rift, owned by Facebook. As a result of AMP Global's early success, Ashong attracted major production partners, including Flame Ventures, run by Tony Krantz, and ITV America, to bring fan-curated content to international audiences. In 2018, AMP Global was selected as one of 11 top startups in the world for Google Demo Day and is now bringing The Mic: Africa, the first-ever TV format born on the continent to be exported around the world, to TV screens across Africa and small screens around the world via the company's proprietary app, Take Back the Mic, which builds communities around the continent by rewarding fans for engaging.
