= Common Ground (Seattle) =

US nonprofit affordable housing developer

- Founded: 1980
- Founder: Steve Clagett
- Type: affordable housing developer
- Location: 419 Occidental Ave S # 201, Seattle, WA 98104-2886
- Region served: Washington State and surrounding areas
- Website: http://commongroundwa.org/

Common Ground is a nonprofit affordable housing developer in Seattle, Washington. Its primary goal is creating and preserving high-quality permanent and transitional housing for the homeless; it now also includes nonprofit facilities other than housing, such as community centers and medical buildings. The core of the organization are housing development specialists, who work together with existing nonprofit social service agencies, government agencies and housing authorities.

== History ==
In 1980, county planner Steve Clagett and other housing activists founded Common Ground in response to a growing housing crisis in the downtown core. The organization began helping local social service agencies and churches preserve and transform historic buildings into affordable housing, and identified sites and secured funding for new affordable housing units. The group helped preserve many downtown Seattle landmarks, including the Olive Tower, the St. Regis Hotel and the Josephinum.

The organization does not own or manage these facilities. Instead, like market-rate real estate developers, it puts together land deals, arranges financing and supervises construction for social service agencies and housing authorities. Clients include the Metro YMCA, Pioneer Human Services, Solid Ground and Downtown Emergency Service Center.

In the late 80s, they started to work with churches to provide housing for individuals with mental illness, establishing partnerships between mental health agencies and area churches. The churches rented houses to be used as group homes and the agency staff provided services and oversight. The experience led the organization into a new area of focus: special-needs housing.

Today, Common Ground has expanded throughout the state of Washington, working with more than 300 community-based organizations to develop more than 6,200 units of housing for people with low-income or special needs.

== Residences built in 2011 ==
As of August 2011 Common Ground has developed 5 buildings with 117 units.

Client Sponsor	Building	Location	Number of Units
Transitional Resources	Avalon Place	West Seattle	16
YWCA of Seattle, King County, Snohomish County	Passage Point	Maple Valley	46
Solid Ground	Brettler Family Place	Seattle	51
Valley Cities Counseling and Consultation	Auburn Four-Plex	Auburn	4

== See also ==
- Housing First
- Affordable housing
- Homelessness in the United States
- Common Ground (NYC)
