= Common Ground Relief =

US network of non-profit organizations

Common Ground Collective
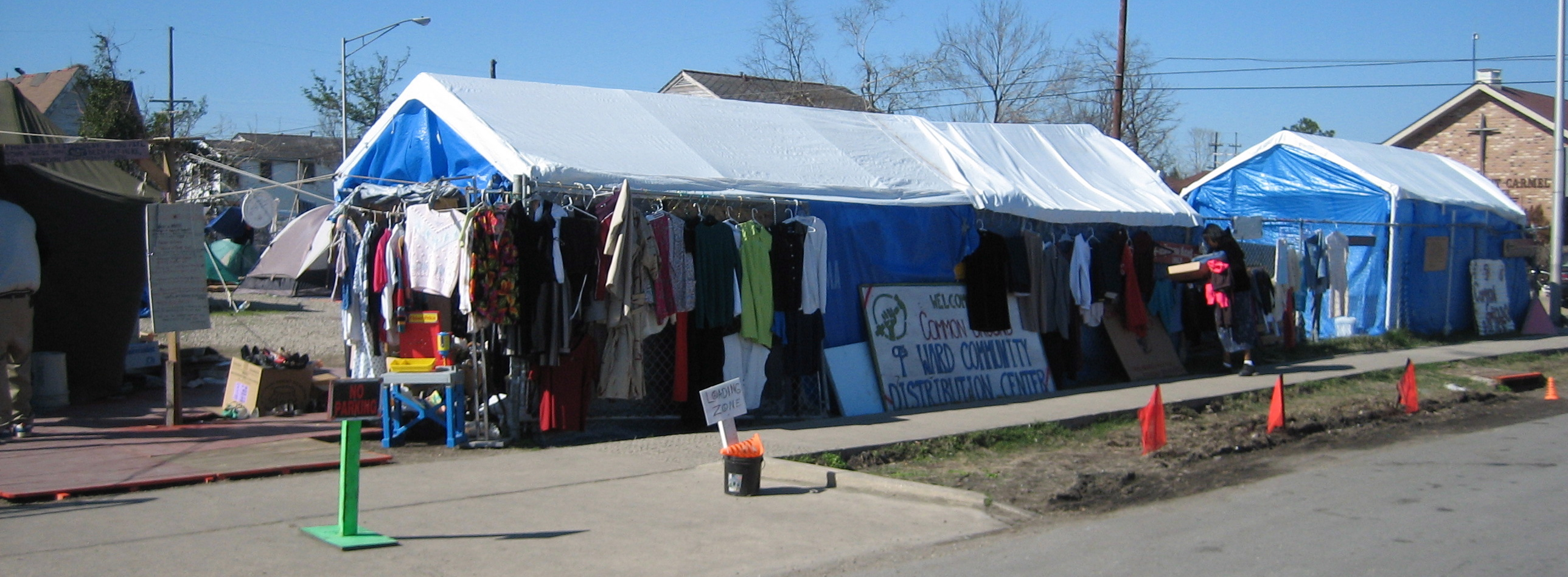
- Common Ground distribution center tents in the Upper 9th Ward of New Orleans
- Formation: September 2005; 21 years ago
- Type: Network of non-profit organizations
- Legal status: Active
- Purpose: To offer support to the residents of New Orleans
- Headquarters: 1800 Deslonde Street, New Orleans, Louisiana, U.S.
- Region served: New Orleans, Louisiana
- Subsidiaries: Common Ground Relief; Common Ground Tech Collective; New Orleans Women's Shelter; R.U.B.A.R.B. Bike Collective; Common Ground Health Clinic
- Website: www.commongroundrelief.org

The Common Ground Collective is a decentralized network of non-profit organizations offering support to the residents of New Orleans. It was formed in the fall of 2005 in the Algiers neighborhood of the city in the days after Hurricane Katrina resulted in widespread flooding, damage and deaths throughout the city.

== History ==
Common Ground Relief, or Common Ground Collective, was founded on September 5, 2005, based on the ideas of Malik Rahim, a local community organizer and former member of the Black Panther Party; Scott Crow, an anarchist organizer from Texas; and Sharon Johnson, a resident of Algiers neighborhood. Other key organizers included Jackie Sumell, Jimmy Dunson, Kerul Dyer, Suncere Shakur, Naomi Archer (Ana Oian Amets), Emily Posner, and Jenka Soderberg.

Common Ground started with delivery of basic aid (food, water, and supplies) that was arriving daily from the Veterans for Peace Bus. Led by Desert Storm Veteran Dennis Kyne, they carried food and supplies brought in from Camp Casey, Crawford, Texas. Plenty International would also play an instrumental role in the beginning of relief efforts and the establishment of a greatly needed medical clinic in Algiers. The effort expanded to providing assistance to homeowners and residents trying to move back into other areas of the city and region—such as the Lower Ninth Ward, St. Bernard Parish, and Houma—where flood-protection infrastructure had failed after the hurricane.

Common Ground Health Clinic had its beginnings when The Veterans for Peace allocated contributions to purchase medical supplies. This money would come from the messages Michael Moore sent to his followers. The first doctors and nurses providing services came through the VFP volunteer camp set up at PineView Middle School.

Providing outreach many volunteers began riding around on bicycles asking residents if they needed medical attention. Locals were surprised to be approached in this way, since no representatives of government agencies or of the Red Cross had appeared up to that point. The clinic offered first aid, took blood pressure, tested for diabetes, and asked about symptoms of anxiety, depression, and other disease. Common Ground volunteers helped to provide free services and home gutting in the Upper & Lower Ninth wards. As of March 1, 2009, more than 23,000 people, mostly young white people from throughout the United States and Europe, had volunteered with Common Ground Relief for various lengths of time. They worked in the predominantly black neighborhoods that were severely affected by flooding and damage from the storm, and where many residents were poor. An ABC News Nightline report described the volunteers as "mostly young people filled with energy and idealism, and untainted by cynicism and despair, and mostly white, [who] have come from across America and from countries as far away as Indonesia." The health clinic was especially helpful to remaining residents of New Orleans immediately after the hurricane since Charity Hospital and other emergency care providers were not available.

Common Ground Relief initiated a number of programs and projects following its inception in September 2005. Its organizing philosophy is dubbed "Solidarity Not Charity," reflecting the anarchist philosophies of many of its members. Some of the services and facilities they provided free to residents included debris removal, aid distribution centers, roving medical clinics, bioremediation for toxic areas, house-gutting, roof-tarping, building neighborhood computer centers, free tech support for non-profits, stopping home demolitions in the Lower 9th Ward, supporting community and backyard gardens, anti-racist training for volunteers, a tree planting service, and legal counselling services. Common Ground volunteers established seven health clinics and nearly 100 community garden projects within a year.

Common Ground Relief can boast one of the most multidisciplinary of all teams. There are (categories not mutually exclusive) nurses, doctors, psychiatrists, pharmacists, anarchists, herbalists, acupuncturists, community organizers, journalists, legal representatives, aid workers, proletarian neighborhood members, EMT's, squatters, gutter punks, artists, mechanics, chiropractors, clergy, and so forth involved. A huge sign outside the door reads, "Solidarity Not Charity" and this statement exemplifies the perspective of those involved.

— James Chionsini, Common Ground volunteer,

In early 2006, Common Ground Relief volunteers completed an unsanctioned clean-up of Martin Luther King Charter School in the Lower 9th Ward, which was subsequently reopened.

Common Ground Collective eventually split off into multiple independent organizations—Common Ground Relief, Common Ground Tech Collective, New Orleans Women's Shelter, R.U.B.A.R.B. Bike Collective, and the Common Ground Health Clinic. In November 2007 Thomas Pepper was the current operations director of Common Ground Relief.

== Woodlands Apartment Complex ==
In May 2006, Common Ground Relief (CGR) assumed management of the Woodlands Apartment Complex, a 350-unit complex of buildings. CGR management froze the rents at the Woodlands to pre-Katrina levels, helped create a tenants union, and ran a workers' cooperative with paid skills training. However, after 150 apartments were rehabilitated, owner Anthony Reginelli reneged on his verbal agreement with CGR and sold the building to Johnson Properties Group LLC. In November 2006, they took action to evict more than 100 families from the property. Common Ground Relief lost approximately $750,000 in payroll, landscaping, electrical, plumbing and carpentry expenditures.

== FBI infiltration ==
Brandon Darby, an Austin activist who moved to New Orleans to help after the hurricane and served as Director of Operations of Common Ground Relief from January to April 2007, admitted in 2008 to serving as an FBI informant in the months before the 2008 Republican National Convention. According to Democracy Now!, "Darby has admitted to wearing recording devices at planning meetings and wearing a transmitter embedded in his belt during the convention. Darby testified on behalf of the prosecution at the trial of David McKay of Midland, Texas who was arrested at the RNC on charges of making and possessing Molotov cocktails."

== Coastal wetlands restoration and preservation ==
In 2013, Common Ground Relief (CGR) initiated a new mission, "to create resilient Gulf Coast communities that are environmentally sustainable, financially viable, and personally cohesive." CGR leaders decided to focus on restoring and preserving Louisiana's coastal wetlands, providing opportunities for citizens to participate in protecting the environment.

In 2015, ten years after significant water damage from Hurricane Katrina had killed much of the hardwood trees in Bayou Sauvage National Wildlife Refuge, CGR volunteers planted green ash and willow saplings to begin restoring the maritime forest. The volunteers included French engineering students and teenagers from around the country, who were attending a summer service camp in New Orleans.

"To have a partner like Common Ground is super important, they're donating over $10,000 worth of trees. That's a huge amount of resources they're contributing to the project."

— David Stoughton, supervisory park ranger with the U.S. Fish and Wildlife Service,

== See also ==
- Nothing About Us Without Us
