= David McKay (activist) =

American political activist (born 1986)

David McKay (born 1986) is an American activist and artist known for his attempted protest of the 2008 Republican National Convention in Minneapolis and subsequent imprisonment based in part on testimony of FBI informant Brandon Darby.

McKay was born in Midland, Texas in 1986. Prior to his attempted protest of the 2008 Republican National Convention, McKay was not an active protester.

In 2008, McKay and several friends constructed several improvised shields and planned to travel to the convention and use them to block traffic, shield themselves from tear gas and bean bag guns, and in general to disrupt the convention. After they traveled to Minneapolis for the gathering, their shields were seized by police from a U-Haul trailer. FBI informant Brandon Darby and the group of 8 protestors, including Bradley Crowder then constructed several firebombs, which McKay alleged was entrapment by Darby. The house where they were staying was raided, the bombs seized, and the group arrested. Darby publicly revealed his role as an informant and testified against the protestors.

Crowder entered a plea deal of two years.

McKay went to trial. McKay got a hung jury of split 6-6, and was released pending retrial. The day before retrial, McKay tried to take a plea deal of two years imprisonment, where he also had to reverse his original statement that he had been "entrapped" by Brandon Darby. However, on May 21, 2009, U.S. Chief Judge Michael J. Davis sentenced McKay to four years in prison, citing an "obstruction of justice" sentencing enhancement and that McKay had not fully accepted responsibility for his own actions.

According to the Federal Bureau of Prisons manifest, McKay was released from prison on 04-06-12.
