= Common Ground Health Clinic =

US non-profit organization in Louisiana

The Common Ground Health Clinic is a non-profit organization that provides health care in Algiers and Gretna, Louisiana. Common Ground Health Clinic provides programs to address community health care needs through collaborative partnerships. The clinic started on September 9, 2005, just days after Hurricane Katrina devastated the Gulf Coast.

Common Ground Health Clinic had its beginnings when four young street medics showed up in Algiers a few days after the hurricane. They began riding around on bicycles asking residents if they needed medical attention. Locals were apparently surprised to be approached in this way, since no representatives of government agencies or of the Red Cross had appeared up to that point. The medics offered first aid, took blood pressure, tested for diabetes, and asked about symptoms of anxiety, depression, and other disease.

The clinic was originally set up in a mosque, the Masjid Bilal. Nurses, physicians, herbalists, acupuncturists, EMTs, social workers and community activists came from around the world to volunteer at Common Ground Health Clinic.

== Current ==
The clinic has filled part of the need left by the shuttering in the aftermath of the storm of Charity Hospital, a free public hospital that had served the citizens of New Orleans since 1736. To date, the clinic has recorded over 60,000 patient visits—all at no or low charge to the patient. Staff at the clinic also work in the community to address societal factors that contribute to ill health, such as systemic racism and poverty. Patient services include primary care, Spanish medical interpreting, mind-body medicine groups, herbal medicine, social work, acupuncture and testing for HIV.

The clinic is now located in the space formerly occupied by a corner grocery store, at 1400 Teche Street in the Algiers neighborhood of New Orleans. The budget for 2010 was approximately $1.3 million. In 2013 the clinic received Federally Qualified Health Clinic status.

== Awards and recognition ==
Dr. Ravi Vadlamudi, a Tulane University physician and first medical director after the storm, was recognized as one of the year's CNN Heroes for his efforts in opening the clinic in the aftermath of the storm.

The clinic was awarded the highest marks by the National Committee for Quality Assurance for its community-based care efforts.

The clinic has been featured in a number of national and international publications and television and radio shows.
