= Common Ground (memoir) =

Memoir by Justin Trudeau

- Author: Justin Trudeau
- Language: English, French
- Genre: Memoir
- Publisher: HarperCollins
- Publication date: October 20, 2014
- Publication place: Canada
- Media type: Print (hardback, paperback)
- Pages: 352
- ISBN: 978-1-4434-3337-2

Common Ground is a 2014 book by Justin Trudeau, the 23rd Prime Minister of Canada. Written while he served as Leader of the Liberal Party of Canada, Common Ground is a memoir of the experiences that shaped Trudeau from his childhood at 24 Sussex Drive to his entry into Parliament and leadership of the Liberal Party.

== Background and synopsis ==
The book was described by CBC as "widely seen as his attempt to define himself before his political opponents do it for him" and serves as both a political and personal memoir. Trudeau addresses his childhood, the breakup of his parents' marriage (Pierre and Margaret Trudeau), his mother's struggles with mental health issues, the death of his brother Michel, and his decision to run for public office.

== Reception ==
In The Tyee, Crawford Kilian labeled the book a Bildungsroman, writing that the biography was "a readable book that should be read, whatever your political views" and "reveals him as a very intelligent, observant, and an outgoing man, likely a smarter politician than his father ever was".
