= Brandon Darby =

American Conservative activist and blogger

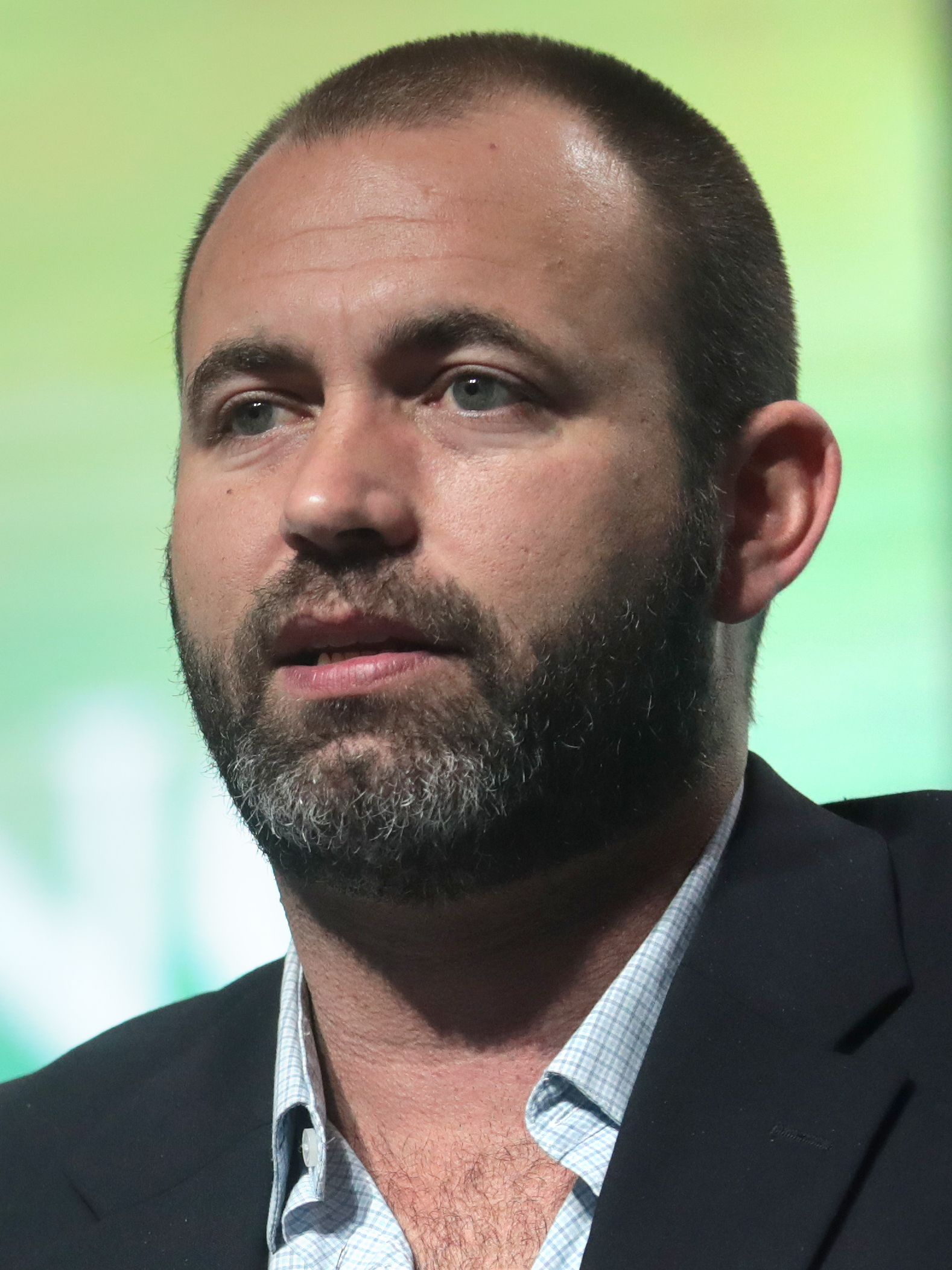
- Darby in 2019
- Born: Brandon Michael Darby; November 2, 1976 (age 49); Pasadena, Texas, U.S.
- Occupation: Blogger at Breitbart Texas division
- Known for: Social and political activism, FBI informant

Brandon Michael Darby (born November 2, 1976) is an American conservative blogger and activist. He first became known in the fall of 2005 for actions in New Orleans in efforts to help residents, where he was a co-founder of the Common Ground Collective organized there. It coordinated the efforts of hundreds of volunteers from across the country for years.

In late 2008, Darby acknowledged in an open letter that he had acted as an FBI informant in infiltrating protest groups before the 2008 Republican National Convention, held in Saint Paul, Minnesota. He testified in court against two men arrested on plans to commit domestic terrorism.

Darby became increasingly involved in conservative movements, including the Tea Party movement, despite not being registered to vote. He served as managing director of Breitbart Texas, a far-right news and opinion website.

== Biography ==
=== Early life ===
Darby was born in 1976 and raised in Pasadena, Texas, which is part of Greater Houston. As a teenager, Darby would often run away from home. He lived in group homes in Houston, Texas and the surrounding areas. He completed a GED. He later took classes to qualify for work as an emergency medical technician (EMT).

=== Early activism ===
Following the extensive damage in New Orleans by Hurricane Katrina in 2005, Darby was among numerous emergency medical personnel who went there in the first weeks to help the residents. With Malik Rahim and Scott Crow (the latter from Austin, Texas), he became a co-founder of Common Ground Relief, a non-profit relief organization that provided supplies and assistance to residents, including medical care, to residents of the city. He helped organize volunteers from across the country over the ensuing weeks and months, as CGR set up emergency clinics, distribution centers, and other aid. From January to April 2007, Darby served as Director of Operations for the organization.

Malik Rahim, on Democracy Now! claimed to be "heartbroken" at the revelation that Darby was an FBI informant. He also expressed regret at all the women who left Common Ground Relief due to Darby's behavior during his time at the organization, including claims that he sexually assaulted female organizers

==== 2008 Republican Convention activities ====
Darby started working as an FBI informant in November 2007, to infiltrate groups planning protests at the 2008 Republican National Convention in St. Paul, Minnesota. He gave the FBI information which led to the seizure of 34 homemade riot shields brought from Texas. Two activists from Texas, David McKay and Bradley Crowder, purchased materials for and constructed firebombs (Molotov cocktails) that they appear to have planned to use against state-owned vehicles. Evidence of the firebombs was seized in a raid by local police, which was supported by the FBI.

At McKay and Crowder's trial the question was raised whether Darby encouraged their escalation in violence. Specific claims about this were made by others in attendance at the protest (e.g., Gabby Hicks stated that Darby was "... the one to suggest violence, when the rest of us clearly disagreed..." and that "[a]s an older seasoned activist, Darby had a lot of sway over Crowder and McKay, making them susceptible to his often militant rhetoric"), suggesting that Darby acted as an agent provocateur. A former Darby girlfriend and various former colleagues allege that Darby informed for the FBI not due to patriotism or altruism, but for self-serving motives.

In a December 2008 open letter to his former fellow community organizers and activists, Darby acknowledged having worked as an informant for the FBI.

Neither Crowder nor McKay agreed to testify against the other in court. Rather than go to trial, Crowder accepted a plea agreement in 2009 on charges of possessing Molotov cocktails during the convention. He served 24 months in prison and three years of supervised release.

McKay took his case to trial, claiming entrapment by Darby. The trial ended with a hung jury, in a vote of 6-6. Jury interviews indicated that much of their discussion had concerned assessing the veracity of defendant McKay and witness Darby (the former claiming entrapment, the latter denying). A significant portion of the jury had voted to acquit based on their acceptance of Darby's representation of events. The prosecutor prepared to retry McKay's case.

Shortly before the retrial date in 2009, McKay accepted a 24-month plea deal sentence for the charges against him. He formally retracted his claim that Darby had entrapped him. Critics have suggested that both McKay and Crowder remained firm in their initial account of events, and that additional documentary evidence supported them. McKay's decision to take the plea deal was based on his awareness that 90% of federal cases result in convictions, and he was at risk of being sentenced to decades in prison if found guilty.

Following the plea arrangement, McKay pleaded guilty to possession of firearms and obstruction of justice. He was sentenced to 48 months in prison and three years of supervised release. The length of sentence was attributed to a charge of obstruction of justice, based on McKay's having initially claimed that Darby had entrapped him. David McKay and Bradley Crowder were still serving jail sentences as of late 2011.

In many left-wing activist communities, Darby has been criticized and ostracized for his role in McKay's conviction.

=== Career ===
Since 2008 Darby has promoted the Tea Party and speaks regularly across the United States, promoting conservative politics.
