= Chain (disambiguation) =

A chain is a series of connected links which are typically made of metal.

Chain may also refer to:

== Accessories and apparel ==
- Chain mail, a type of armor made of interlocking chain links
- Jewellery chain (or necklace), a type of jewelry which is worn around the neck

== Arts, entertainment, and media ==
=== Films and television ===
- Chains (film), a 1949 Italian melodrama film
- Chains (Blackadder), a 1986 episode of the British sitcom Blackadder II
- Chain (advertisement), a 1994 television advertisement for Guinness
- Chains of Love (TV series), a 2001 American dating game show adapted from a Dutch television series
- Chain (film), 2004, written and directed by Jem Cohen
- Chains, a 2009 short film starring TNA wrestler Kurt Angle

=== Literature ===
- Chains (play), 1909, by Elizabeth Baker
- Chain (play), 1992, by Pearl Cleage
- Chains (novel), a 2008 historical-fiction novel by Laurie Halse Anderson

=== Music ===
==== Albums and EPs ====
- Chain, a 1989 album by Paul Haig
- Chain (The Family Stand album), 1990
- Chain (Pylon album), 1990
- Chains (album), by Yōko Oginome, 1997
- Chain (Bonnie Pink EP), 2008
- Chain (KAT-TUN album), 2012
- Chain (NCT 127 EP), 2018

==== Songs ====
- "Chains" (Cookies song), 1962, covered by The Beatles
- "The Chain", a 1977 song by Fleetwood Mac
- "Chains", a song by Chicago from the 1982 album Chicago 16
- "Chains" (Patty Loveless song), 1990
- "Chain", a song by His Boy Elroy on their 1993 self-titled album
- "Chains" (Tina Arena song), 1994
- "Chains" (DLT song), 1996
- "Chain", a song by the Fire Theft from their 2003 self-titled album
- "Chains" (Nick Jonas song), 2014
- "Chains" (Usher song), 2015

==== Performers ====
- Chain (band), an Australian blues rock band active from the 1960s

== Business and economics ==
- Chain (real estate), a group of buyers/sellers that are linked together
- Chain of command, the line of authority and responsibility along which orders are passed
- Chain store, a retail shop outlets which share a brand and central management
- Chained dollars, used to express real dollar amounts adjusted over time for inflation
- Cinema chain, or movie chain
- Cold chain, a temperature-controlled supply chain
- Fast food chain
- Hotel chain
- Restaurant chain
- Supply chain, a coordinated system of organizations, people, activities, information and resources involved in moving a product or service from supplier to customer
- Value chain, a management concept first described by Michael Porter

== Mathematics ==
- Chain (ordered set), a totally ordered set, usually a subset of a given partially ordered set
- Chain (algebraic topology), a formal linear combination of k-simplices
- Chain complex, a generalization of the algebraic topology construct to homological algebra
- Chain rule, a tool for differentiation in calculus
- Chain sequence, numbers in the mathematical study of continued fractions
- Conway chained arrow notation, a way of expressing exponents using arrows
- Jordan chain, a sequence of linearly independent generalized eigenvectors of descending rank
- Markov chain, a discrete-time stochastic process with the Markov property
- Pseudo-arc, which has at its heart the concept of a chain

== Measurement ==
- Chain (unit), a unit of length
- Gunter's chain, measuring instrument
- New York City Subway chaining, method to specify locations along the New York City Subway lines

== Mechanics, engineering, and implements ==
- Bar-link chain (or block chain), a mechanical drive chain
- Bicycle chain, a roller chain that transfers power from the pedals to the drive-wheel of a bicycle
- Buffers and chain coupler, a railway device
- Catenary (or chain), the shape of a hanging flexible cable when supported at its ends and acted upon by a uniform gravitational force
- Chain Home and Chain Home Low, early British RDF (radar) systems of the WWII era
- Chain tool, a small mechanical device used to "break" a bicycle chain in such a way that it could be mended with the same tool
- Conveyor chain, a chain that conveys items in chain conveyor systems
- Drive chain, a way of transmitting mechanical power from one place to another
- Print chain on a chain printer
- Roller chain, most commonly used for transmission of mechanical power
- Self-lubricating chain, to eliminate the need for further lubrication
- Snow chains or tire chains, devices fitted to the tires of vehicles to provide maximum traction
- Timing chain, part of an internal combustion engine

== People with the name ==
- Ernst Chain (1906–1979), Nobel Prize–winning chemist famed for his isolation of penicillin
- John T. Chain Jr. (1934–2021), U.S. Air Force general

== Places ==
- Chain Bridge (Budapest), a suspension bridge that spans River Danube between Buda and Pest
- Chain Bridge (Potomac River), a bridge across the Potomac River at Little Falls in Washington, D.C.
- Chains (geological site), on the north-west plateau of Exmoor, Somerset, England
- Union Chain Bridge, a bridge between Northumberland, England and Berwickshire, Scotland

== Science ==
=== Chemistry ===
- Catenation, the bonding of atoms of the same element in a series, or chain
  - Polymer chain, structure of a polymer
- Chain reaction, a sequence of reactions where a reactive product or by-product causes additional reactions
- Ideal chain, a mathematical model of polymer folding
- Worm-like chain, a model in polymer physics used to describe the behavior of semi-flexible polymers

=== Other uses in science ===
- Electron transport chain, a sequence of chemical reactions yielding the transport of an electron through a membrane
- Food chain, a hierarchical or recursive list of predators and prey

== Sequences ==
=== Geological features ===
- Archipelago, a chain of islands
- Crater chain, a line of craters on the surface of an astronomical body
- Mountain range, a chain of hills or mountains

=== Other sequences ===
- Chain bridge, type of suspension bridge
- Chain crew, crew that manages signal poles in gridiron football
- Chain gang, group of prisoners chained together as a form of punishment
- Chain letter, a message that attempts to induce the recipient to make a number of copies of the message and then pass them on to one or more new recipients
- Chain of events, a number of actions and their effects that are linked together
- Chain smoking, practice of smoking several cigarettes/cigars in succession
- Chain stitch, in sewing and embroidery, a series of looped stitches that form a chain
- Chaining, a technique from applied behavioral analysis for teaching complicated tasks by breaking them into simpler steps
- Hudson River Chains, one of several chains used in blockades of the Hudson River
- Human chain (politics), a form of protest
- Signifying chain, in semiotics, an interlocking system of signifiers

== Other uses ==
- Chain (caste), a cultivating and fishing caste found in India
- Chains (nautical), small platforms on the sides of ships
- Fetter (Buddhism) (mental chain), a deeply rooted mental attachment preventing one from achieving liberation from suffering

== See also ==
- CHAIN (disambiguation)
- The Chain (disambiguation)
- Chain of Ponds (disambiguation)
- Chain of thought (disambiguation)
- Chained (disambiguation)
- Chane (disambiguation)
- Daisy chain (disambiguation)
- Serial (disambiguation)
