= Canadian High Arctic Ionospheric Network =

Radio instrument array in the Canadian Arctic

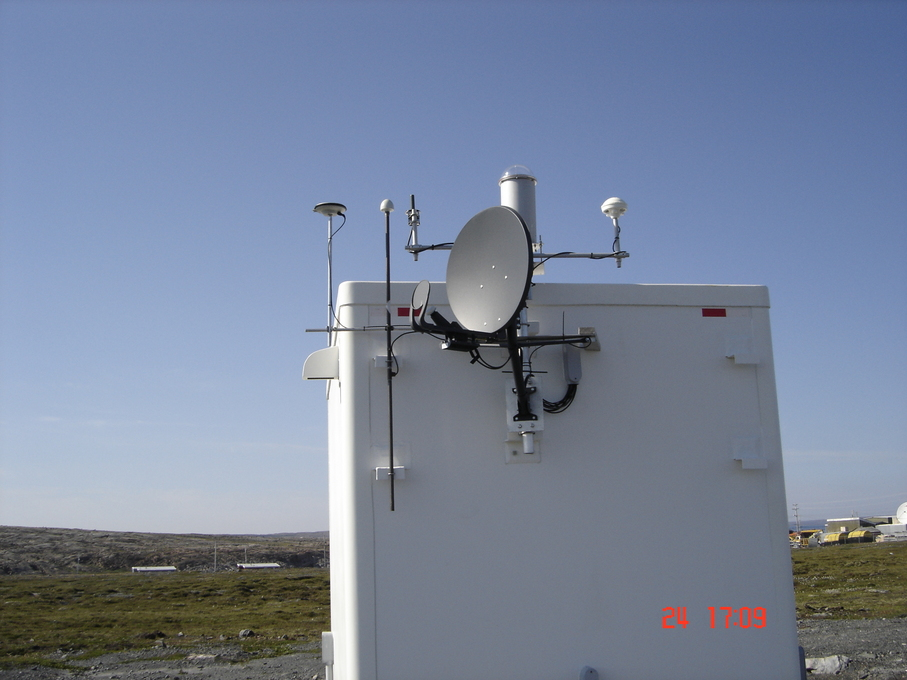
CHAIN site in Sanikiluaq, Nunavut

The Canadian High Arctic Ionospheric Network (CHAIN) is an array of ground-based radio instruments deployed in the Canadian Arctic and operated by the University of New Brunswick. The CHAIN instruments include high data-rate GPS receivers and digital ionosondes. After passing through the Earth's ionosphere, microwave GPS signals carry information about the total electron content (TEC). This information is commonly used to improve the precision of GPS and to study ionospheric morphology. Ionosondes transmit pulses of radio signals in the Medium Frequency (MF) and High Frequency (HF) ranges, whose echos are analyzed to measure height and density of the ionosphere. Advanced digital ionosondes used in the CHAIN network are also able to measure the bulk motion of ionospheric plasma.

Most of the CHAIN instruments are located within the polar cap defined as a region of open magnetic field lines. The polar cap ionosphere is directly linked to the interplanetary magnetic field carried by the solar wind. Polar cap thus provides a vantage point for the study of energy exchange between the solar wind, magnetosphere and ionosphere.

CHAIN is an integral part of the Canadian Geospace Monitoring (CGSM) programme. It provides ground support for Canadian and international scientific space missions such as THEMIS and CASSIOPE. CHAIN ionosonde and GPS data are used for tomographic reconstructions of polar cap plasma anomalies during geomagnetic storms

In January 2012, the Canada Foundation for Innovation announced funding for the Expanded Canadian High-Arctic Ionospheric Network (ECHAIN). This funding was used to add 15 Global Positioning System (GPS) receivers to the existing network of GPS receivers and radars of the Canadian High Arctic Ionospheric Network (CHAIN). The data will contribute significantly to the progress of space research by providing a better understanding of the processes in the Sun-Earth system.

== CHAIN instrument sites ==
Location	Station code	Coordinates	Instruments
Arctic Bay, Nunavut	arcc	73.00°N 85.03°W	GPS
Arviat, Nunavut	arvc	61.10°N 94.07°W	GPS
Cambridge Bay, Nunavut	cbbc	69.10°N 105.11°W	GPS, ionosonde
Churchill, Manitoba	chuc	58.76°N 94.09°W	GPS
Coral Harbour, Nunavut	corc	64.19°N 83.35°W	GPS
Eureka, Nunavut	eurc	79.99°N 85.90°W	GPS, ionosonde
Fort McMurray, Alberta	mcmc	56.65°N 111.22°W	GPS
Fort Simpson, Northwest Territories	fsic	61.76°N 121.23°W	GPS
Fort Smith, Northwest Territories	fsic	60.03°N 111.93°W	GPS
Gillam, Manitoba	gilc	56.38°N 94.64°W	GPS
Gjoa Haven, Nunavut	gjoc	68.63°N 95.84°W	GPS
Grise Fiord, Nunavut	gric	76.42°N 82.90°W	GPS
Hall Beach, Nunavut	halc	68.77°N 81.26°W	GPS, ionosonde
Iqaluit, Nunavut	iqac	63.73°N 68.54°W	GPS, ionosonde
Kugluktuk, Nunavut	kugcc	67.82°N 115.13°W	GPS
Ministik Lake, Alberta	edmc	53.35°N 112.97°W	GPS
Pond Inlet, Nunavut	ponc	72.69°N 77.96°W	GPS, ionosonde
Qikiqtarjuaq, Nunavut	qikc	67.56°N 64.03°W	GPS
Rabbit Lake, Saskatchewan	rabc	58.23°N 103.68°W	GPS
Rankin Inlet, Nunavut	ranc	62.82°N 92.11°W	GPS
Repulse Bay, Nunavut	repc	66.52°N 86.23°W	GPS
Resolute, Nunavut	resc	74.75°N 95.00°W	GPS, ionosonde
Sanikiluaq, Nunavut	sanc	56.54°N 79.23°W	GPS
Taloyoak, Nunavut	talc	69.54°N 93.56°W	GPS
