= CHAIN =

CHAIN may refer to:

- Controlled and Harmonised Aeronautical Information Network, a concept of EUROCONTROL to improve the quality of aeronautical data.
- Canadian High Arctic Ionospheric Network, an array of ground-based radio instruments

== See also ==
- Chain (disambiguation)
