= CGSM =

CGSM may refer to:

- Canadian Geospace Monitoring
- Consortium for Graduate Study in Management
- A 'consignment of geriatric shoe manufacturers' - a euphemism for 'a load of old cobblers' from the UK television comedy series Yes Minister.
