= Tsubakimoto Chain =

Japanese manufacturing company

Tsubakimoto Chain Co.
- Innovation in Motion

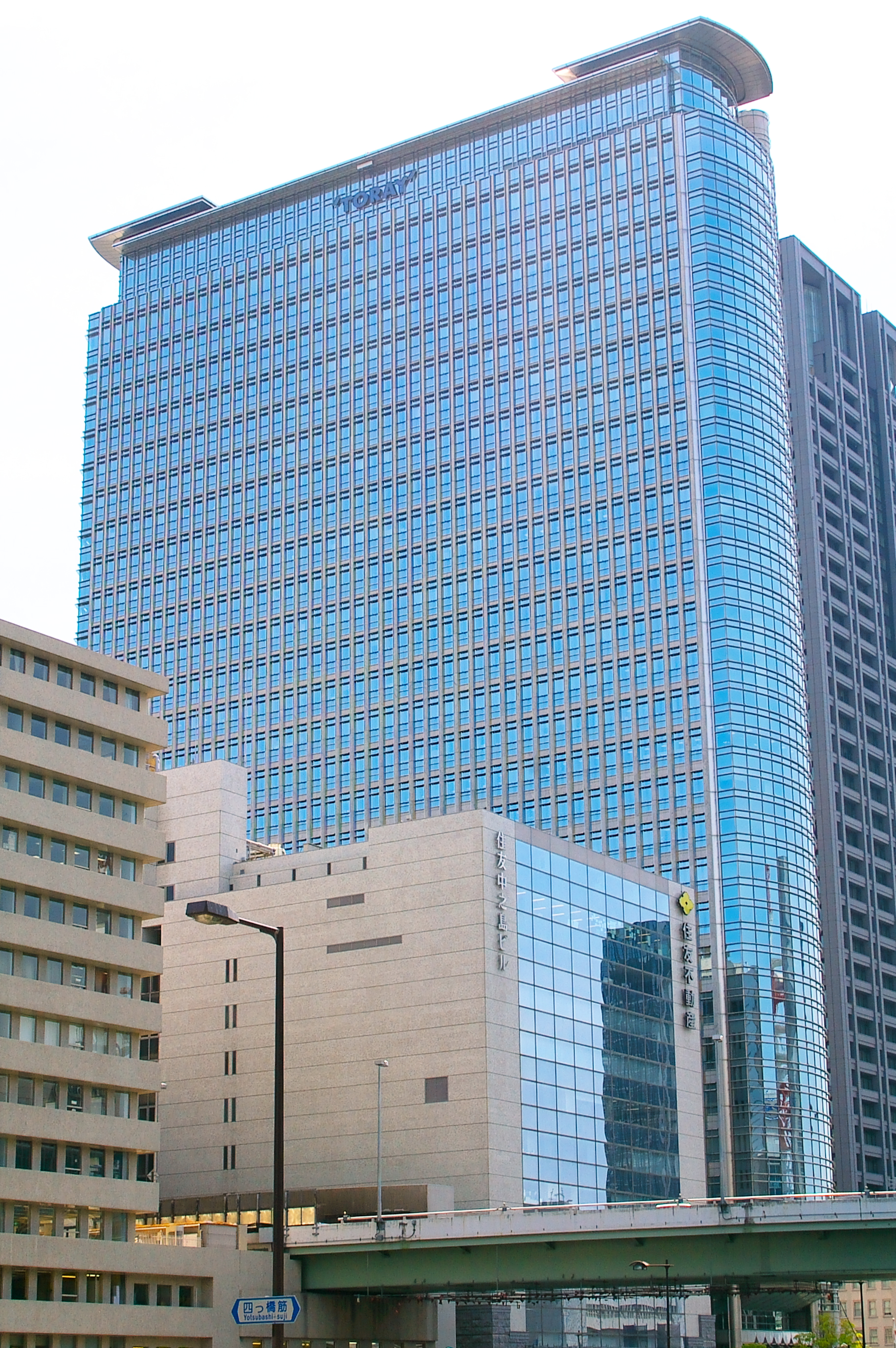
- Nakanoshima Mitsui Building, headquarters of Tsubakimoto Chain Co., in Kita-ku, Osaka, Japan
- Native name: 株式会社椿本チエイン
- Romanized name: Kabushiki-gaisha Tsubakimoto Chiein
- Formerly: Tsubakimoto Chain Manufacturing Company (1970); Tsubakimoto Shoten (1917)
- Type: Public
- Traded as: TYO: 6371
- ISIN: JP3535400000
- Industry: Power transmission products manufacturing; Materials handling systems manufacturing; Automotive timing drive systems manufacturing
- Founded: December 1917; 108 years ago in Nishinari-gun, Osaka (now Kita-ku, Osaka), Japan
- Founder: Setsuzō Tsubakimoto (椿本 説三, Tsubakimoto Setsuzō)
- Headquarters: Kita-ku, Osaka, Japan
- Number of locations: 82 (2021)
- Area served: Worldwide
- Key people: Kenji Kose (Chairman and CEO); Takatoshi Kimura (President and COO)
- Products: Automotive timing drive system; Conveyor chain; Gears; Hose and Cable carrier; Linear actuators; Materials handling systems; Cam clutch; Roller chain; Sprockets; Timing chain
- Brands: Tsubaki
- Services: Manufacturing
- Revenue: ▲¥215,879 million (2021)
- Operating income: ▲¥17,842 million (2021)
- Net income: ▲¥14,543 million (2021)
- Total assets: ▲¥332,620 million (2021)
- Total equity: ▲¥207,756 million (2021)
- Number of employees: 8,535 (2020)
- Divisions: Chain Operations; Motion Control Operations (PTUC); Mobility Operations (Automotive); Materials Handling Systems Operations; Others
- Subsidiaries: 64 consolidated subsidiaries, 8 unconsolidated subsidiaries and 9 affiliates
- Website: tsubakimoto.com

Tsubakimoto Chain Co. (株式会社椿本チエイン, Kabushiki-gaisha Tsubakimoto Chiein) (TYO: 6371) is a Japanese manufacturer of power transmission and roller chain products. It was founded in Osaka in 1917 as a bicycle chain manufacturer. Later it became the first roller chain manufacturer in Japan approved by Japanese Industrial Standards. Tsubakimoto Chain has the world's largest market share for steel chains for general industrial applications and enjoys the world's top market share for timing drive systems for automobiles. The company is headquartered in Osaka, with its main manufacturing base in Kyotanabe, Kyoto.

== History ==
Tsubakimoto Chain was established in 1917 by Setsuzo Tsubakimoto in Kita-ku, Osaka as a private enterprise known as Tsubakimoto Shoten manufacturing bicycle chains. They soon moved to roller chain and conveyor equipment production, ceasing bicycle chain manufacture in 1928. The following year, they registered as Tsubakimoto Chain Manufacturing Company.

With the completion of their Tsurumi Plant in Osaka in 1940, they launched as a joint-stock company with capital of three million yen in 1941. Setsuzo Tsubakimoto was appointed the company's first president. They changed their name to Tsubakimoto Chain Co. in 1970.

In 2000, Tsubaki completed work on its new, larger Kyotanabe Plant to meet its increasing production levels. With nearly 100,000 m2 of building floor space, the plant is the world's largest chain manufacturing facility.

== Products ==
Roller chain and sprockets, toothed belts and pulleys, hose and cable carrier systems, shaft coupling/locking, reducer/variable speed drives, motion control/clutch, overload protectors, linear actuators, automotive timing belt systems, conveyance, sorting, and storage systems, bulk handling systems, metalworking chips handling and coolant processing systems.

== Profile ==
- Corporate name: Tsubakimoto Chain Co. (株式会社椿本チエイン, Tsubakimoto Chiein Kabushiki-gaisha)
- Headquarters: Nakanoshima Mitsui Building, 6F, 3-3-3, Nakanoshima, Kita-ku, Osaka, 530-0005 Japan
- Kyotanabe Plant: 1-1-3, Kannabidai, Kyotanabe, Kyoto 610-0380 Japan
- Saitama Plant: 20, Shinko, Hanno, Saitama 357-8510 Japan
- Kyoto Plant: 1-1, Kotari -Kuresumi, Nagaokakyo, Kyoto 617-0833 Japan
- Hyogo Plant: 1140, Asazuma-cho, Kasai, Hyogo 679-0181 Japan

== Principal Group Companies ==
=== Japan ===
- Tsubakimoto Custom Chain Co.
- Tsubakimoto Sprocket Co.
- Tsubaki Yamakyu Chain Co.
- Tsubakimoto Iron Casting Co., Ltd.
- Tsubakimoto Machinery Co.
- Tsubakimoto Bulk Systems Corp.
- Tsubakimoto Mayfran Inc.
- Tsubaki Support Center Co.

=== Overseas ===
==== Americas ====
- U.S. Tsubaki Holdings, Inc. (headquarters)
- U.S. Tsubaki Power Transmission, LLC (manufacturing base)
- U.S. Tsubaki Automotive LLC (manufacturing base)
- U.S. Tsubaki Industrial LLC (manufacturing base)
- Tsubaki Kabelschlepp America, Inc.
- Tsubaki Brasil Equipamentos Industriais Ltda.
- Central Conveyor Company, LLC
- Central Process Engineering, LLC
- Electrical Insights, LLC
- KCI, Incorporated
- Tsubaki of Canada Limited (headquarters and manufacturing base)
- Mayfran International. Incorporated
- Conergics International LLC
- Press Room Techniques Co.
- Tsubakimoto Automotive Mexico S.A. de C.V. (manufacturing base)

==== Europe ====
- Tsubakimoto Europe B.V.
- Tsubakimoto U.K. Ltd.
- Tsubaki Deutschland GmbH
- Tsubaki Automotive Czech Republic s.r.o.
- Tsubaki Ibérica Power Transmission S.L.
- Tsubaki KabelSchlepp GmbH
- KabelSchlepp GmbH - Hunsborn
- KabelSchlepp Italia S.A.R.L.
- Metool Products Limited
- KabelSchlepp France S.A.R.L.
- Kabelschlepp Systemtechnik spol. s r.o.
- OOO Tsubaki KabelSchlepp
- Schmidberger GmbH
- Mayfran U.K. Limited
- Mayfran GmbH
- Mayfran Limburg B.V.
- Mayfran International B.V.
- Mayfran France S.A.R.L.
- Mayfran CZ s.r.o.

==== Indian Ocean Rim ====
- Tsubakimoto Singapore Pte. Ltd.
- PT Tsubaki Indonesia Manufacturing
- PT Tsubaki Indonesia Trading
- Tsubaki Power Transmission (Malaysia) Sdn. Bhd.
- Tsubakimoto (Thailand) Co., Ltd.
- Tsubaki India Power Transmission Private Limited
- Tsubakimoto Vietnam Co., Ltd.
- Tsubakimoto Philippines Corporation
- Tsubaki Australia Pty. Limited
- Tsubakimoto Automotive (Thailand) Co., Ltd.
- Tsubaki Motion Control (Thailand) Co., Ltd.
- Kabelschlepp India Private Limited
- Tsubaki Conveyor Systems India Private Limited

==== China ====
- Tsubakimoto Chain (Shanghai) Co., Ltd.
- Tsubaki Motion Control (Shanghai) Co., Ltd.
- Tsubakimoto Automotive (Shanghai) Co., Ltd.
- Tsubaki Everbest Gear (Tianjin) Co., Ltd.
- Tsubakimoto Chain (Tianjin) Co., Ltd.
- Tsubakimoto Bulk Systems (Shanghai) Corp.
- Kabelschlepp China Co., Ltd.
- Tianjin Tsubakimoto Conveyor Systems Co., Ltd.
- Tsubakimoto Mayfran Conveyor (Shanghai) Co., Ltd.
- Tsubaki CAPT Power Transmission (Shijiazhuang) Co., Ltd.

==== Korea and Taiwan ====
- Taiwan Tsubakimoto Co. (manufacturing base)
- Taiwan Tsubakimoto Trading Co., Ltd.
- Tsubakimoto Automotive Korea Co., Ltd.
- Tsubakimoto Korea Co., Ltd.

== News ==
- U.S. Tsubaki Power Transmission LLC Company Profile (a subsidiary of Tsubakimoto Chain Co.)

=== 2022 ===
- Roller chain upgrade reduces costs for pizza making operation

=== 2019 ===
- U.S. Tsubaki Holdings Inc.’s Conveyor Operations Division and U.S. Automotive LLC open a new manufacturing facility in Portland, TN

=== 2018 ===
- Extracting the benefits of customised chain solutions
- Tsubakimoto Chain Installs PV System at Its New Manufacturing Plant
- New State Capital Sells Central Conveyor to U.S. Tsubaki Holdings, Inc.

=== 2016 ===
- Maintenance-Free Chain Helps Provide Long Term Flood Control

=== 2015 ===
- GM Announces 2014 Supplier of the Year Winners

=== 2014 ===
- For When an Ordinary Chain Just Won’t Do
- Mahindra Conveyor Systems group firm forms joint venture with Japanese Tsubaki
- Patent Issued for Conveyor Chain
- Tsubakimoto Chain Co.: Patent Issued for Silent Chain Having Deformable Guide Plates
- Toyota Supplier Sees China Sales Doubling on Orders From VW, GM

=== 2013 ===
- Toyota supplier considers China capacity boost on VW, GM orders

=== 2012 ===
- U.S. Tsubaki Launches New Interactive Website and Centralized Product Platform to Better Serve Engineers (Packing Digest)
- Cam clutches meet safety requirements (Mining Weekly)
- Cable carriers with multiple band design master high additional loads (Materials Handling World Magazine)
- Tsubakimoto Expects Record Auto-Parts Sales on Carmakers Rebound (Bloomberg Businessweek)

=== 2011 ===
- 1st foreign plant completed in BJFEZ (Korea Times)
- Toyota Announces Supplier of the Year Awards (Reliable Plant)
- How do we break the cycle that swings from lowest cost to highest quality? (Industrial Technology)
- Getting more life from roller chain (Motion System Design)
- FlexLink and Tsubakimoto Chain Co. signed JV (Flexlink)
- Tsubaki is named IADA supplier of the year in its first term of partnership (Process and Control Today)

=== 2010 ===
- Tsubaki buys KabelSchlepp to lead its cable-carrier division (Drives & Controls)
- Taking Aim at 21st Century "Korean Special Procurement Demand" Archived 2011-07-19 at the Wayback Machine (Nikkei Business)

=== 2009 ===
- Electric Cars Push Japan Engine Parts Makers to Crisis Mode (Bloomberg)
- Energy-saving conveyor chains from Tsubaki (European Design Engineer Magazine)
- Japan's Tsubakimoto Chain to build South Korean Plant (Nikkei)
- Tsubakimoto Chain Co. ranks 24th overall in the latest Patent Scorecard (Wall Street Journal - Market Data Center)
- Roller chain drives offer longer life, even in harsh environments (engineerlive)

=== 2008 ===
- Chains offer better grip for packaging (engineerlive)
- Tsubakimoto Chain 9-mth group results (Reuters)

=== 2007 ===
- Specialty chains meet underground conveying demands (Mining Weekly)
- Lube-free chain another link in product portfolio (Engineering News)

=== 2006 ===
- "Motion Industries Recognizes 26 Suppliers with Operational Excellence Supplier Partnership Awards". Business Wire. September 28, 2006.
- Clarion, NGK, Tsubakimoto, Tokyo Steel: Japanese Equity Preview (Bloomberg article tracking the company's stock)
- 220 summer jobs lined up for youths Archived 2007-09-27 at the Wayback Machine (Article about U.S. Tsubaki involvement in a local jobs program)
- Tsubaki Corrosion Resistant DP Series Chain Lasts Twice as Long as Standard Chain and is Still Going Strong at Scottish Water (Spotlight article in Process and Control Today)

=== 2005 ===
- Tsubaki Low Noise Chain Gives the 'Silent Treatment' to Industrial Laundry Machines (Spotlight article in Process and Control Today)
- Lady Godiva Rides In Coventry City Centre Again Thanks to Tsubaki's Weather Proof PC Chain (Spotlight article in Process and Control Today)

== See also ==
- List of companies of Japan
- List of automobile manufacturers of Japan
