= Chain of Ponds =

Chain of Ponds may refer to:

- Chain of Ponds, South Australia, a locality
- Chain of Ponds, Maine, a township
- Chain of Ponds Inn, a heritage listed building in Australia

== See also ==
- Chain (disambiguation)
