= The Chain (disambiguation) =

"The Chain" is a 1977 song by Fleetwood Mac.

The Chain may also refer to:

- The Chain (1984 film), an English comedy drama film
- The Chain (1996 film), an American action film
- Zanjeer: The Chain, a 1998 Indian action film
- The Chain (2014 film), a Peruvian anthology drama film
- The Chain (album), a 2007 album by Deana Carter
- 25 Years – The Chain, a Fleetwood Mac compilation album
- "The Chain", a song from Everybody (Ingrid Michaelson album), 2009
- "The Chain" (Buffy comic), the 5th issue of the Buffy the Vampire Slayer Season Eight comics
- The Chain, a feature on the radio show Radcliffe & Maconie on BBC Radio 6 Music (formerly on BBC Radio 2)
- The Chain (novel), a 2019 novel by Adrian McKinty

== See also ==
- Chain (disambiguation)
