= SPEDAS =

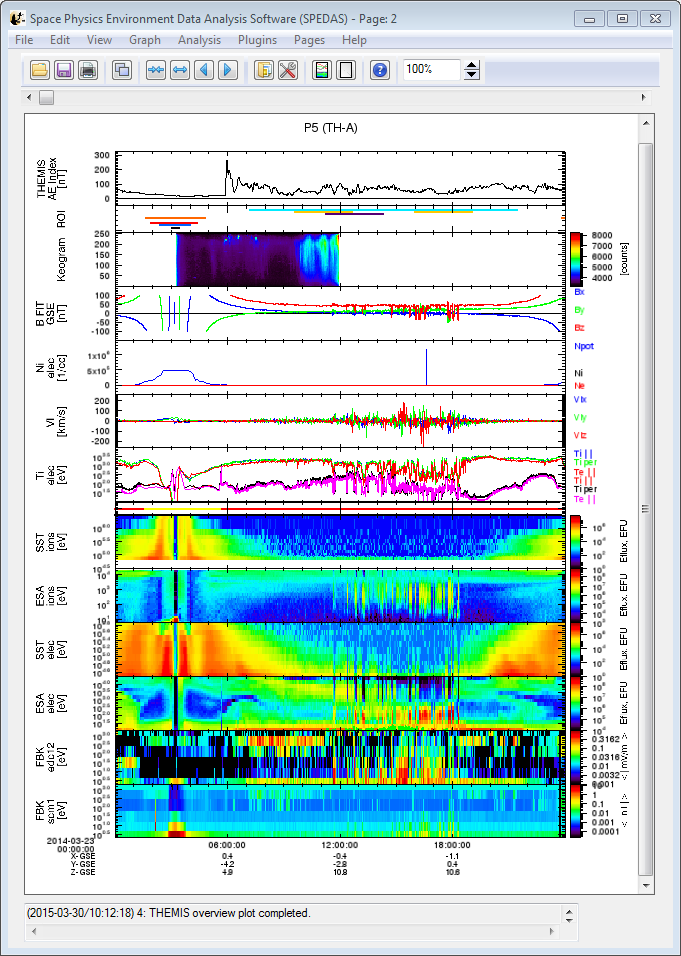
- The main window of SPEDAS
- Initial release: August 29, 2014
- Stable release: 6.1 / May 1, 2024; 2 years ago
- Preview release: nightly build / daily
- Written in: IDL
- Operating system: Cross-platform
- Size: 40 MB (compressed)
- Type: Scientific software
- Website: wiki.spedas.org

SPEDAS (Space Physics Environment Data Analysis System) is an open-source data analysis tool intended for space physics users. It was developed using Interactive Data Language (IDL). Since its creation, the tool has also been ported to Python in the form of a program referred to as pySPEDAS.

== Overview ==
SPEDAS is free software that can download and manipulate data from scientific space missions. It contains both a GUI (graphical user interface) and a command line mode for advanced users. It offers various tools for performing calculations and transformations of the data and for visualizing the results. Software modules can be developed for SPEDAS, extending its capabilities. It also includes a tool for downloading data from NASA servers using CDAWeb.

SPEDAS evolved from software developed for the THEMIS mission, which was called TDAS (THEMIS Data Analysis Software). In turn, TDAS used IDL code developed previously for earlier missions going back to the 1990s.

SPEDAS was developed by scientists and programmers of the University of California, Berkeley's Space Sciences Laboratory, University of California, Los Angeles's IGPP and other contributors.

== Deployment ==
Three different types of SPEDAS deployment are available:

- Source code. The full IDL code for SPEDAS is available as a zip file download. To use this, users must install and license IDL from Exelis.
- Save file. IDL save files can run in a free but restricted version of IDL, called IDL Virtual Machine (VM). Users have to download IDL VM from Exelis, install it and register with Exelis before they can use the SPEDAS save file.
- Executable file. This distribution contains executable files for Windows, Linux and Mac OS. In this case, users do not have to separately install and download anything else.

== Plugins ==
One of the main goals of SPEDAS is to accommodate the needs of different NASA missions. Towards this goal, its architecture is modular. Users can develop plugins for loading data, for configuration and for specialized calculations or operations on the data.

As of version 3.1, SPEDAS includes plugins for loading data from the following missions or data sets:

- THEMIS
- MMS
- GOES
- WIND
- ACE
- IUGONET
- ERG
- OMNI
- Geomagnetic/Solar indices

Plugins for specialized calculations are:

- Generation of GOES overview plots
- Generation of THEMIS overview plots
- THEMIS particle distribution slices
