= Chained =

Chained may refer to:

- Chained (1934 film), starring Joan Crawford and Clark Gable
- Chained (2012 film), a Canadian film directed by Jennifer Lynch
- Chained (2020 film), a Canadian film directed by Titus Heckel
- "Chained" (Marvin Gaye song), 1968
- "Chained" (The xx song), 2012
- Chained, a 2008 album by Crystal Eyes
- "Chained", a 1974 song by Rare Earth

== See also ==
- Chain (disambiguation)
