= Vassilis Angelopoulos =

Greek American physicist

Vassilis Angelopoulos (Greek: Βασίλης Αγγελόπουλος; born February 13, 1965) is a physicist specializing in space plasma physics and a professor in the Department of Earth, Planetary, and Space Sciences at the University of California, Los Angeles (UCLA). His research concerns particle acceleration, magnetic energy conversion in Earth's magnetosphere, and the interaction of the Moon with the solar wind. He is the principal investigator of NASA's THEMIS and THEMIS–ARTEMIS missions and led the development and operation of UCLA's ELFIN CubeSat mission.

== Career and research ==
Angelopoulos joined UCLA in 2007. His research examines how energy supplied by the solar wind is stored and released in Earth's magnetosphere, how particles are accelerated, and how magnetospheric currents affect the upper atmosphere and ionosphere.

=== THEMIS and magnetic reconnection ===
As principal investigator of THEMIS (Time History of Events and Macroscale Interactions during Substorms), Angelopoulos led the development of a mission combining five spacecraft with over twenty ground-based observatories including magnetometers and all-sky imaging cameras. The mission launched in February 2007 and is still active in an extended-science phase.

In a 2008 study led by Angelopoulos, simultaneous observations at multiple locations in Earth's magnetotail showed magnetic reconnection preceding auroral intensification and disruption of the near-Earth electric current. The results supported tail reconnection as the trigger of magnetospheric substorms, addressing the competing explanations that substorms begin with reconnection farther down the magnetotail or current disruption nearer Earth. His subsequent research has included identifying where magnetic energy is converted in the magnetotail.

=== THEMIS–ARTEMIS and the lunar plasma environment ===
Angelopoulos is also principal investigator of ARTEMIS (Acceleration, Reconnection, Turbulence and Electrodynamics of the Moon's Interaction with the Sun), which repurposed two THEMIS spacecraft to investigate the lunar plasma environment. Transfer maneuvers began in 2009, followed by operations near the Earth–Moon Lagrange points in 2010. The two spacecraft entered lunar orbit in June and July 2011.

The mission extended the scientific use of existing spacecraft from Earth's magnetosphere to the Moon. Its two probes provide measurements of the solar wind, the Moon's plasma wake and the interaction of the Moon with Earth's magnetotail. Simultaneous observations from two locations allow researchers to investigate plasma processes and particle acceleration around the Moon. Angelopoulos's ARTEMIS research includes magnetic reconnection and turbulence in the magnetotail and solar wind, lunar crustal magnetic fields, and particle reflection near the Moon.

=== ELFIN and student training ===
At UCLA, Angelopoulos proposed and oversaw the development, launch and operation of the two ELFIN CubeSats, which deorbited in September 2022. More than 400 UCLA undergraduates received training through the project under the mentorship of Angelopoulos and his research group. The mission produced numerous peer-reviewed publications and ranks among the highest-impact CubeSat missions per dollar.

== Education ==
- 1986: B.S. in physics, Aristotle University of Thessaloniki, Greece
- 1988: M.S. in physics, UCLA
- 1993: Ph.D. in physics with specialization in Space Plasma Physics, UCLA

== Honors and awards ==
- American Geophysical Union Fred Scarf Award (1993)
- COSPAR Zeldovich Medal (2000)
- American Geophysical Union Macelwane Medal (2001)
- American Geophysical Union Fellow
- 2024: NASA Outstanding Public Leadership Medal.
- 2025: American Geophysical Union James Van Allen Lecture.
