= Pearl Cleage =

American novelist (born 1948)

- Born: December 7, 1948 (age 77); Springfield, Massachusetts, U.S.
- Occupations: Novelist; essayist; playwright; poet
- Writing career
- Genre: African-American literature
- Notable works: What Looks Like Crazy on an Ordinary Day; Chain
- Website: PearlCleage.net at the Wayback Machine (archived 2020-12-14)

Pearl Cleage (/klɛɡ/ KLEG; born December 7, 1948) is an African-American playwright, essayist, novelist, poet and political activist. She is currently the Playwright in Residence at the Alliance Theatre and at the Just Us Theater Company. Cleage is a political activist. She tackles issues at the crux of racism and sexism, and is known for her feminist views, particularly regarding her identity as an African-American woman. Her works are highly anthologized and have been the subject of many scholarly analyses. Many of her works across several genres have earned both popular and critical acclaim. Her novel What Looks Like Crazy on an Ordinary Day (1997) was a 1998 Oprah Book Club selection.

== Early life and education ==
Pearl Cleage was born on December 7, 1948, in Springfield, Massachusetts, and is the younger of two daughters of Doris Cleage (née Graham), an elementary school teacher, and Rev. Albert Cleage, founder of the Pan African Orthodox Christian Church and the Shrine of the Black Madonna. Her father changed his name to Jaramogi Abebe Agyeman in conjunction with the founding of his church. After backlash resulting from her father's radical teachings, the family moved to Detroit, Michigan, where Rev. Cleage became a prominent civil rights leader. Within his church and as a political activist, he fostered a community of black empowerment. Pearl Cleage grew up surrounded by activists in her own family and community. She listened to writers speaking at her father's church and met prominent figures of the Civil Rights Movement as they stopped by her house on their way to rallies, both of which were experiences that shaped her future aspirations and career.

In an article by Cassandra Spratling, Cleage is described as having been a "curious child," always seeking out a story. She knew that she wanted to write since she was two years old. Cleage graduated from Detroit Public Schools' Northwestern High School in 1966. From 1966 to 1969, Cleage enrolled at Howard University in Washington, D.C., where she studied playwriting and produced two one-act plays as a student. In 1969 she moved to Atlanta, Georgia, where she married politician Michael Lomax, whom she later divorced in 1979. In Atlanta, she attended Spelman College, where she attained a bachelor's degree in drama in 1971. Upon graduation from Spelman, Cleage enrolled in graduate school at Atlanta University.

== Career ==
Cleage always knew she wanted to be a writer, and has maintained her career for 40 years. She has made contributions to the literary world through several mediums as a playwright, essayist, novelist and poet. She takes pride in her ability to write across different genres and enjoys doing so. Prior to pursuing a career in creative writing, in the 1970s, she was the press secretary and speechwriter for Maynard Jackson, Atlanta's first Black mayor. However, she felt constrained in this role as a writer because she was writing the thoughts of someone else. This dissatisfaction prompted her to leave this job and pursue becoming an author.

Cleage has held positions at multiple theaters and institutions; from 1986 to 1991, Cleage was a Cosby Endowed Chair professor at Spelman College in Atlanta, Georgia. She was dubbed the Playwright in Residence at Spelman in 1991. She also spent some time teaching at Smith College. Cleage holds positions as the Playwright in Residence and artistic director of the Just Us Theater Company. In 2013, Cleage became the Playwright in Residence at the Alliance Theatre in Atlanta through the National Playwright Residency Program funded by the Andrew W. Mellon Foundation and administered by HowlRound. The initial three-year term was renewed for an additional three years in 2016. Cleage is documenting her residency with frequent writings in the HowlRound journal.

Not only is Cleage a member of the relatively small group of African American female playwrights, but it is made even smaller by her age and notable contributions to major theaters. Cleage had her introduction to playwriting in the 1980s, producing her first play, Puppetplay, in 1981, which was followed by Hospice (1983), Good News (1984) and Essentials (1985). In the 1990s, she produced three of her most well-known works (Flyin' West (1992), Blues for an Alabama Sky (1995) and Bourbon at the Border (1997)) at the Alliance Theatre in partnership with artistic director Kenny Leon. Flyin' West (1992) has since surpassed a dozen productions all over the country, including a run at the Kennedy Center and other notable productions in New York and Atlanta; it was the most produced new play in 1994. In 1996, Blues for an Alabama Sky (1995) was performed as part of the Cultural Olympiad coinciding with the Summer Olympics held in Atlanta that year.

Cleage has also made significant journalistic contributions and is the founder of the literary magazine Catalyst and has been its editor since 1987. In the 1990s, she had a recurring column in the Atlanta Tribune called "Stop Making Sense." She has also had articles published in other major newspapers and magazines, including Essence and The New York Times Book Review.

Cleage started writing novels in the mid-1990s. She notably writes about topics at the intersection of sexism and racism, specifically on issues such as domestic violence and rape in the black community. She has been a supporter of the Obama administration. Cleage is an activist for AIDS and women's rights, experiences from which she draws for her writings. She also speaks at colleges, universities, and conferences on topics including domestic violence, the citizen's role in a participatory democracy, and writing topics.

== Personal life ==
In 1969, Cleage married Michael Lomax, an Atlanta politician and past president of Dillard University in New Orleans, Louisiana. They had a daughter, Deignan Njeri. The marriage ended in divorce in 1979. In 1994, Cleage married Zaron Burnett Jr., writer and director for the Just Us Theater Company. She has four grandchildren.

In 2014, Cleage published a compilation of her personal journal entries titled, Things I Should Have Told My Daughter: Lies, Lessons, and Love Affairs. She originally intended to share the entries with her granddaughter. In the book, she chronicles the details of her life from age 11 to age 29, including having an abortion, affairs with married men, and the use of alcohol and other drugs when she felt stuck and out of touch with creativity for her writing.

In addition to being a writer, Cleage is also a political activist. She closely identifies with growing up in the 1960s, and the three major social movements of the time (the Civil rights movement, Antiwar movement, and the Women's Movement) have closely shaped the themes of her writing. As noted in an article by Frida Scott Giles, Cleage self-identifies as "a third[-]generation black nationalist and a radical feminist".

Through her life and works, Cleage emphasizes and exemplifies the idea of "Free Womanhood," a term she coined with its first use in her speech at the Spelman College convocation in 1995. Through this theme and way of life, Cleage imparts a message of hope and motivation to Black women in a world where they are victimized from multiple angles. In the introduction to her book, Mad at Miles: A Black Woman's Guide to Truth (1990), she states: "I am writing to expose and explore the point where racism and sexism meet. I am writing to help understand the full effects of being black and female in a culture that is both racist and sexist." Through the lifestyle of "Free Womanhood," she poses tangible and concrete solutions to the unique challenges facing Black women.

In an interview for Marita Golden's book The Word: Black Writers Talk about the Transformative Power of Reading and Writing (2011), Cleage mentions her access to an abundance of books written by black people as a factor in her love for reading and writing. Within the interview, Cleage talks about her family expressing the idea that as a writer, she must write about the struggle of black people. She did not find this thought limiting or oppressive. Other inspirations came from her being the owner of a book store and cultural center at one of her fathers' congregations of The Shrine of the Black Madonna. At the book store, artists from the Black Arts Movement would meet. Cleage was inspired by the constant conversations about blackness, and was comfortable in her place within the topic.

== Works ==
Cleage's highly anthologized works can be found in Double Stitch (1991), Black Drama in America, New Plays from the Women's Project, and Contemporary Plays by Women of Color (1996); Flyin' West and Other Plays (1999) is a full anthology of all of her plays through the year of its publication. Her work has the been subject of many scholarly analyses and critical essays.

=== Novels ===
- The Brass Bed and Other Stories (1991; ISBN 0-88378-127-1)
- What Looks Like Crazy on an Ordinary Day (1997; ISBN 0-380-97584-X)
- I Wish I Had a Red Dress (2001; ISBN 0-694-52418-2)
- Some Things I Never Thought I'd Do (2003; ISBN 0-345-45606-8)
- Babylon Sisters: A Novel (2005; ISBN 0-345-45609-2)
- Baby Brother's Blues (2006; ISBN 0-345-48110-0)
- Seen It All and Done the Rest (2008; ISBN 0-345-48113-5)
- Till You Hear From Me (2010; ISBN 0-345-50637-5)
- Just Wanna Testify (2011; ISBN 0-345-50636-7)

=== Plays ===
- Puppetplay (1981)
- Hospice (1983)
- Good News (1984)
- Essentials (1985)
- Porch Songs (1985)
- Come Get These Memories (1987)
- Chain (1992)
- Late Bus to Mecca (1992)
- Flyin' West (1992; ISBN 0-8222-1465-2)
- Blues for an Alabama Sky (1995; ISBN 0-8222-1634-5)
- Bourbon at the Border (1997; ISBN 0-8222-2075-X)
- We Speak Your Names: A Celebration, with Zaron W. Burnett (2006; ISBN 0-7861-7442-0)
- A Song for Coretta, (2008; ISBN 978-0-8222-2239-2)
- What I Learned in Paris
- The Nacirema Society (2013; ISBN 978-0822229520)
- Tell Me My Dream (2015)
- Angry, Raucous and Shamelessly Gorgeous (2019)

=== Essays ===
- Mad at Miles: A Black Woman's Guide to Truth (1990; ISBN 0-9628142-0-2)
- Deals with the Devil and Other Reasons to Riot (1993; ISBN 0-345-38278-1)
- Things I Should Have Told My Daughter: Lies, Lessons and Love Affairs (2014; ISBN 978-1451664690)

=== Poetry ===
- Dear Dark Faces: Portraits of a People (1980)
- One for the Brothers (1983)
- We Speak Your Names: A Celebration (2005)

=== Themes and motivations ===
Cleage focuses on issues surrounding race and gender across all of her works, particularly how these challenges overlap in the lives of Black women. Her works have been shaped by the political and social movements of the 1960s, which she experienced first hand. The themes of her writing are fueled by a sense of responsibility to the members of the Black female community, as she writes about the real lives of Black women, inspired by personal experiences and those of women she is close to. Her works have evolved over time to reflect the issues and difficulties facing the community with which she identifies, and, as she gets older, in addition to being Black and being a Women, age becomes part of her identity; these newer challenges are now being reflected in her work, as can be observed in her most recent play: Angry, Raucous and Shamelessly Gorgeous (2019). Many of her novels are set in neighborhoods in Atlanta, Georgia.

Cleage does not shy away from showcasing sensitive topics in her works, particularly as they relate to complex issues surrounding race and gender, such as portrayal of domestic violence. These themes are at the center of many of her works, mentionably the plays Flyin' West (1992), Blues for an Alabama Sky (1995), and Bourbon at the Border (1997). Critics have commented that these works appear to constitute a trilogy, though they are not marketed that way. The same characters appear throughout these three plays, and, as noted in an essay by Benjamin Sammons, they share the common themes of "violence, freedom, and traumatic memory" present in the lives of Black communities. Cleage introduces these topics as a way to encourage understanding and conversation.

Critics have also noted her style of recounting historic events, done not through depictions of well-known figures, but through fictional stories of the lives of everyday people navigating these events. In doing so, she helps people understand their individual unique roles and impacts on history.

Though the characters are fictional, Cleage's plays are not made up. They represent real stories, lives, and emotions—particularly those found in urban African American communities. Cleage is motivated by a sense of responsibility to share the dark truths, while simultaneously imparting a message of hope and love for humanity, embracing all of its flaws. She does not believe in censorship, as it creates an unreal expectation of what life should be, particularly for younger generations of women. She owns the role of openly sharing to young people the realities of good and bad life choices and their effects.

Throughout Cleage's work, she has stated her desire to present African American women as they navigate the world daily. An example of this in her work is discussed in Black Feminism in Contemporary Drama (2008) by Lisa Anderson. Anderson talks about Cleage's portrayal of African American women in her play Flyin' West (1992), where Cleage shows formerly enslaved African American women creating a community and working to remain free. Cleage has stated that black women in America are her main audience, but she welcomes all audiences to her work.

== Reception ==
Many of her works across several genres have earned both popular and critical acclaim. They have been applauded in major publications, including the New York Times, Washington Post, and Essence magazine, as well as recognized by other established writers. She received one of her first awards in 1991 for Outstanding Columnist from the Atlanta Association of Black Journalists. In 1983 she garnered multiple forms of recognition, including five AUDELCO awards for her off-Broadway one-act play, Hospice (1983). That same year, she won the Bronze Jubilee Award for Literature and had a record-breaking audience attendance at her productions of Puppetplay (1983).

Her novel, What Looks Like Crazy on an Ordinary Day (1997), is one of her most recognized works, having spent nine weeks on The New York Times Best Seller list. It was picked for Oprah's Book Club in September 1998 and later won the Black Caucus of the American Library Association Literary Award. Two of her other novels have also been recognized: I Wish I Had a Red Dress (2001) was named Best Work of Fiction by the Georgia Writers Association, and Baby Brother's Blues (2006) received the NAACP Image Award for Outstanding Literary Work – Fiction in 2007. The Suzi Bass Awards, recognizing achievement in the Atlanta theatre community, honored Cleage with a Gene-Gabriel Moore Playwriting Award in 2008 and with a lifetime achievement award in 2020. She received the Sankofa Freedom Award in 2010 and the Theatre Legend Award at the Atlanta Black Theatre Festival in 2013. She was inducted into the Atlanta Business League's Women's Hall of Fame in 2020 and the Georgia Writers Hall of Fame in 2021. The Goodman Theatre hosted a Pearl Cleage Fest from September 14 - October 15, 2023 that included productions of her plays at several Chicago theaters plus readings, workshops, and other events.

== See also ==
- American literature
- African-American literature
- Womanism
