= Chane =

Chane may refer to:

- Chané, an indigenous people of South America
- Chané language, an extinct Amerindian
- Chañe, a municipality in Spain
- Chane, Bhiwandi, a village in Bhiwandi taluka, India
- Chane (mayfly), a genus of insects
- Chane Behanan, American basketball player
- John Bryson Chane, American bishop

== See also ==
- Chanes (disambiguation)
- Chain (disambiguation)
