= THEMIS =

NASA satellite of the Explorer program

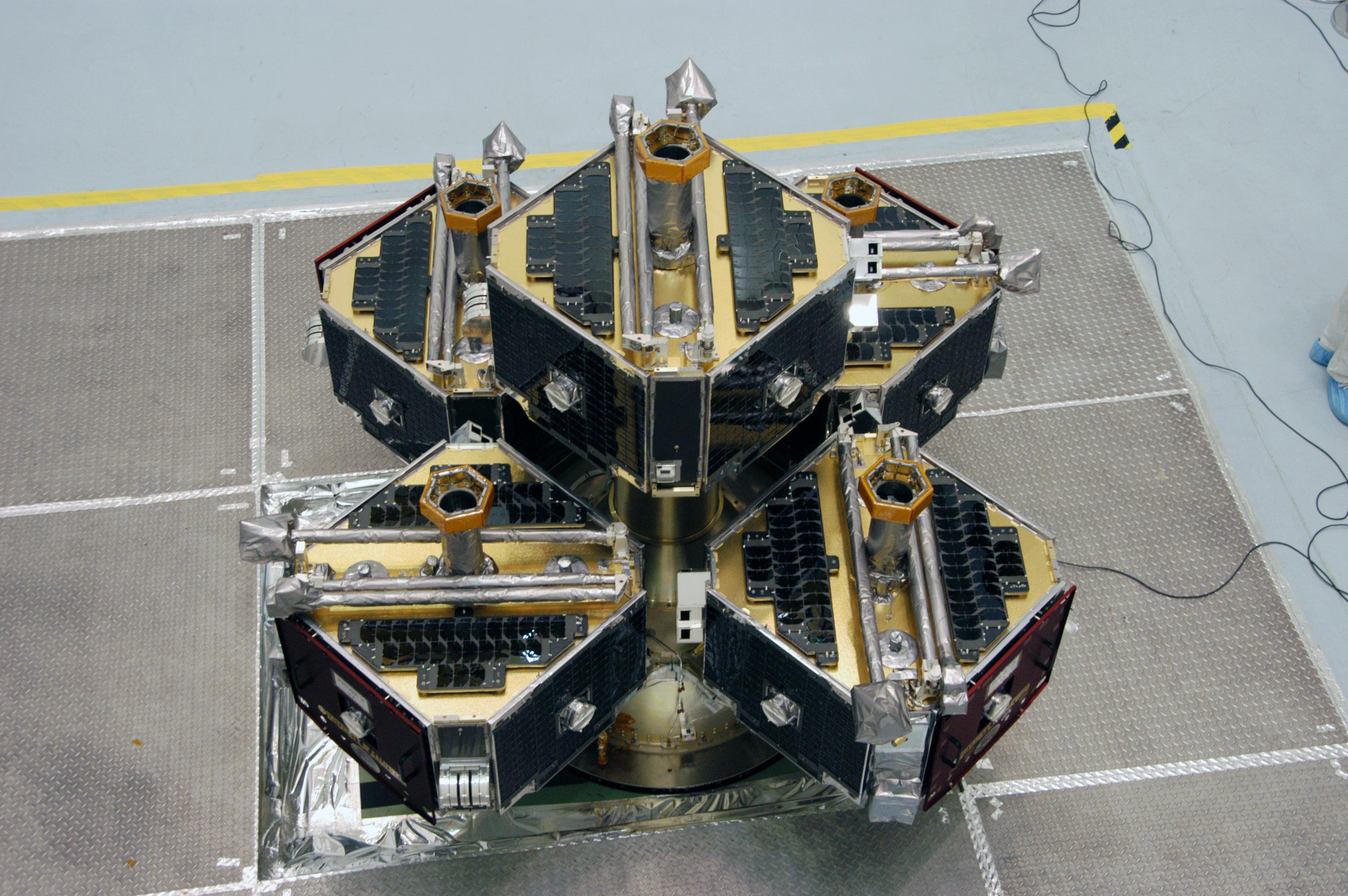
- Five THEMIS satellites
- Names: Explorer 85 – THEMIS-A – THEMIS-P5 – MIDEX-5A * Explorer 86 – THEMIS-B (ARTEMIS-P1) – THEMIS-P1 – MIDEX-5B * Explorer 87 – THEMIS-C (ARTEMIS-P2) – THEMIS-P2 – MIDEX-5C * Explorer 88 – THEMIS-D – THEMIS-P3 – MIDEX-5D * Explorer 89 – THEMIS-E – THEMIS-P4 – MIDEX-5E
- Mission type: Magnetospheric research
- Operator: NASA
- COSPAR ID: 2007-004 (A, B, C, D, E)
- SATCAT no.: 30580, 30581, 30582, 30583, 30584
- Website: http://themis.igpp.ucla.edu/
- Mission duration: Planned: 2 years Elapsed: 19 years, 1 month and 16 days

Spacecraft properties
- Spacecraft: Explorer LXXXV
- Spacecraft type: Time History of Events and Macroscale Interactions during Substorms
- Bus: THEMIS
- Manufacturer: Swales Aerospace
- Launch mass: 126 kg (each)
- Power: 37 watts (each)

Start of mission
- Launch date: 17 February 2007, 23:01:00 UTC
- Rocket: Delta II 7925-10C (Delta 323)
- Launch site: Cape Canaveral, SLC-17B
- Contractor: Boeing Defense, Space & Security
- Entered service: 4 December 2007

Orbital parameters
- Reference system: Geocentric orbit
- Regime: Highly Elliptical Orbit
- Perigee altitude: 470 km (290 mi)
- Apogee altitude: 87,330 km (54,260 mi)
- Inclination: 16.00°
- Period: 1870.00 minutes

Instruments
- Electric Field Instruments (EFI); Electrostatic Analyzer (ESA); Fluxgate magnetometer (FGM); Search-coil magnetometer (SCM); Solid State Telescope (SST)
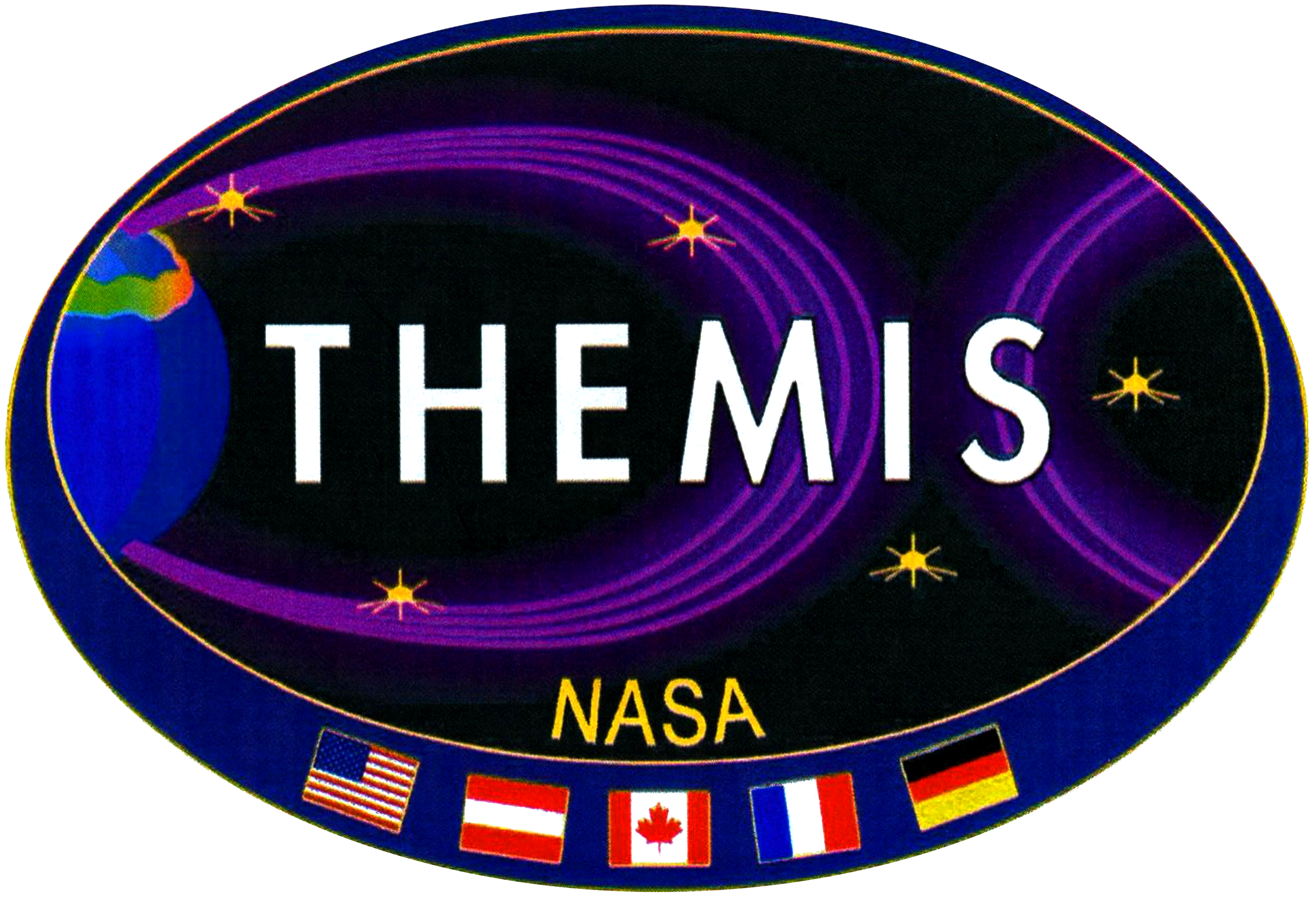
- THEMIS mission patch Explorer program

Time History of Events and Macroscale Interactions during Substorms (THEMIS) mission began in February 2007 as a constellation of five NASA satellites (THEMIS-A through THEMIS-E) to study energy releases from Earth's magnetosphere known as substorms, magnetic phenomena that intensify auroras near Earth's poles. The name of the mission is an acronym alluding to the Titan Themis.

Three of the satellites orbit the Earth within the magnetosphere, while two have been moved into orbit around the Moon. Those two were renamed ARTEMIS for Acceleration, Reconnection, Turbulence and Electrodynamics of the Moon's Interaction with the Sun. THEMIS-B became ARTEMIS-P1 and THEMIS-C became ARTEMIS-P2. ARTEMIS-P1 and -P2 together comprise the THEMIS–ARTEMIS mission.

The THEMIS satellites were launched 17 February 2007 from SLC-17B aboard a Delta II launch vehicle. Each satellite carries five identical instruments, including a fluxgate magnetometer (FGM), an electrostatic analyzer (ESA), a solid state telescope (SST), a search-coil magnetometer (SCM) and an electric field instrument (EFI). Each probe has a mass of 126 kg (278 lb), including 49 kg (108 lb) of hydrazine fuel.

THEMIS data can be accessed using the SPEDAS software. Canada, Austria, Germany, and France also contributed to the mission.

== Spacecraft ==
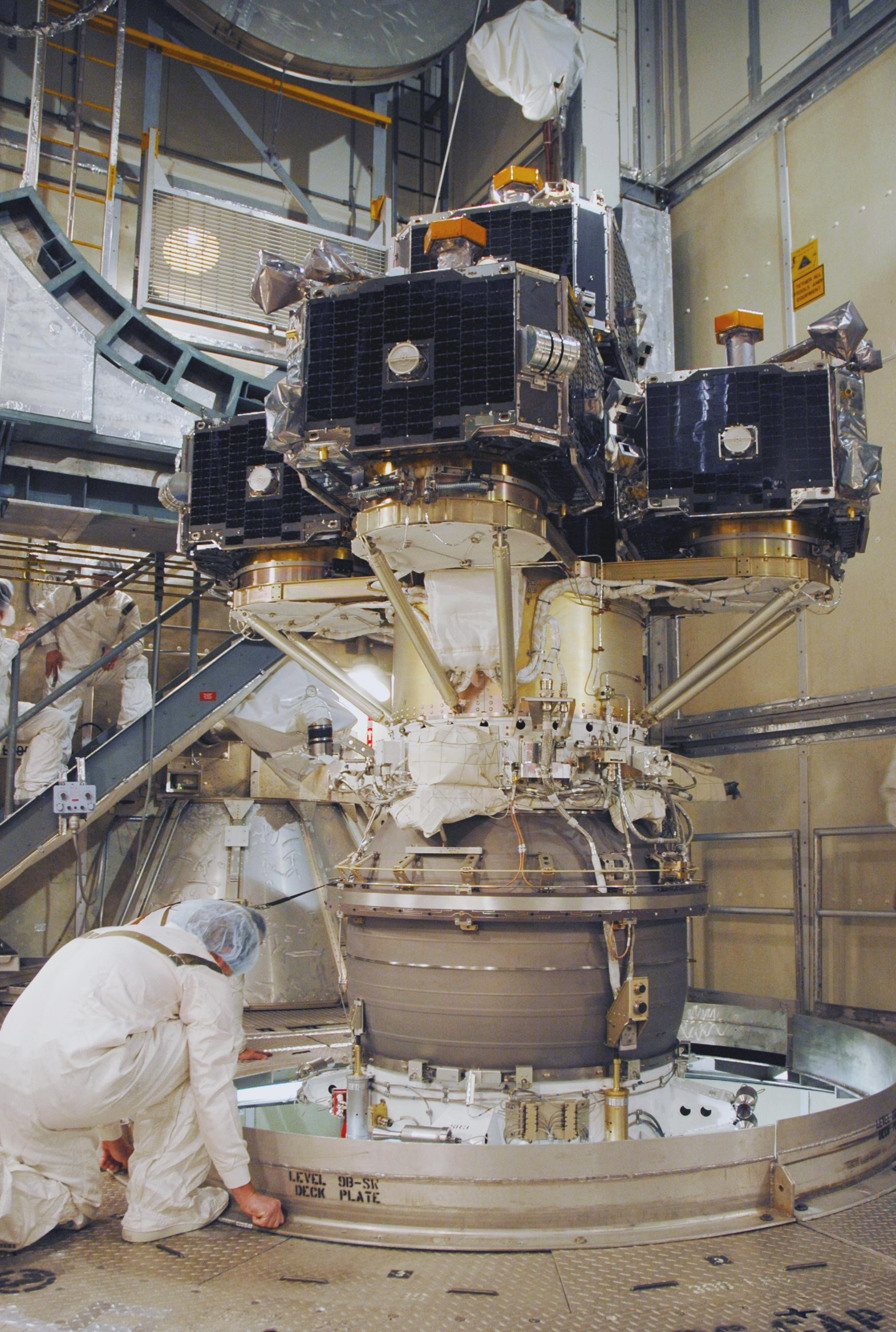
Satellites before installation of the fairings

Swales Aerospace, now part of Orbital ATK which is now part of Northrop Grumman, Beltsville, Maryland, manufactured all five probes for this mission. Each was built-up and tested at the Beltsville facility, before being delivered to University of California, Berkeley for instrument integration. Swales was responsible for integrating the BAU, IRU, Solar arrays, antenna, battery, and other components necessary for functionality. This was the second major satellite built by Swales, the first being the Earth Observing-1 (EO-1) spacecraft, which continues to orbit Earth. Swales was also responsible for designing and building the Electrical Ground Support Equipment (EGSE) used for monitoring the probes during all phases of pre-launch activities, including use at the launch site.

== Testing ==
After the installation of instruments at SSL, Berkeley, pre-launch testing including thermal-vacuum, vibration and acoustic tests, was conducted at NASA's Jet Propulsion Laboratory in Pasadena, California.

== Launch ==
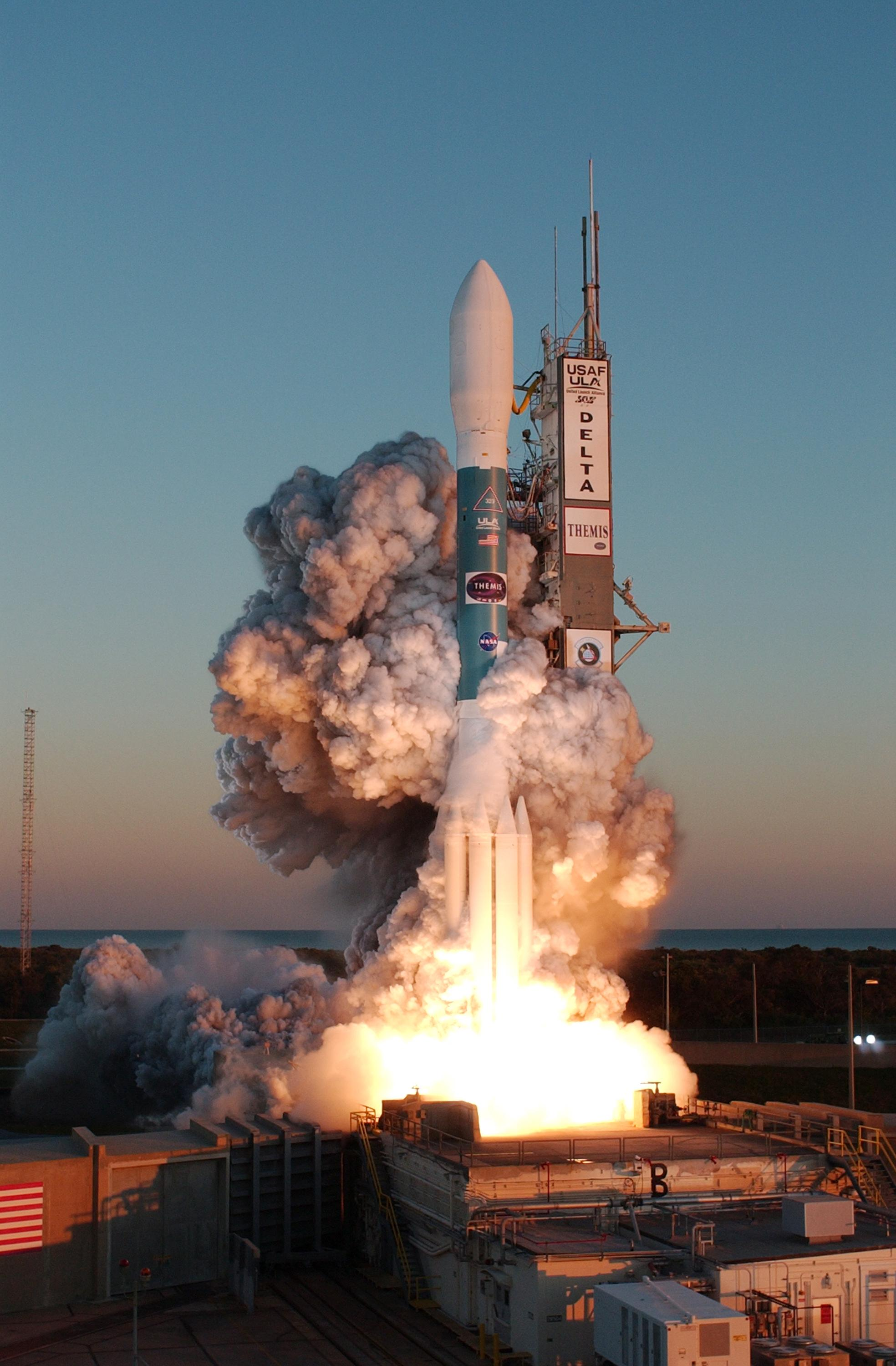
The launch of THEMIS atop the Delta II 7925-10C launch vehicle, at SLC-17B, Cape Canaveral

THEMIS was originally scheduled to launch on 19 October 2006. Owing to delays caused by workmanship problems with Delta II second stages — an issue that also affected the previous mission, STEREO — the THEMIS launch was delayed to 15 February 2007. Due to weather conditions occurring on 13 February 2007, fueling of the second stage was delayed, and the launch pushed back 24 hours. On 16 February 2007, the launch was scrubbed in a hold at the T-4 minute point in the countdown due to the final weather balloon reporting a red, or no-go condition for upper-level winds. A 24-hour turnaround procedure was initiated, targeting a new launch window between 23:01 and 23:17 UTC on 17 February 2007.

Favorable weather conditions were observed on 17 February 2007, and the countdown proceeded smoothly. THEMIS successfully launched at 23:01:00 UTC. The spacecraft separated from the launch vehicle approximately 73 minutes after liftoff. By 03:07 UTC, on 18 February, mission operators at the Space Sciences Laboratory (SSL) of the University of California, Berkeley, commanded and received signals from all five spacecraft, confirming nominal separation status.

The launch service was provided by the United Launch Alliance through the NASA Launch Services Program (LSP).

== FAST ==
The Fast Auroral SnapshoT Explorer (FAST) mission supported THEMIS in 2008 and 2009 before being retired. FAST was a Small Explorer program (SMEX) mission launched in 1996.

== Mission status ==
From 15 February 2007 until 15 September 2007, the five THEMIS satellites coasted in a string-of-pearls orbital configuration. From 15 September until 4 December 2007, the satellites were moved to more distant orbits in preparation for data collection in the magnetotail. This phase of the mission was called the "Dawn Phase" because the satellites' orbits were in apogee on the dawn side of the magnetosphere. On 4 December 2007, the first tail science phase of the mission began. In this segment of the mission scientists will collect data from the magnetotail of the Earth's magnetosphere. During this phase the satellites' orbits are in apogee inside the magnetotail. The scientists hope to observe substorms and magnetic reconnection events. During these events charged particles stored in the Earth's magnetosphere are discharged to form the aurora borealis. Tail science is performed in the winter of the Northern Hemisphere because the ground magnetometers that Themis scientists correlate the satellite data with have relatively longer periods of night. During the night, observations are not interrupted by charged particles from the Sun.

In 2007, THEMIS "found evidence of magnetic ropes connecting Earth's upper atmosphere directly to the Sun", reconfirming the theory of solar-terrestrial electrical interaction (via "Birkeland currents" or "field-aligned currents") proposed by Kristian Birkeland circa 1908. NASA also likened the interaction to a "30 kiloVolt battery in space", noting the "flux rope pumps 650,000 Ampere current into the Arctic!"

On 26 February 2008, THEMIS probes were able to determine, for the first time, the triggering event for the onset of magnetospheric substorms. Two of the five probes, positioned approximately one third the distance to the Moon, measured events suggesting a magnetic reconnection event 96 seconds prior to Auroral intensification. Vassilis Angelopoulos of the University of California, Los Angeles, who is the principal investigator for the THEMIS mission, claimed, "Our data show clearly and for the first time that magnetic reconnection is the trigger".

THEMIS images and multimedia
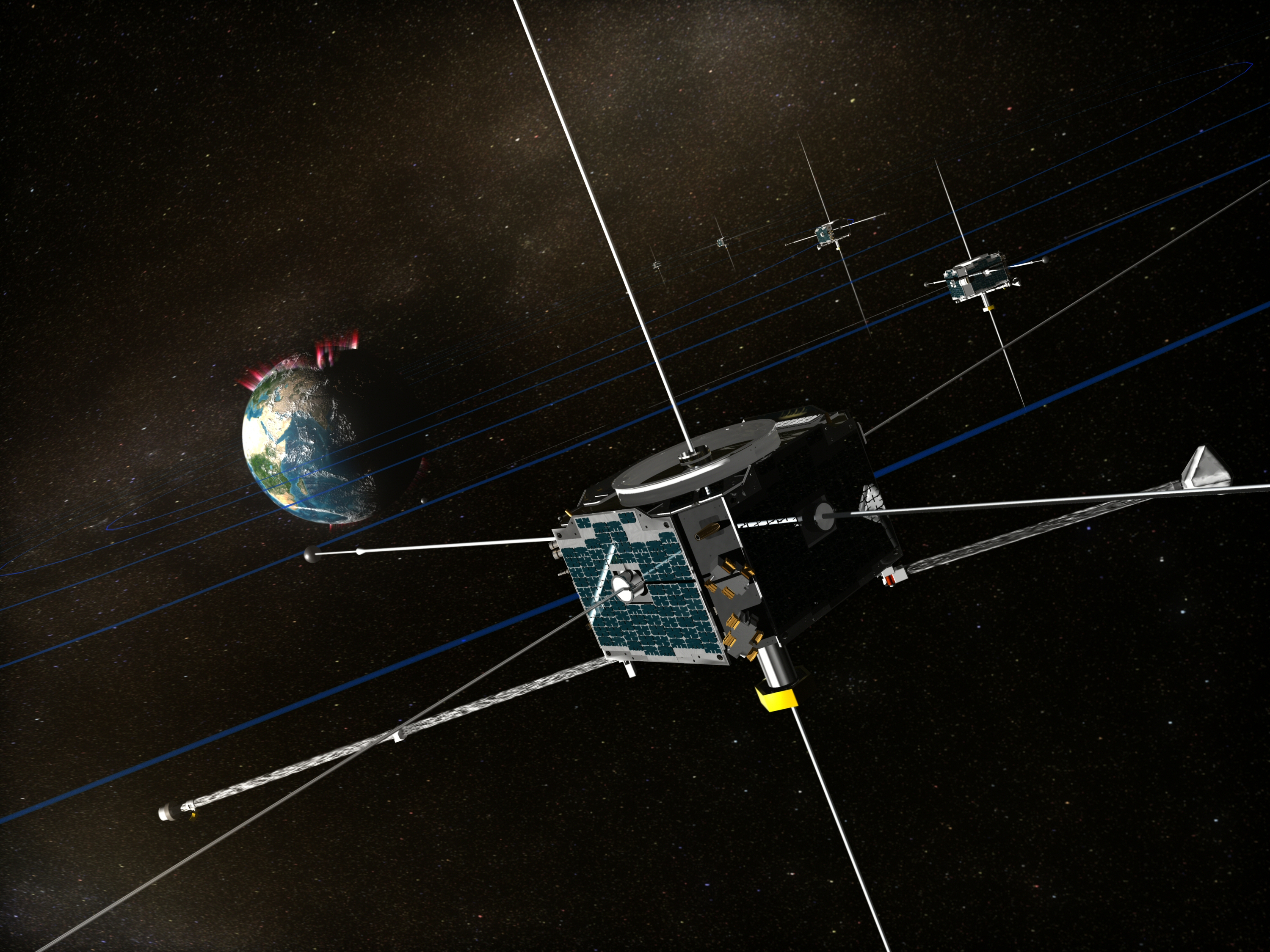
THEMIS in orbit.

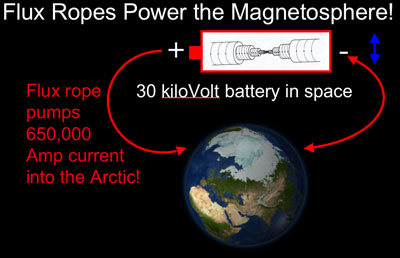
THEMIS discovered a flux rope pumping a 650,000 Amp current into the Arctic.

THEMIS discovered that Earth's magnetic field often develops two holes that allow leaks of solar particles.

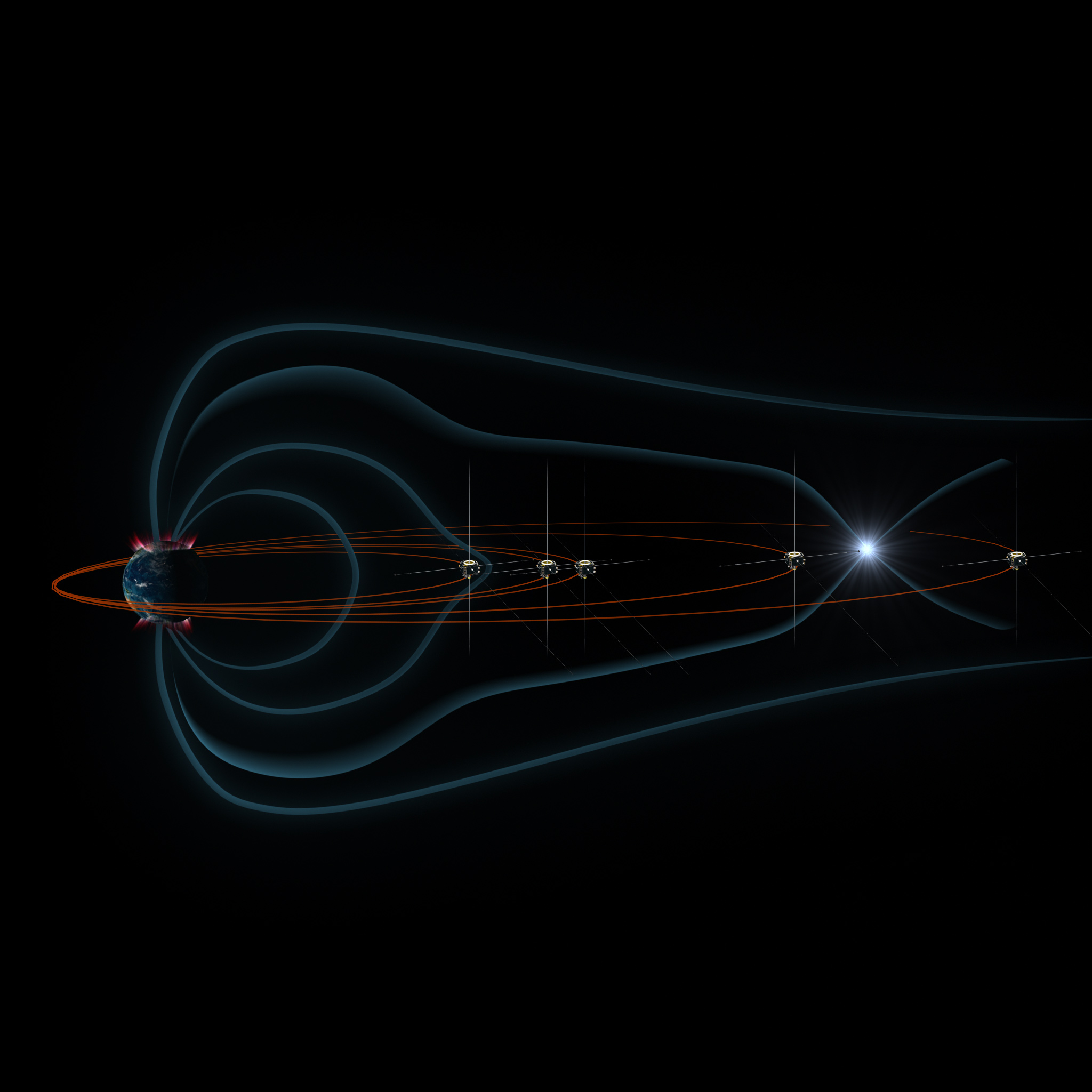
This illustration depicts the individual orbits of NASA's THEMIS spacecraft.

=== Extended mission ===
On 19 May 2008, the Space Sciences Laboratory (SSL) at University of California, Berkeley announced NASA had extended the THEMIS mission to the year 2012. NASA officially approved the movement of THEMIS-B and THEMIS-C into lunar orbit under the mission name "ARTEMIS" (Acceleration, Reconnection, Turbulence and Electrodynamics of the Moon's Interaction with the Sun), which was revised to "THEMIS–ARTEMIS" in 2019. In February 2017, THEMIS celebrated ten years of science operations. As of August 2017, the three THEMIS inner probes continue to collect valuable data on the Sun's interaction with the Earth's magnetosphere.

=== ARTEMIS ===
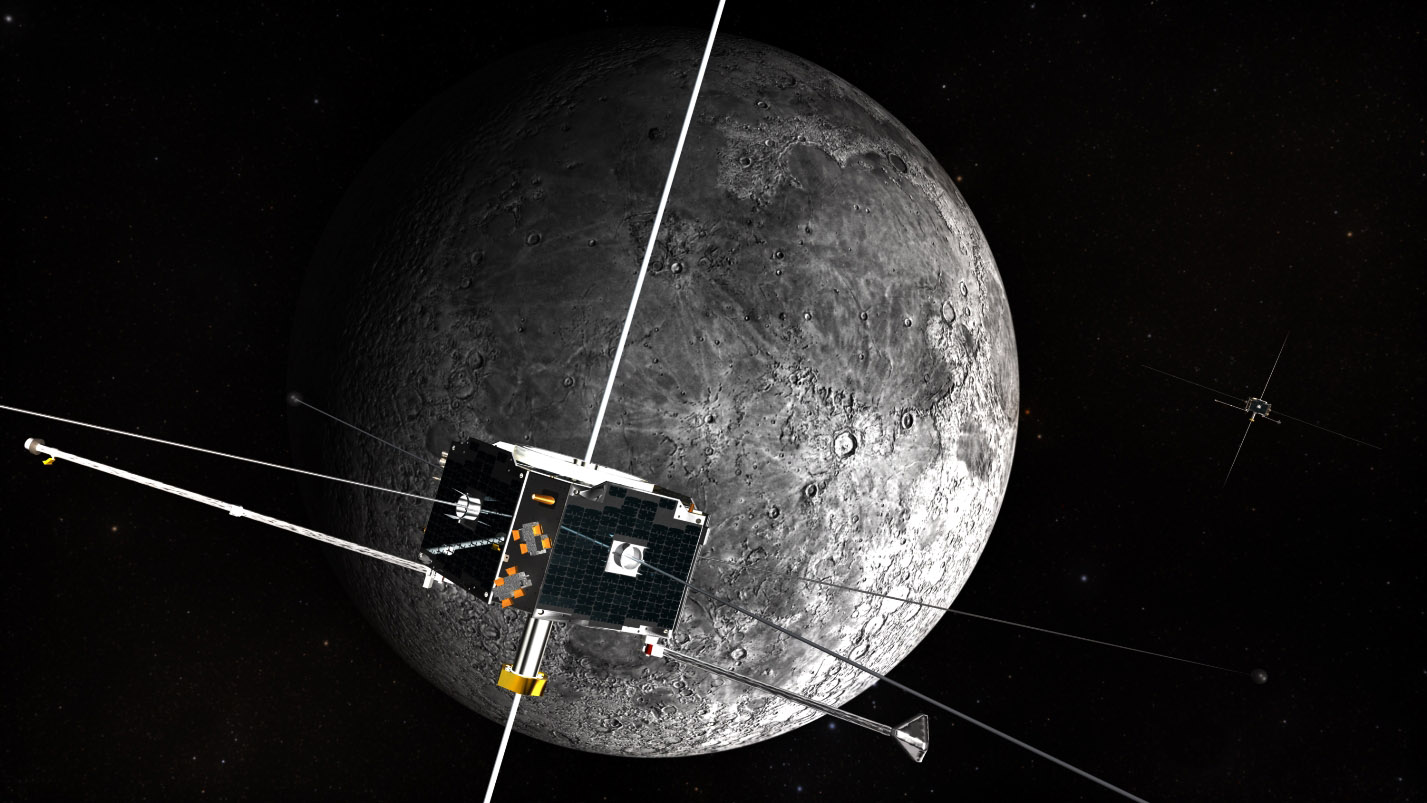
ARTEMIS probes in lunar orbit

In early 2010, ARTEMIS-P1 (THEMIS-B) performed two lunar flybys and one Earth flyby, and approached insertion into a Lissajous orbit around a lunar Lagrange point. Lunar orbit insertion was targeted for April 2011. ARTEMIS-P2 (THEMIS-C) completed a lunar flyby and was on the inbound leg of the first of three deep space excursions on its way to a Lissajous orbit and was targeted for lunar orbit in April 2011.

On 22 June 2011, ARTEMIS-P1 began firing its thrusters to move out of its kidney-shaped libration orbit on one side of the Moon, where it had been since January 2011. On 2 July 2011 at 16:30 UTC, ARTEMIS-P1 entered lunar orbit. The second spacecraft, ARTEMIS-P2, moved into lunar orbit on 17 July 2011. Along the way, the two spacecraft were the first to achieve orbit around the Moon's Lagrange points.

As of October 2019, both lunar probes are in stable orbits, and are expected to remain operational for a long time.

Animation of THEMIS-B

Geocentric orbit phase

Trans-lunar injection phase

Lissajous orbit phase

Selenocentric orbit phase

THEMIS-B · Earth · Moon

== Instruments ==
=== Aboard the spacecraft ===
- Digital Fields Board (DFB): uses a Field-programmable gate array (FPGA) to perform configurable on-board band pass processing and Fast Fourier transform (FFT) on instrument data
- Electric Field Instruments (EFI): is designed and built to sense the electric field in Earth's ever-changing magnetosphere
- Electrostatic Analyzer (ESA): measures thermal electrons and ions to identify and track high-speed flows through the magnetotail and identify pressure pulses
- Fluxgate magnetometer (FGM): measures the background magnetic field to identify and time the abrupt reconfigurations of the magnetosphere during substorm onset, contributed by the German Aerospace Center and the Austrian Space Agency
- Instrument Data Processing Unit (IDPU): houses most of the electronics for the instruments on the THEMIS spacecraft
- Search-coil magnetometer (SCM): measures low frequency magnetic field fluctuations and waves in three directions in Earth's magnetosphere, built by the Centre d'étude des Environnements Terrestres et Planétaire (CETP) and Centre national de la recherche scientifique (CNRS)
- Solid State Telescope (SST): measures energetic particle distribution functions

=== Ground based ===
As the satellites monitor the magnetosphere from orbit, twenty ground stations in North America simultaneously monitor auroras. Ground station mission and science operations are being managed by the University of California's Space Sciences Laboratory.

- Ground-Based All-Sky Imager (ASI) Array: ground-based All-Sky Imager (ASI) array observes the aurora over the Northern American continent from Canada to Alaska in order to determine where and when the auroral substorm onset occurs.
- Ground-Based Magnetometer (GMAG) Array: GMAG Measures changes in Earth's magnetic field near Earth's surface due to substorm onset to help determine the timing of substorm events.

== Research results ==
The THEMIS instruments have been used to track whistler-mode chorus waves during can persist in periods of low geomagnetic activity.

=== Lists of relevant topics ===
- List of active Solar System probes
- List of heliophysics missions
- List of objects at Lagrangian points
- List of Solar System probes
- List of space telescopes
- Timeline of Solar System exploration
- SPEDAS software for space physics data

=== Other relevant spacecraft ===
- Advanced Composition Explorer (ACE), launched in 1997, still operational.
- Cassini–Huygens
- Cluster
- Double Star launched on Cluster.
- Helios
- MESSENGER (MErcury Surface, Space ENvironment, GEochemistry and Ranging), launched in 2004, impacted on Mercury on 30 April 2015.
- Van Allen Probes
- Solar Dynamics Observatory (SDO), launched in 2010, still operational.
- Solar and Heliospheric Observatory (SOHO), launched in 1995, still operational.
- Solar Maximum Mission (SMM), launched in 1980, decommissioned 1989.
- Solar Orbiter (SOLO), launched in 2020.
- Parker Solar Probe, launched in 2018.
- STEREO (Solar TErrestrial RElations Observatory), launched in 2006, still operational.
- Transition Region and Coronal Explorer (TRACE), launched in 1998, decommissioned 2010.
- Ulysses, launched in 1990, decommissioned 2009.
- WIND, launched in 1994, still operational.
- ELFIN (Electron Losses and Fields INvestigation), launched in 2018.

== See also ==
- Explorer program
