= Self-lubricating chain =

Type of chain

Self-lubricating chains, also referred to as lube-free chains, are commonly found in both roller chain (ANSI Standards, British Standards, and DIN Standards) and conveyor chain varieties, with specialty self-lubricating chains also available. These chains utilize a bushing made of an oil-impregnated sintered metal or plastic to provide continuous lubrication to the chain during drive, eliminating the need for further lubrication.

== History ==
While some of the earlier self-lubricating bearings were developed by Chrysler the earliest self-lubricating chains were bushed chains which consisted of pins, plates, and sintered bushings. The loss in strength of the bushing required it to be made extra thick. This made the outer diameter so large that it did not allow enough room for a roller. These bushed chains suffer from the drawback of lower allowable load and tensile strength compared to regular roller chain, and the outer diameter of the bushings do not rotate when engaging a sprocket and may suffer faster wear and damage.

While various chain manufacturers offered self-lubricating bushed chain designs based on sintered-bushing technology since the 1950s, the world's first self-lubricating roller chain was developed and launched by a Japanese chain manufacturer in 1988. After they made further improvements to the oil impregnation and sintering technologies, they received a patent for their lube-free roller chain, as evidenced by Patent #JP20070237969. In the new design, advancements in powder metal bushing technology allowed engineers to design a bush that had a smaller diameter yet was stronger, which allowed room for rollers. These rollers improved performance by allowing the chain to articulate more smoothly into sprockets and protect the sintered bushings. Because of these advancements, the self-lubrication style chains achieved strength on par with regular roller chain, with the added benefit of being lube-free. Powdered metal sintered bearings (in the case of roller chain, the bushings) are self-lubricating because their porosity is impregnated with lubricants during the manufacturing process. In use, frictional heat causes the lubricant to expand and flow out of the pores, forming a film between mating parts. Low coefficients of friction, minimal maintenance and trouble-free service life, low cost, and simple installation are the chief advantages of powdered metal bearings.

== Construction ==
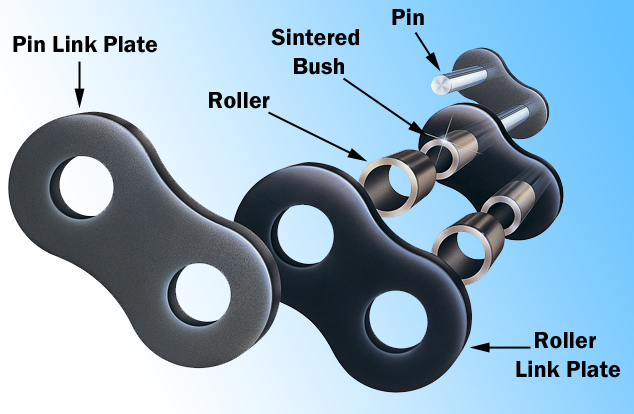
An expanded view of a self-lubricating roller chain link

As with standard roller chains, self-lubricating roller chains consist of five basic parts: inner plates, outer plates, pins, bushings, and rollers. However, the bushings for self-lubricating chains are sintered metal, produced using powder metallurgy. Self-lubricating chains can be manufactured cheaply, quickly, and to precision tolerances. To form the bushings, alloyed powdered metal is mixed, compacted, and sintered. The initial compaction to a large degree dictates the density, shape, dimensions, and mechanical properties of the finished part. Sintered materials have inherent porosity, and the pores have both beneficial and detrimental effects on part performance. The pores act as stress concentration zones and reduce mechanical strength and ductility. However, the pores also reduce noise and vibration and serve as lubricant pockets in lubricated contacts. Sintered bearings and gears are used in many applications where the external lubrication is not possible or not preferred. It is essential that the pores form an interconnected system of controlled size and volume, so that oil is supplied to the entire bearing surface. The rate of oil supply increases with temperature and therefore with increasing speeds of rotation, improving performance.

== Applications ==
Self-lubrication is ideal in situations where normal lubrication is difficult, troublesome, or impossible. For example, in paper and food processing, lubrication is undesirable due to product contamination. (Chain companies like Tsubaki and Renold PLC also offer sintered bushings impregnated with food grade lubricant.)

Self-lubricating bushings are used in conveyor chains as well as roller chains for a variety of conveyance applications. These could include not only RS attachment roller chain, but small size conveyor chains and a wide variety of top chains as well.
