= Swales Aerospace =

Aerospace and defence firm (1978-2007)

Swales & Associates, Inc.
- Industry: Aerospace and Defense
- Founded: April 17, 1978
- Founder: Tom Swales
- Defunct: June 8, 2007
- Fate: Acquired
- Successor: Alliant Techsystems
- Headquarters: Beltsville, Maryland, United States
- Website: www.swales.com

Swales Aerospace was an employee-owned, small business aerospace engineering firm. The company offered a full range of aerospace engineering services. It was the global leader in the development and manufacture of two-phase thermal solutions for spaceflight applications, and it was a small satellite mission provider. In 2007, it was acquired by Alliant Techsystems.

== Key dates ==
- 1978: Swales is formed.
- 1998: Welch Engineering of Pasadena is acquired.
- 2001: Dynatherm is acquired; the El Segundo, California office is opened.
- 2002: The Houston office is opened.
- 2005: Swales is reorganized into four business units.
- 2007: Swales is acquired by Alliant Techsystems

== Company history ==
Swales & Associates, Inc., doing business as Swales Aerospace, was an aerospace engineering firm based in Maryland. It was employee-owned through an ESOP. Swales did some manufacturing of aerospace-related products, specializing in structural and thermal management systems—ways to control movement and heat in satellites. Facilities were located in Virginia, Florida, Texas, California, and Maryland, home of the Goddard Space Flight Center. NASA accounted for about 75 percent of business. The U.S. Department of Defense was another key customer. The company participated in programs such as the Hubble Space Telescope and the International Space Station and had begun producing its own small satellites before being acquired by Alliant Techsystems in 2007.

=== Beltsville origins ===
Swales was established in Beltsville, Maryland, on April 17, 1978. Company founder Tom Swales was the first president and CEO. Future CEO Tom Wilson was director of business development. Both Swales and Wilson had structural analysis engineering backgrounds. Ron Luzier, originally senior vice-president and chief engineer, and later chief technology officer, joined Swales and Wilson in founding the company.

The company began with ten employees overall and originally worked from an office at NASA's Goddard Space Flight Center, where it provided analysis for the Hubble Space Telescope. After occupying space at the Maryland Federal Savings and Loan Building and the Nationwide Insurance Building in Greenbelt, Maryland, in 1985 Swales moved into a half-floor suite in the Paulen Industrial Center. It eventually expanded into 18 buildings at the site.

=== Acquisition drive beginning in 1995 ===
Swales set out on an acquisition drive in 1995. Around the same time, it ventured from pure engineering to manufacturing satellite hardware and tools for astronauts, such as a popular power wrench. Revenues exceeded $75 million in 1997. Swales then had 700 employees and was growing quickly. Among other projects, the company was manufacturing components for the International Space Station's thermal control system.

Welch Engineering Ltd. of Pasadena, California, was acquired in December 1998. Welch strengthened Swales's control systems offerings, Tom Wilson told the Washington Business Journal. The Pasadena location was convenient to the Jet Propulsion Laboratory. Welch also had an office in Rockville, Maryland, and about 40 employees.

NASA accounted for 70 percent of business. In the late 1990s Swales designed an instrument package for NASA's Far Ultraviolet Spectroscopic Explorer (FUSE). FUSE sought to probe wavelengths that had not yet been observed in a quest to help understand the origins of the universe. Jim Pontius, lead structural engineer, pioneered many advancements in low-temperature composites and bonds to facilitate the mission. According to Space Business News, Swales was transferring technology from the FUSE project to the Naval EarthMap Observer (NEMO) remote sensing-satellite.

A team led by Swales was awarded the rights to commercialize NASA's Small Explorer-Lite (SMEX-Lite) spacecraft technology in 1999. AlliedSignal Technical Services Corp. and Hammers Co. were partners in the venture. Swales was prime contractor on Earth Observing 1 (EO1), a small satellite launched in November 2000. Swales was also one of three companies NASA chose in 2000 to develop lightweight spacecraft, new conductivity materials, and other technologies.

=== Big contracts in 2000 ===
Sales were $90 million in 2000. The company had never had an annual loss, Wilson told the Washington Post, because it kept to its engineering niche. Employment hovered at around 800 people. In November of that year, Swales wrested a five-year, $240 million NASA contract from its much larger local rival Federal Data Corp. (later acquired by Northrop Grumman). This contract related to NASA's Langley Research Center. It was soon followed up with a $350 million deal supporting the Goddard Space Flight Center for five years. In both cases, Swales led a team of subcontractors.

NASA accounted for most of the company's revenues. After the September 11, 2001 terrorist attacks against the United States, updating aging defense satellites became a national priority. Defense-related work was soon accounting for about 10 percent of revenues.

In October 2001 Swales acquired most of the assets of Dynatherm, a Hunt Valley, Maryland developer of thermal management systems, from Pressure Systems Inc. of California, which had bought the company three years earlier. Around the same time as the Dynatherm purchase, Swales opened an office in El Segundo, California, to be more accessible to the commercial aerospace industry near Los Angeles. The company also had a new engineering center on Merritt Island, Florida, near Cape Canaveral and the John F. Kennedy Space Center.

Swales opened an office near Houston's Johnson Space Center in early 2002. The company's Beltsville, Maryland site was expanded later in the year with the addition of a 34,000-square-foot office and production facility, bringing its total space there to more than 220,000 square feet. Revenues were $157 million for 2002.

NASA was farming out more of its engineering work in order to reduce its staffing levels, noted the Daily Press of Newport News, Virginia. Swales was one of the three largest contractors for NASA's Langley, Virginia facility. Still, with about 900 employees (125 of them at Langley, according to the Daily Press), it was not too large to compete as a small business, which conveyed certain advantages in the bidding process. In 2002, Swales took over the lead contractor position in a $225 million, five-year contract to provide NASA Langley with Systems Analysis and Mission Support (SAMS), displacing previous agreements held by giant Lockheed Martin and Federal Data Corp.

Among the company's high-tech projects was computer simulation work for a powerful hypersonic aircraft engine. Swales was also a partner on a Boeing-led team contracted by NASA to develop nuclear electric power systems deep space exploration. These used electric thrusters powered by nuclear reactors.

The company continued to support the Hubble Space Telescope by participating in repair missions. Swales designed more efficient solar arrays for the Hubble and developed a cooling system for the Hubble's Near Infrared Camera and Multi-Object Spectrometer (NICMOS).

=== A new drill in 2002 ===
Swales seemed likely to benefit from President George W. Bush's proposal to put an American on Mars. One relevant technology being tested was a low-energy dry drilling instrument designed to probe for water under the Martian surface. In a 2002 field test, the device drilled ten meters into Arizona sandstone without requiring repairs or a bit change. After slipping $4 million to $140 million in 2002, revenues rose to $157 million in 2003.

An important new product was the SCONCE secondary carrier. It allowed small payloads to share a launch with larger ones. SCONCE successfully launched an experimental micro-satellite from an Air Force rocket in May 2003. Its cost savings suggested commercial potential.

Aavid Thermalloy, LLC joined Swales in an alliance to commercialize advanced electronic cooling systems that Swales had developed in thermal management work for government satellite programs. Aavid, the world leader in thermal management for electronics, brought high-volume manufacturing capacity and global marketing connections to the partnership. Wilson told the Washington Post that as computer chips became faster and hotter, they could benefit from the heat pipes the company had developed to regulate the temperatures of satellite components.

Swales was named the primary mission assurance director for the U.S. Department of Defense's Missile Defense Agency in September 2004. Swales was supported by a team including Millennium Engineering and Integration Company and subcontractors SRS Technologies and Vanguard Research Inc. The Missile Defense Agency's main role was to develop the Ballistic Missile Defense System.

Sales were expected to exceed $180 million in 2004, when Swales employed 900 people. Expanding the company's customer base was a priority.

Swales was reorganized into four business units effective January 2005. Civil Services included engineering support for NASA customers such as Goddard Space Flight Center, Langley Research Center, the Jet Propulsion Laboratory, and the Johnson Space Center. Commercial Programs and Engineering Services was in charge of supplying commercial space programs with flight hardware and thermal management systems.

Swales also was participating in a space weather program called THEMIS, scheduled for launch in October 2006. THEMIS (Time History of Events and Macroscale Interactions During Substorms) was designed to track disturbances in the Earth's magnetosphere using five satellites.

== Principal operating units ==
- Civil Programs
- Civil Services
- Commercial Programs and Engineering Services
- National Security Programs and Engineering Services.
