= Chanes =

Chanes may refer to:

- Chanés, an ethnic group of South America
- Chânes, a commune in eastern France
- Galileo Chanes, Uruguayan footballer

== See also ==
- Channes, a commune in north-central France
- Chane (disambiguation)
