= What Looks Like Crazy on an Ordinary Day =

1997 debut novel by Pearl Cleage

- Author: Pearl Cleage
- Language: English
- Publisher: Avon
- Publication date: December 1, 1997
- Publication place: United States
- Media type: Print (hardback and paperback)
- Pages: 224 pp (first edition hardcover)
- ISBN: 0-380-97584-X (first edition hardcover)
- OCLC: 37024133
- Dewey Decimal: 813/.54 21
- LC Class: PS3553.L389 W48 1997

What Looks Like Crazy on an Ordinary Day is the 1997 debut novel by Pearl Cleage. It was published by Avon on December 1, 1997, and was selected for the Oprah Winfrey Book Club in 1998 and was a New York Times Best Seller for nine straight weeks. What Looks Like Crazy on an Ordinary Day marks Pearl Cleage's first published novel and it is followed by the 2001 novel I Wish I Had a Red Dress. The novel depicts the life of a young African-American woman named Ava Johnson in the following months after being diagnosed with HIV; in addition to the realities of living with a retrovirus, Cleage's work addresses issues involving race, sexuality, gender, class, and ability in American society.

== Plot summary ==
The novel is separated into five parts: June, July, August, September, and November.

=== June ===
Ava Johnson, a young black woman living in Atlanta, is diagnosed with HIV which she contracted from an unknown source through sexual intercourse. Upon her HIV-positive diagnosis, she is alienated by her community in Atlanta and loses her clients at her hair salon on the basis of people's fear of the virus and their association of it with AIDS. Ava decides to move to Idlewild, Michigan, her hometown, to live with her widowed sister Joyce before fulfilling her dream to start a new life in San Francisco, California. When Ava arrives at the Grand Rapids airport, Joyce's close friend Eddie Jefferson comes to pick her up because Joyce is busy taking care of a young woman in labor. At Ava's request, Eddie and Ava stop at a liquor store on the way home from the airport. While in the parking lot of the liquor store, Eddie and Ava witness a violent dispute between a young man, Frank, and his girlfriend who have a young son together. Eddie manages to deescalate the fight by punching Frank in the Adam's apple, a skill which is revealed he learned from serving in the Army. After witnessing the fight and dropping the woman and the baby back off at their house, Eddie reveals to Ava that there is a budding crack problem within Idlewild. Once Ava and Eddie arrive at Joyce's house, Ava discovers that Joyce redecorated the entire house with shades of blue because of a magazine article she read that claimed it was a healing color. Once Joyce returns home, she tells Ava that the woman she was assisting in labor was a crack addict and that the baby will be tested for HIV. The following day, Ava and Joyce, find out that the baby tested negative for HIV; however, the mother left the hospital without the baby. Since the baby is orphaned, Joyce decides that she wants to personally care for the baby; upon making this decision, her and Ava head to Mattie's house, the aunt of the baby, to receive permission. Once the two reach the house, they are met by siblings Mattie and Frank, who tell Joyce that they do not wish to keep the baby. Joyce decides that she wants to find the baby a temporary home; in the meantime, the baby is taken back to the hospital. Joyce reveals to Ava that she leads a group of young teenage mothers at the local church in a weekly group meeting called the Sewing Circus. While the group was initially formed in order to offer Sunday morning nursery care for the mothers, the group evolved into being a group discussion of any issue the girls are struggling with in their daily lives. As a social worker, Joyce uses the Sewing Circus as an opportunity to empower and especially educate young women. While the group is a positive outlet for young women in the community, the topics discussed in the group, such as birth control, do not sit well with the Reverend and the Reverend's wife, Gerry Anderson. The hospital decides that Joyce is allowed to take temporary custody of the baby; once Joyce brings the baby home, she decides to name the baby Imani meaning "faith" in Swahili. Eddie and Ava continue to deepen their friendship; however, Ava fears that any sort of romantic relationship is off-limits due to her HIV-positive diagnosis.

=== July ===
Come July, Joyce is met with the news from Gerry Anderson that the Sewing Circus is not allowed to meet at the Church anymore because it does not align with their conservative values. Although upset by Gerry and the Reverend's decision, Joyce is unsurprised by its removal from the Church grounds. When Ava goes to the town pharmacy to pick-up her HIV medication, she finds out that the pharmacist revealed her diagnosis to some members of the town including Gerry. In turn, Ava is faced with ridicule and judgement from some of the community upon the news from the pharmacist. In response to the banning of the Sewing Circus from the Church, Joyce holds the meeting at her house and the turn-out is higher than it ever was at the Church leading Joyce to the idea that the group will need a larger meeting space. Later that night, Ava goes to Eddie's house where he tells her about his past serving in the army in Vietnam. The following night, Ava and Eddie begin to watch Menace II Society together until Eddie decides that he cannot watch it anymore; upon telling Ava this, he reveals to her his violent past involving drugs and a ten year sentence to prison for murder. While shaken up by the news of Eddie's past, she maintains her relationship with him and decides to reveal her HIV-positive diagnosis to him a few nights later. Eddie is accepting of Ava's diagnosis and the two begin a romantic relationship together; however, they must take certain precautions during sex to protect Eddie from contracting HIV.

=== August ===
With the news that an old man in Idlewild is putting his house up for sale for ten thousand dollars cash, Eddie proposes that the house would be a good relocation for the Sewing Circus meetings. From money she saved up at the salon, Ava pays for the house and her Joyce and Eddie begin renovations. However, Joyce receives a letter from the state government that the Sewing Circus will no longer receive funding. The state's decision to discontinue funding resulted from a letter Gerry Anderson sent the government with false information about the Sewing Circus. While Joyce heads to defend the right to funding for the Sewing Circus, Ava cares for Imani. One night while Joyce is away, Ava witnesses Frank and Tyrone pull into Joyce's driveway and have sex with Frank's girlfriend on top of the car. Before they drive away, Frank throws a beer bottle at Joyce's house, shattering her window. Although Eddie wants to put Frank and Tyrone in their place, Ava urges him to not do anything drastic. After Ava and Eddie file a complaint at the sheriff's office, Tyrone and Frank tell the sheriff that Ava intentionally tried to seduce them; the sheriff does not believe Ava's story. In an effort to resolve the issues between Joyce and the Anderson's, Ava and Joyce go to the Anderson's house to talk about their issues with the Sewing Circus; however, Ava and Joyce are only met by the Reverend who is unable to have a proper discussion due to his drunkenness. While painting the new house for the Sewing Circus, Eddie proposes to Ava unto which Ava decides to take a few days to process this possibility of a new life. When Mattie arrives to Joyce's house with a social worker, Joyce reluctantly agrees to give Imani back to Mattie for the weekend prior to a hearing on the following Monday to determine Imani's official home.

=== September ===
While Imani is at Mattie's house for the weekend, Joyce convinces Ava to go with her to the house in case there are signs that Imani is in trouble. After hearing Imani's screams from outside the house, Ava and Joyce break in to find out that Frank twisted Imani's legs and broke them. After being rushed to the hospital, Imani's legs are put into casts and the doctors assure Joyce and Ava that she will be okay. Upon meeting a woman who was a member of the Anderson's old Church in Chicago, Ava finds out that Reverend Anderson fled the city after allegations of sexual interactions with young boys of the parish arose. With this information, Ava confronts Gerry Anderson and threatens to publicize the allegations in Idlewild; with this threat, both Gerry and the Reverend leave town.

=== November/Epilogue ===
In the epilogue, Ava reveals that Imani's casts were removed and she's doing well. Frank and Mattie finally get caught by the police after committing several drug-related robberies. Since the Anderson's left town, the church inducts a new pastor, Sister Judith, who is received well by the community. With Sister Judith officiating, Eddie and Ava get married.

== Setting ==
The majority of the plot takes place in Idlewild, Michigan during the 1990s. The novel features social issues that were consistent with the time period and the type of story; these issues include violence, drug abuse, sexual abuse, teenage pregnancy, and an increased lack of access to education.

== Characters ==
- Ava Johnson: Ava Johnson is the main protagonist of the novel. After her diagnosis with HIV, she makes the decision to move from Atlanta back to her hometown of Idlewild, Michigan to live with her sister Joyce for the summer.
- Joyce Mitchell: Joyce Mitchell is the older sister of Ava Johnson. She works as a state caseworker and runs a woman's group for teenage mothers called the "Sewing Circus" with the purpose of group support and education. Joyce becomes a widow two years prior to the beginning of the plot of the novel after her husband drowned.
- Mitch Mitchell: Mitch is the late husband of Joyce Mitchell. After 23 years of marriage to Joyce, he slipped and drowned into a lake covered with a thin sheet of ice by their house in Michigan.
- Eddie Jefferson: Eddie Jefferson is a close friend of Joyce who forms a romantic relationship with Ava. He is an army veteran and a convicted felon who served 10 years in prison on a murder charge.
- Eartha: Eartha is the mother of Imani. After Joyce assists her in labor at the hospital, she abandons the baby.
- Gerry Anderson: Gerry Anderson is the Reverend's wife. Under her leadership in the church, she disapproves of the Sewing Circus in favor of a more conservative education for young women.
- Reverend Anderson: At the head of the church in Idlewild, the Reverend enforces conservative values.
- Imani: Imani is the "crack baby" which Joyce and Ava take custody of after her mother leaves her in the hospital. The name, Imani, is Swahili for "faith".
- Frank: Frank is a troubled teenager in Idlewild and the brother of Mattie.
- Tyrone: Tyrone is another troubled teenager of Idlewild who is a close friend of Frank.
- Aretha: Aretha is a member of the Sewing Circus; however, she is the only one without a baby. Through the help of Joyce, Ava, and the education and support she receives from the Sewing Circus, she receives a spot in an arts school summer program at Interlochen with all expenses paid.

== Reception ==
Author Bryan Aubrey has noted that the novel showcases the empowerment of women in the face of undeniably difficult life challenges and that Cleage's focus on the challenges associated with AIDS, drug addiction, and domestic violence offer an intuitive look into the realities of social issues that are dealt with at surface level by traditional societal institutions. He has further noted that it could be seen as a self-help book as it depicts Ava steadily making positive life changes in her diet, exercise, spiritual presence, and substance use. Frances Henderson in turn felt that Cleage's portrayal of Ava taking part in a reverse migration, returning to one's homestead, had a connection to longstanding traditions in African American Literature of characters returning to their roots in order to sort out the challenges in their lives.

Concerning Cleage's discussion of gender relations, Barbara Valle has highlighted the portrayal of "cosmic confusion" between men and women In the same vein, Loverlie and Erin King interpret the novel as a "healing romance" because of its insistence on the idea that the healing of the challenges faced by African-American people require the cooperation of both men and women.

Authors, Erin King and Lovalerie King, praised Cleage's work for depicting a story about HIV/AIDS in a humorous way.

Timothy Lyle commends Cleage's work for bringing awareness to HIV positive African-American women.

In a feature in "Voice from the Gaps" at University of Minnesota, Cleage's work is praised for depicting an alternative representation of motherhood and the struggles that come along with it.

The novel received some critical response by Bryan Aubrey on the basis of Ava's character transitioning from an outspoken, unpredictable character to one who makes predictable decisions based on political and spiritual correctness. Aubrey compares the representation of Ava's newfound happiness in life to the ideology of magazines like Cosmopolitan and Glamour which assert that people's lives will drastically improve once they start performing "anti-stress" activities.

The novel has been critically compared to Animal Dreams (1990) for characterizing a male protagonist as having very little flaws. Aubrey Bryan argues that the portrayal of Eddie Jefferson as a near perfect individual lends the novel to be more instructional rather than realistic with multi-dimensional characters.

Timothy Lyle critiques the novel's reliance on responding to adverse life situations with the response of heteronormative practices, "gender compliance", and "able-bodied productivity". Lyle also argues that Cleage's work reinforces problematic interpretations of blackness which set rigid expectations for what blackness is and what it is not; Lyle argues that Cleage controversially asserts that Ava's character, an HIV positive black woman, must show "signs of potential rehabilitation" and maintain a likable personality in order to regain acceptance in the black community.

== Themes ==
=== Coming-home ===
The novel closely associates rehabilitation with the idea of "coming-home" to one's place of origin in order to find love, community, and purpose amidst a threatening life situation.

=== Adversity ===
The novel emphasizes finding happiness in the face of adversity. With Joyce experiencing the loss of a husband, Ava receiving an HIV positive diagnosis, Eartha's loss of both her parents, and Eddie's struggle with violence and PTSD, the novel works to depict characters finding purpose and happiness in the face of adverse life situations. In order to find happiness in light of these situations, Cleage implies the importance of the use of "spiritual practices" in order to reform one's personal issues into acceptance and find peace in the practice of compassion for others.

== Depiction of HIV/AIDS ==
Cleage's portrayal of Ava's HIV diagnosis as well as its inclusion of sex-education has received some criticism for its inaccurate depiction of the realities of the disease as well as the logistics of preventing its contraction in HIV-discordant relationships, which are relationships where one partner is HIV-positive and one is not.

In an analysis of Cleage's work, Timothy Lyle proposes that Cleage takes part in cultural sanitizing, a practice in which an author problematically molds a taboo subject into a socially acceptable narrative. Lyle attributes the success of the novel to Cleage's depiction of a heterosexual African-American with HIV into a pleasurable narrative in which Ava's "threatening" diagnosis is ultimately accepted back into able-bodied heteronormativity. Cleage's depiction of an HIV inflicted African-American is criticized by Lyle as it alludes to the idea that an HIV inflicted individual must "soap up" and "scrub down" in order to regain acceptance in general society.

Ayana Weekley argues that respectability politics, the phenomenon of dominant figures in marginalized groups aligning their values with the dominant values of the majority, mold the discourse of race, gender, and sexuality in relation to the interrogation of the HIV/AIDs epidemic in Cleage's work.
