= Chain sequence =

In the analytic theory of continued fractions, a chain sequence is an infinite sequence {a_{n}} of non-negative real numbers chained together with another sequence {g_{n}} of non-negative real numbers by the equations,

$$a_1 = (1-g_0)g_1 \quad a_2 = (1-g_1)g_2 \quad a_n = (1-g_{n-1})g_n$$

where either (a) 0 ≤ g_{n} < 1, or (b) 0 < g_{n} ≤ 1. Chain sequences arise in the study of the convergence problem – both in connection with the parabola theorem, and also as part of the theory of positive definite continued fractions.

The infinite continued fraction of Worpitzky's theorem contains a chain sequence. A closely related theorem shows that,

$$f(z) = \cfrac{a_1z}{1 + \cfrac{a_2z}{1 + \cfrac{a_3z}{1 + \cfrac{a_4z}{\ddots}}}} \,$$

converges uniformly on the closed unit disk |z| ≤ 1 if the coefficients {a_{n}} are a chain sequence.

== An example ==
The sequence {1/4, 1/4, 1/4, ...} appears as a limiting case in the statement of Worpitzky's theorem. Since this sequence is generated by setting g_{0} = g_{1} = g_{2} = ... = 1/2, it is clearly a chain sequence. This sequence has two important properties.

- Since f(x) = x − x^{2} is a maximum when x = 1/2, this example is the "biggest" chain sequence that can be generated with a single generating element; or, more precisely, if {g_{n}} = {x}, and x < 1/2, the resulting sequence {a_{n}} will be an endless repetition of a real number y that is less than 1/4.
- The choice g_{n} = 1/2 is not the only set of generators for this particular chain sequence. Notice that setting
  $$g_0 = 0 \quad g_1 = {\textstyle\frac{1}{4}} \quad g_2 = {\textstyle\frac{1}{3}} \quad
g_3 = {\textstyle\frac{3}{8}} \;\dots$$
  generates the same unending sequence {1/4, 1/4, 1/4, ...}.
