= Chain (play) =

1992 play by Pearl Cleage

Chain is an American solo performance play by Pearl Cleage. It tells the story of a 16-year-old Rosa, an African American teenager addicted to crack who has been chained to a radiator in her family home as an intervention attempt. Chain debuted in 1992 at the Women's Project in New York, starring Karen Malina White.

== Plot ==
"The action revolves around the character Rosa Jackson, a sixteen-year-old drug addict whose parents have chained her to the radiator in their Harlem apartment in an attempt to save her from herself. As the drama unfolds, Rosa reflects on how she became an addict and struggles to choose between a life with drugs or a life without them."

== Productions ==
Chain debuted at the Women's Project in New York City in 1992, starring Karen Malina White as Rosa. It was released on a double-bill with another one-act play by Cleage, Late Bus to Mecca.

The play has been staged in cities including Washington, D.C. (2002), Kalamazoo, Michigan (2015), and Houston, Texas (2018).

== Background ==
Chain was commissioned and developed by Cleage with the Women's Project and the Southeast Playwrights Project of Atlanta. She also co-produced Chain with the Women's Project and the New Federal Theatre at Judith Anderson Theatre in New York City.

She wrote Chain as a solo performance play, and similar to her other works, the subject matter was inspired by real-life events. She read an article in the New York Times about a Puerto Rican mother and father who chained their teenage daughter to the radiator as a last resort to disrupt her drug addiction. Cleage's play centered the story on a Black family from Alabama that moves to Harlem. She described it as an exploration of the vulnerability of African American girls and their struggle with the cultural mandate to adopt their foremothers' values.

The play employs unconventional devices such as the protagonist breaking the fourth wall and the use of projected text to mark the beginning of each of seven scenes.

== Reception ==
Carl A. Rossi of The Theatre Mirror reviewed the play positively, "This is a tough, tough play, and a tragic one...But CHAIN is never depressing; it is wonderfully leavened by Rosa’s equally tough sense of humor...and she betrays a still-good, still-innocent quality that soon has you rooting for her."

Dolores Whiskeyman praised Cleage's writing in The Washington Post, "She writes without sentimentality, and her stroke of genius is to deliver the situation entirely from Rosa's point of view. It's a valuable perspective, underscoring the immensity of a social ill far too complex to be resolved with bumper-sticker slogans and 30-second TV spots."
