= ELFIN =

University of California, Los Angeles developed cubesats

Electron Losses and Fields Investigation (ELFIN) is a nanosatellite developed by University of California, Los Angeles (UCLA). ELFIN is a 3U+ CubeSat designed to study space weather, specifically, the loss of relativistic electrons in the radiation belts. ELFIN was a participant in the Air Force Research Lab's University Nanosatellite Program and is currently funded by NASA's Low Cost Access to Space program and the National Science Foundation.

ELFIN carries a fluxgate magnetometer as well as two energetic particle detectors: one for ions and one for electrons and aims to understand the loss mechanisms of relativistic "killer" electrons by providing pitch angle resolved energetic particle measurements. The principal investigator of the project is Vassilis Angelopoulos.

== Launch ==
ELFIN and ELFIN* are part of NASA's ELaNa-18. ELFIN launched with ICESat-2 in September 2018 from Vandenberg Air Force Base. They are tracked with NORAD ID of 43617 (ELFIN A) and 43616 (ELFIN B).

== ELFIN-L ==
ELFIN-L is a collaboration mission between UCLA and Moscow State University. The Institute of Geophysics and Planetary Physics (IGPP) at UCLA delivered the ELFIN instruments for the Mikhailo Lomonosov Russian University Satellite. The satellite launched on 28 April 2016.

== ELFIN-STAR ==
Electron Losses and Fields Investigation with Spatio Temporal Ambiguity Resolution (ELFIN-STAR or ELFIN*) option was awarded and executed in November 2017, which adds an identical CubeSat to the launch. This allows two measurements to be made over the same location in orbit which can determine if electron loss mechanisms are varying spatially or temporally. The satellites, ELFIN-A and ELFIN-B launched on 15 September 2018.
