= Chain of thought =

Chain of thought might refer to:

- A train of thought
- The text generated by reasoning models before producing an answer
- Chain-of-thought prompting, a technique in natural language processing
