= Earth Observing-1 =

NASA Earth Observation Satellite (2000-2017)

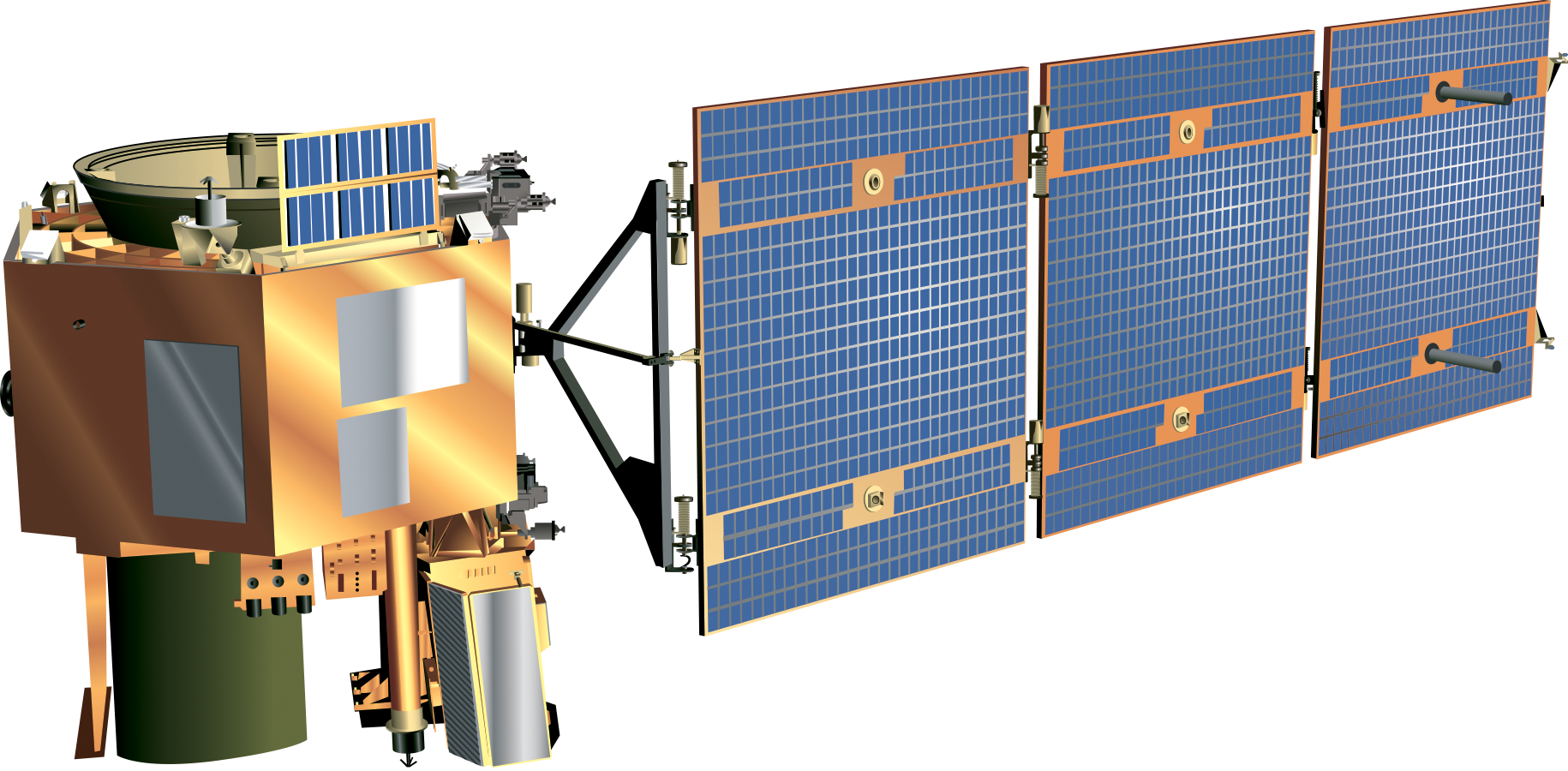
- Mission type: Earth observation
- Operator: NASA / GSFC
- COSPAR ID: 2000-075A
- SATCAT no.: 26619
- Website: eo1.gsfc.nasa.gov
- Mission duration: Planned: 1 year Final: 16 years, 4 months, 8 days

Spacecraft properties
- Manufacturer: Swales Aerospace; Northrop Grumman
- Launch mass: 573 kg (1,263 lb)

Start of mission
- Launch date: 21 November 2000, 18:24:25 UTC
- Rocket: Delta II 7320-10C, D282
- Launch site: Vandenberg SLC-2W

End of mission
- Disposal: Decommissioned
- Deactivated: 30 March 2017
- Decay date: 2056 (planned)

Orbital parameters
- Reference system: Geocentric
- Regime: Sun-synchronous
- Semi-major axis: 7,058 km (4,386 mi)
- Eccentricity: 0.00071
- Perigee altitude: 690 km (430 mi)
- Apogee altitude: 700 km (430 mi)
- Inclination: 98.21 degrees
- Period: 98.7 minutes
- Epoch: 21 November 2000, 08:24:00 UTC

Instruments
- Advanced Land Imager (ALI); Hyperspectral Imager (Hyperion); Atmospheric Corrector

Earth Observing-1 (EO-1) was a NASA Earth observation satellite created to develop and validate a number of instrument and spacecraft bus breakthrough technologies. It was intended to enable the development of future Earth imaging observatories that will have a significant increase in performance while also having reduced cost and mass. The spacecraft was part of the New Millennium Program. It was the first satellite to map active lava flows from space; the first to measure a facility's methane leak from space; and the first to track re-growth in a partially logged Amazon forest from space. EO-1 captured scenes such as the ash after the World Trade Center attacks, the flooding in New Orleans after Hurricane Katrina, volcanic eruptions and a large methane leak in southern California.

== Overview ==
Its Advanced Land Imager (ALI) measured nine different wavelengths simultaneously, instead of the seven measured by the imager in Landsat 7. This permitted a greater flexibility in false-color imagery. Another improvement was that instead of having an imaging spectrometer that sweeps from side to side, the ALI had a linear array of spectrometers that each scanned a strip of ground parallel to that of adjacent spectrometers. In order to compare the two imagers, EO-1 followed Landsat 7 in its orbit by exactly one minute. The ALI's instrument design and onboard technology directly shaped the design of the Operational Land Imager (OLI) on Landsat 8.

Other new technologies included:

- Hyperion imaging spectrometer recording more than 200 wavelengths;
- phased array communications antenna;
- optical fiber cables connected the data logger with the two IBM RAD6000s;
- teflon-fueled pulsed plasma thruster;
- lightweight, flexible solar panel;
- carbon-coated radiators for thermal control;
- Linear Etalon Imaging Spectrometer Array equipped with a new atmospheric correction device.

EO-1 was also used to test new software, like the Autonomous Sciencecraft Experiment. This allowed the spacecraft to decide for itself how best to create a desired image. It was only limited by a priority list of different types of images, and by forecasts of cloud cover provided by the NOAA.

The knowledge acquired and technology developed from Hyperion is being incorporated into a NASA concept for a potential future hyperspectral satellite, the Hyperspectral Infrared Imager.

It was expected to function for twelve months and was designed to function for eighteen months. Those expectations were greatly exceeded, though its hydrazine fuel was mostly depleted by February 2011. Small maneuvers were successful for debris avoidance but long duration burns for orbit maintenance could not be performed due to insufficient fuel.

The 2013 Senior Review Panel recommended that EO-1 be decommissioned in 2015, when the Mean Local Time (MLT) equatorial crossing would "have degraded to the point where many products will lose their usefulness." The EO-1 team proposed that the mission continue as a "lunar lab". They proposed that by turning the instruments toward the moon and spectrally characterizing selected lunar features at a variety of lunar phase angles, they could facilitate cross-calibration among imaging satellites. For example: if EO-1 Lunar Lab were to be in operation to overlap CLARREO Pathfinder in 2019, the coincident lunar measurements would allow the entire EO-1 ALI and Hyperion archive to be put on the CLARREO radiometric scale, along with the other sensors that have and will image the moon. In 2015, the Senior Review Panel stated that they could not support this justification for the extended mission beyond 2016 and recommended that it be decommissioned on 30 September 2016, when an analysis indicated that a MLT crossing of 08:00 would occur. NASA Headquarters Earth Science Division then decided to terminate the EO-1 mission starting October 2016 with spacecraft passivation occurring November 2016 through February 2017 and full operations shut down to occur by March 2017. The reasons for the decommissioning were:

1. The early MLT would greatly limit the usefulness of the data for science research and application support.
2. There was only limited utility of extending EO-1 mission for high latitude observations.
3. There was limited potential scientific benefit and users of the proposed Lunar Lab.

EO-1 was deactivated on 30 March 2017. At the time of deactivation, it was estimated that the satellite would remain in orbit until 2056, when it will burn up in Earth's atmosphere.
