= Canadian Geospace Monitoring =

Canadian space science program

Schematic of Earth's magnetosphere

Canadian Geospace Monitoring (CGSM) is a Canadian space science program that was initiated in 2005. CGSM is funded primarily by the Canadian Space Agency, and consists of networks of imagers, meridian scanning photometers, riometers, magnetometers, digital ionosondes, and High Frequency SuperDARN radars. The overarching objective of CGSM is to provide synoptic observations of the spatio-temporal evolution of the ionospheric thermodynamics and electrodynamics at auroral and polar latitudes over a large region of Canada.

== Background ==
The interaction between the solar wind and the Earth's magnetic field has a number of consequences. In brief, these are the formation of the terrestrial Magnetosphere, the provision of energy and matter to the [magnetosphere], and the powering of large-scale electric currents and the closely related phenomenon of the aurora. Near-Earth space physical processes are of interest for economic reasons and for what we can learn about our environment and the cosmos. These processes are connected along the magnetic field to the Earth's ionosphere, where they lead to the aurora, heating, modification of composition, and large-scale plasma motions. All of these ionospheric processes are interesting in their own right. In addition, there is an increasing understanding of the correspondence between ionospheric processes and processes going on further out in near-Earth space. In this way, observations of the ionospheric processes can be used to in turn remote sense dynamics in near-Earth space.

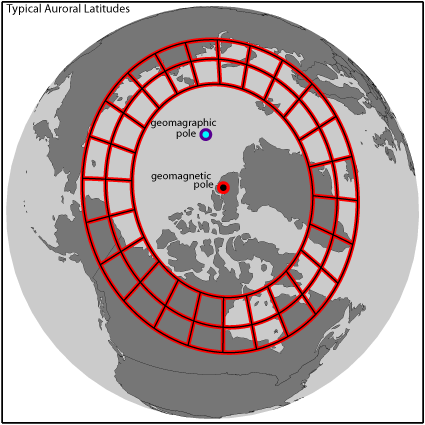
Contours of constant magnetic latitude and longitude. Latitude contours correspond to 65, 70, and 75 degrees. The bulk of the northern hemisphere auroral region that can be remote sensed from the ground is over Canada.

The interaction is significant at sub-auroral, auroral, and polar latitudes where large regions of the magnetosphere are mapped along the magnetic field into relatively small regions of the ionosphere, and where the magnetospheric dynamics are controlled primarily by the plasma rather than the magnetic field. This organization is actually by magnetic rather than by geographic latitude (see Baker and Wing, and references therein for a description of magnetic vs. geographic coordinates). The aurora, for example, is most frequently observed at magnetic latitudes between roughly 60 and 80 degrees (see Eather). In the northern hemisphere Canada has the largest land mass at the magnetic latitudes. As a consequence of this so-called "Canadian-advantage", Canada has been a world-leader in ground-based auroral and ionospheric research for decades.

CGSM was envisaged as a national program aimed at obtaining world-class ionospheric observations, and with those in hand directly studying ionospheric dynamics and indirectly the magnetospheric dynamics. It was developed with the guiding principles embodied in five grand challenge science themes. In summary, the science themes are related to the reconnection and convection cycle, magnetospheric instabilities, the formation of the aurora, and the acceleration, transport, and loss of magnetospheric plasma.

== Technical Description of the Instrument Network ==
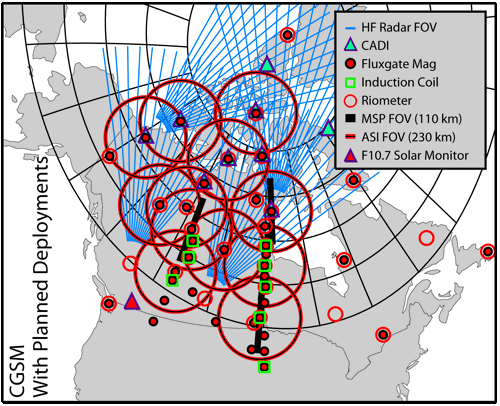
CGSM instrument complement after completion of ongoing enhancements to the Canadian ground-based space science instrument network. Note contours of constant magnetic latitude from 60 to 80 degrees, showing the large fraction of the auroral region that is over Canada.

The CGSM science objectives dictate the observational requirements. In short, the program is designed to specify particle precipitation (aurora), electric currents, and plasma convection in the ionosphere over a large region of Canada. This requires networks of ground-based magnetometers, ionosondes, High-Frequency radars, all-sky imagers, meridian scanning photometers, and riometers. Furthermore, these networks must have overlapping Fields-of-View that span latitudes from the polar region, through the auroral zone, to sub-auroral latitudes. The observations must be of sufficient time and spatial resolution, and of sufficient quality (what determines quality depends on the instrument in question) to allow for new science to be derived from the observations.

Anticipated CGSM stakeholders met in Edmonton in June 2002 to initiate planning for the program. An ambitious plan was settled on, requiring numerous new instruments of various types to be deployed in challenging remote environments. The instruments would need to operate autonomously for long periods, and suffer few breakdowns. Much of the data would need to be recovered in real-time in order for CGSM to develop into an important space weather program, in addition to its space science objectives. New instruments would need to be acquired, outfitted and fielded at existing and new sites. To accomplish this, the team settled on using Telesat Canada's HSi High Speed Satellite Internet system, in conjunction with an information technology infrastructure (basically a glorified local area network with additional capabilities including UPS, GPS, and attached hard-disk storage). Further, members of the team applied to the Canada Foundation for Innovation for funds for new instruments, and were successful on all fronts. The resulting funding enabled the deployment (which is still ongoing) of an additional 8 All-Sky Imagers, 14 fluxgate magnetometers, 8 induction coil magnetometers, and two additional SuperDARN radars (the new "PolarDARN" radars). In addition to facilities that were already in place in 2002 (from the Canadian Space Agency's CANOPUS program, the Natural Resources Canada CANMOS magnetometer array, and the NSERC supported NORSTAR, SuperDARN, and CADI programs), the final array will certainly meet the scientific requirements.

CGSM began formally with the issuing of contracts to teams at the University of Calgary (photometers, riometers, ASIs), the University of Alberta (simulation, data management, fluxgate magnetometers), and the University of Saskatchewan (SuperDARN HF radars with a subcontract to the University of Western Ontario for digital ionosondes), Natural Resources Canada (space weather operations), and the National Research Council (solar monitor). As well, the University of Calgary developed a new system for managing information technology at the remote sites. In 2007, the CSA called for proposals for the second phase of CGSM. More than 20 proposals were submitted in October, 2007, and contracts were awarded in 2008 for continued and enhanced CGSM activities.

== Synergy With Satellite Missions ==
In a recent review of major Canadian space science projects, Liu et al. pointed out that CGSM is a unique facility, owing in part to the above-mentioned fact that the bulk of the northern hemisphere auroral region that can be remote sensed from the ground is over Canadian territory, and in part due to a significant investment in new experimental infrastructure that is being and will be realized during the period 2004-2010.

CGSM complements numerous satellite and international ground-based programs. The synergies between CGSM and satellite missions, for example, are very important. Satellites measure the plasma processes at work in the magnetosphere and ionosphere directly using magnetometers, and electric field, plasma wave, and particle detectors. These processes, however, are truly multi-scale, with important scale sizes ranging from kilometers or less to tens of thousands of kilometers. Satellite observations are essential because they are our only direct look at the processes of interest. At the same time, the satellites are like "needles in a haystack", owing to the enormous scale sizes of the magnetospheric system and the fact that all the scales seem to be important in the overall dynamic.

The magnetospheric dynamics are projected along magnetic field lines into the ionosphere and are visible, for example, in changes in the aurora and large-scale ionospheric plasma motions. So we get a two-dimension picture of the magnetospheric dynamics which provides an essential complement to the satellite observations. This synergy and its value in advancing science has been increasingly recognized in recent years. The European Space Agency's Cluster mission included a Ground-Based Working Group that was created with the express purpose of maximizing the impact of coordinated ground-based observations (see Amm et al., for a description of the impact of the Cluster Ground-Based Working Group). The five-satellite NASA THEMIS mission launched on February 17, 2006 includes a ground-based component consisting of 20 ground-based observatories (some of which incorporate CGSM magnetometer data), indicating the recognition of the importance of coordinated ground-based observations.
