= Conveyor chain =

Chain designed for chain conveyor systems

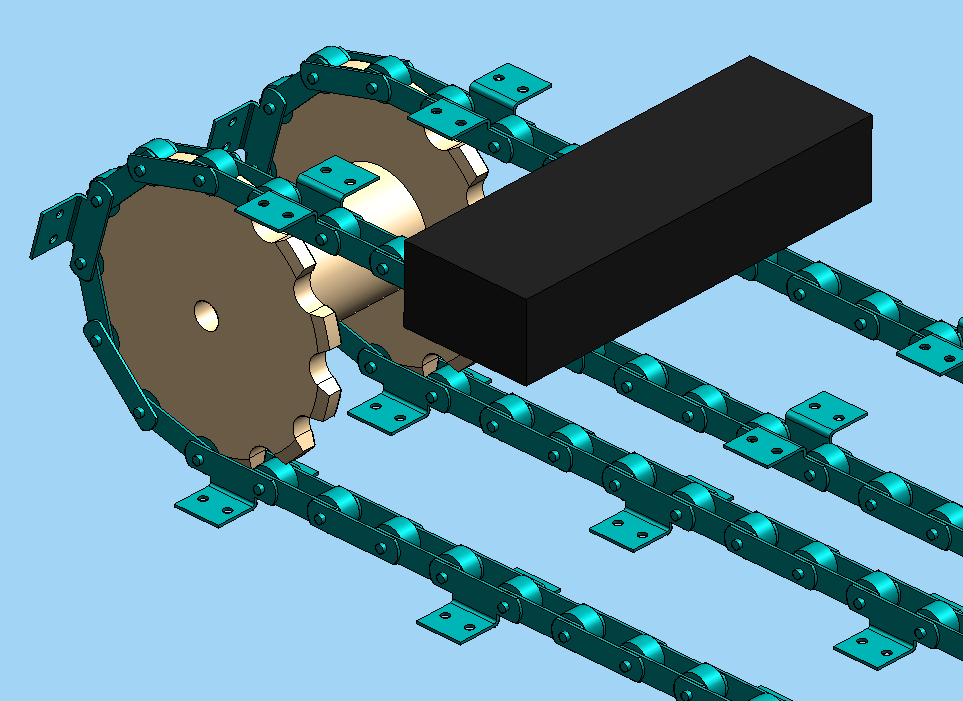
General layout

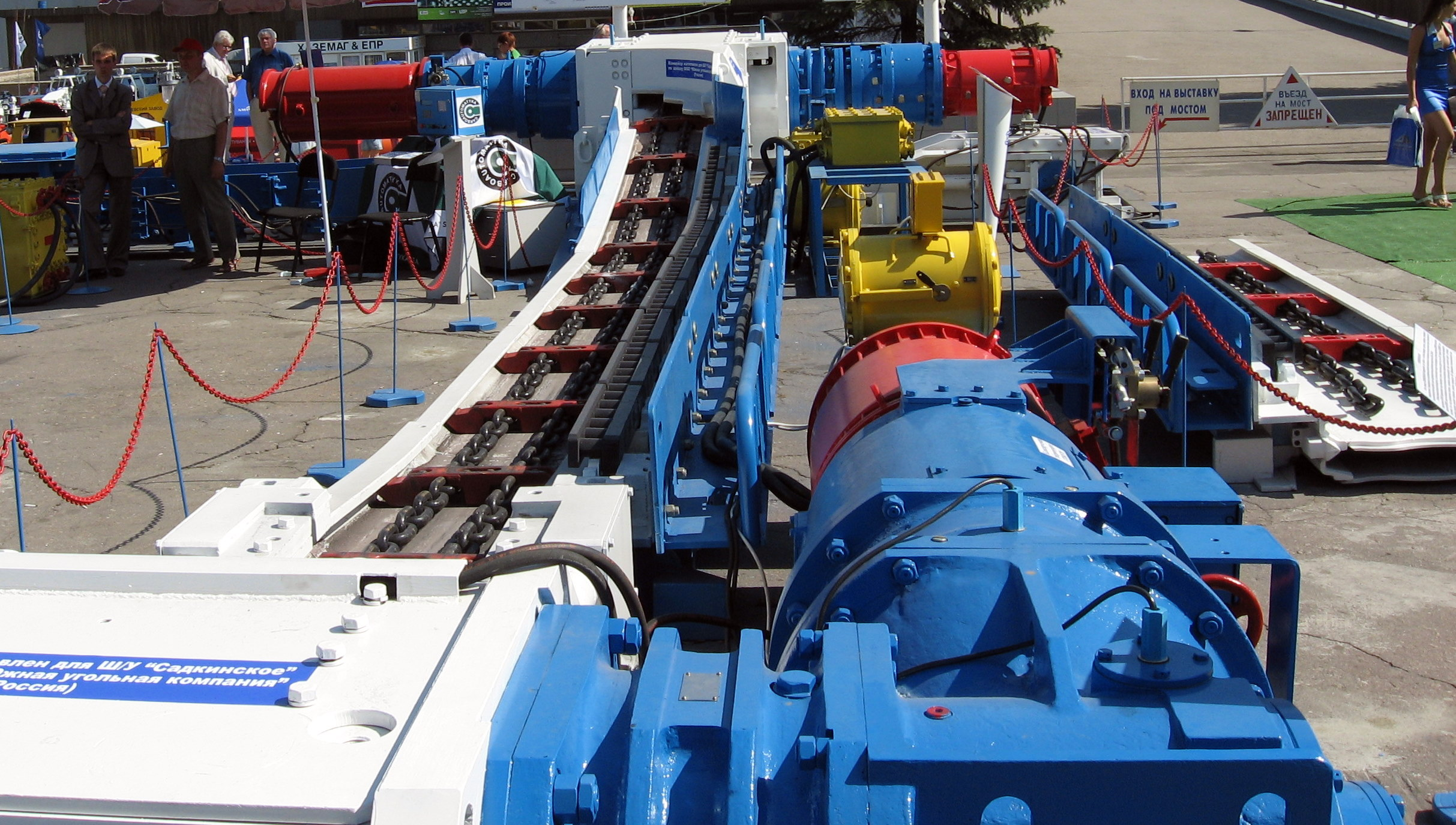
A chain conveyor for mining use

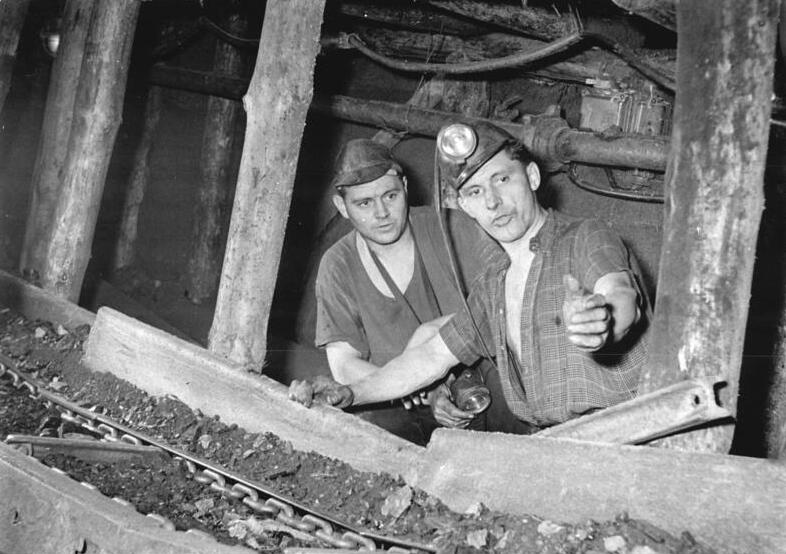
Chain conveyor in use (German coal mine, 1950s)

A conveyor chain is chain that has been designed specifically for chain conveyor systems. It consists of a series of journal bearings that are held together by constraining link plates. Each bearing consists of a pin and a bush on which the chain roller revolves.

== Types ==
1. Hollow bearing pin chain

Hollow bearing pin chain allows attachments to be bolted through the hollow bearing pins. Attachments may be tightly fixed or held in a 'free' manner.

2. Solid bearing pin chain

Solid bearing pin chain has the same dimensions as hollow bearing pin chain but is more robust and thus suitable for more arduous conveyor applications.

3. Deep link chain

Deep link chain has deeper side plates than the normal chain plates and so provides a continuous carrying edge above the roller periphery. Deep link chain comes in solid and hollow bearing pin varieties.

4. Drop forged chain

Drop forged chain (also known as en-masse conveyor chain or scraper chain) is already fitted with attachments that have been welded directly onto the chain links.

== Pitch ==
Each type of conveyor chain is available in a range of different pitches. The minimum pitch is dictated by the need for adequate wheel tooth strength and the maximum is determined by plate rigidity. The maximum pitch can be exceeded if the chain is strengthened with bushes between the link plates and there is still enough clearance with the wheel teeth.

== Attachments ==
Attachments are fitted to a conveyor chain to adapt it for a particular conveying application. Conveyor chain attachments are typically made from steel but scrapers made from multi-laminated beech are becoming increasingly common, especially in the cement, biomass and recycling industries.

== Conveyor sprockets ==
Sprockets are used in the conveyor system to drive the chain. Conveyor sprockets typically have an odd number of teeth although sprockets with an even number have become more prevalent over the last thirty years. Most sprockets are made from fabricated steel and are parallel or taper keyed to a through shaft. Conveyor sprockets are also available in double pitch and shear pin varieties. Double pitch sprockets wear evenly and offer a longer service life than standard sprockets. Shear pin sprockets break when overloaded, stopping the conveyor and saving considerable expense and downtime.

== Lubrication ==
In order for a conveyor chain to perform well, the bearing surfaces must be lubricated. Correct lubrication will minimise power absorption, wear rate, corrosion and noise. In normal conditions and operating temperatures a quality mineral oil with medium viscosity e.g. SAE 20W50 will suffice. Self-lubricating chains that require no additional lubrication are available from a variety of chain manufacturers as well.

== International standards ==
Conveyor chain can be manufactured to a number of different standards.

1. British Standard

The British Standard chain designed to meet the requirements of the British market as well as those where British engineering design and purchasing dominates.

2. International Organization for Standardization

The International Organization for Standardization is used throughout the European market except in Germany which has its own standard.

3. Deutsche Institut für Normung

This standard is the dominant standard in Germany and is not interchangeable with the BS and ISO standards.

== Uses ==
Conveyor chains are used in

- Mining
- Food processing
- Sewage treatment
- Timber harvesting
- Agriculture
- Textile machinery
- Car plants
- Cement works
- Material handling

== Bibliography ==
- Oberg, Erik; Jones, Franklin D.; Horton, Holbrook L.; Ryffel, Henry H. (1996), Green, Robert E.; McCauley, Christopher J. (eds.), Machinery's Handbook (25th ed.), New York: Industrial Press, ISBN 978-0-8311-2575-2, OCLC 473691581.
