= Landsat 9 =

American earth observation satellite

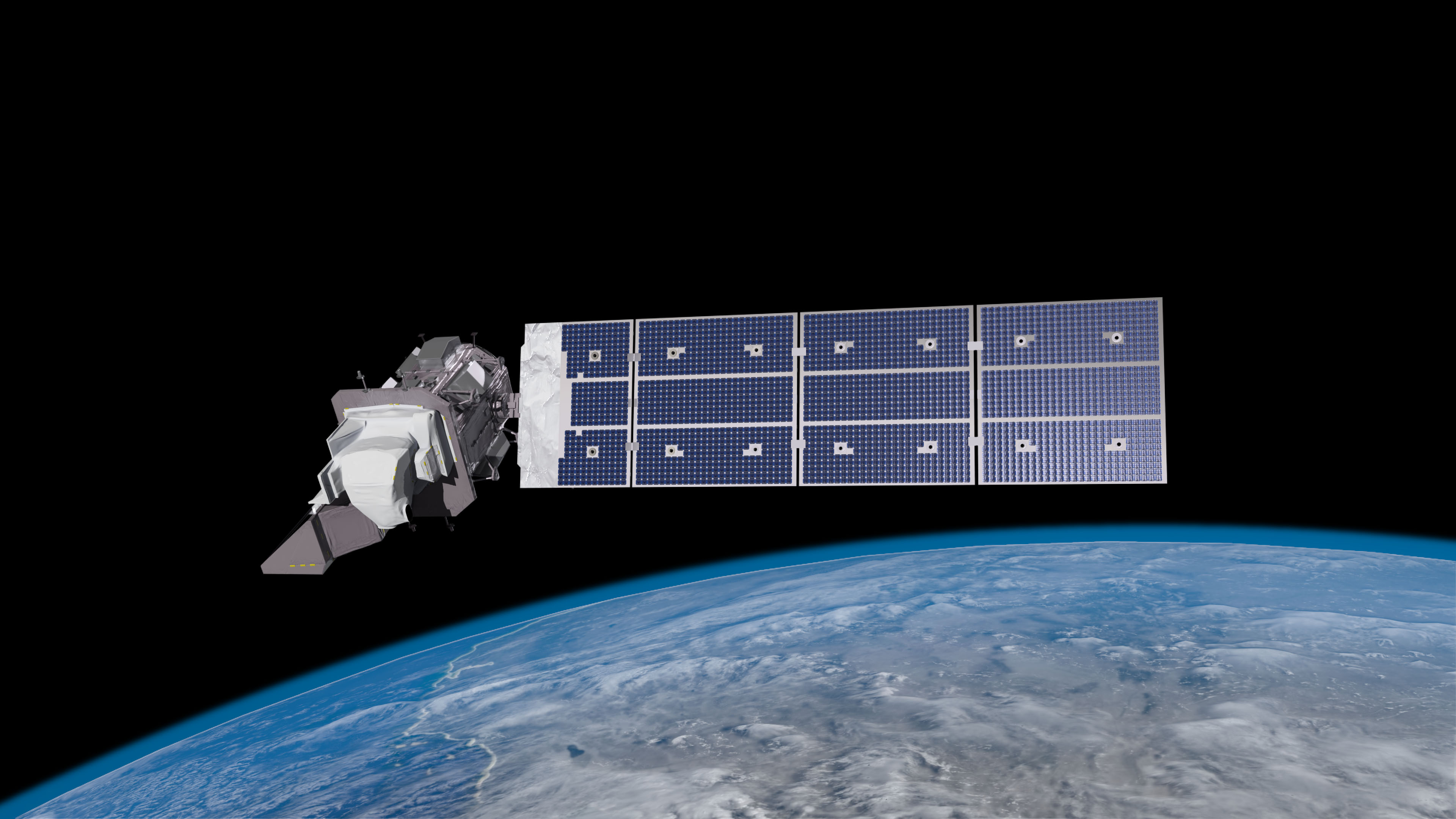
- Landsat 9 in orbit
- Mission type: Satellite imagery
- Operator: NASA / USGS
- COSPAR ID: 2021-088A
- SATCAT no.: 49260
- Website: Landsat 9
- Mission duration: 15 years - with fuel (planned); 4 years, 10 months, 30 days (in progress)

Spacecraft properties
- Spacecraft: Landsat 9
- Spacecraft type: Landsat
- Bus: LEOStar-3
- Manufacturer: Northrop Grumman Innovation Systems
- Launch mass: 2,711 kg (5,977 lb)
- Dimensions: 4.6 m × 3 m × 3 m (15.1 ft × 9.8 ft × 9.8 ft)
- Power: 4300 watts

Start of mission
- Launch date: 27 September 2021, 18:12:00 UTC
- Rocket: Atlas V 401 (AV-092)
- Launch site: Vandenberg, SLC-3E
- Contractor: United Launch Alliance
- Entered service: January 6, 2022

Orbital parameters
- Reference system: Geocentric orbit
- Regime: Sun-synchronous orbit
- Altitude: 705 km (438 mi)
- Inclination: 98.2°
- Period: 99.0 minutes
- Repeat interval: 16 days

Instruments
- Operational Land Imager-2 (OLI-2); Thermal Infrared Sensor-2 (TIRS-2)
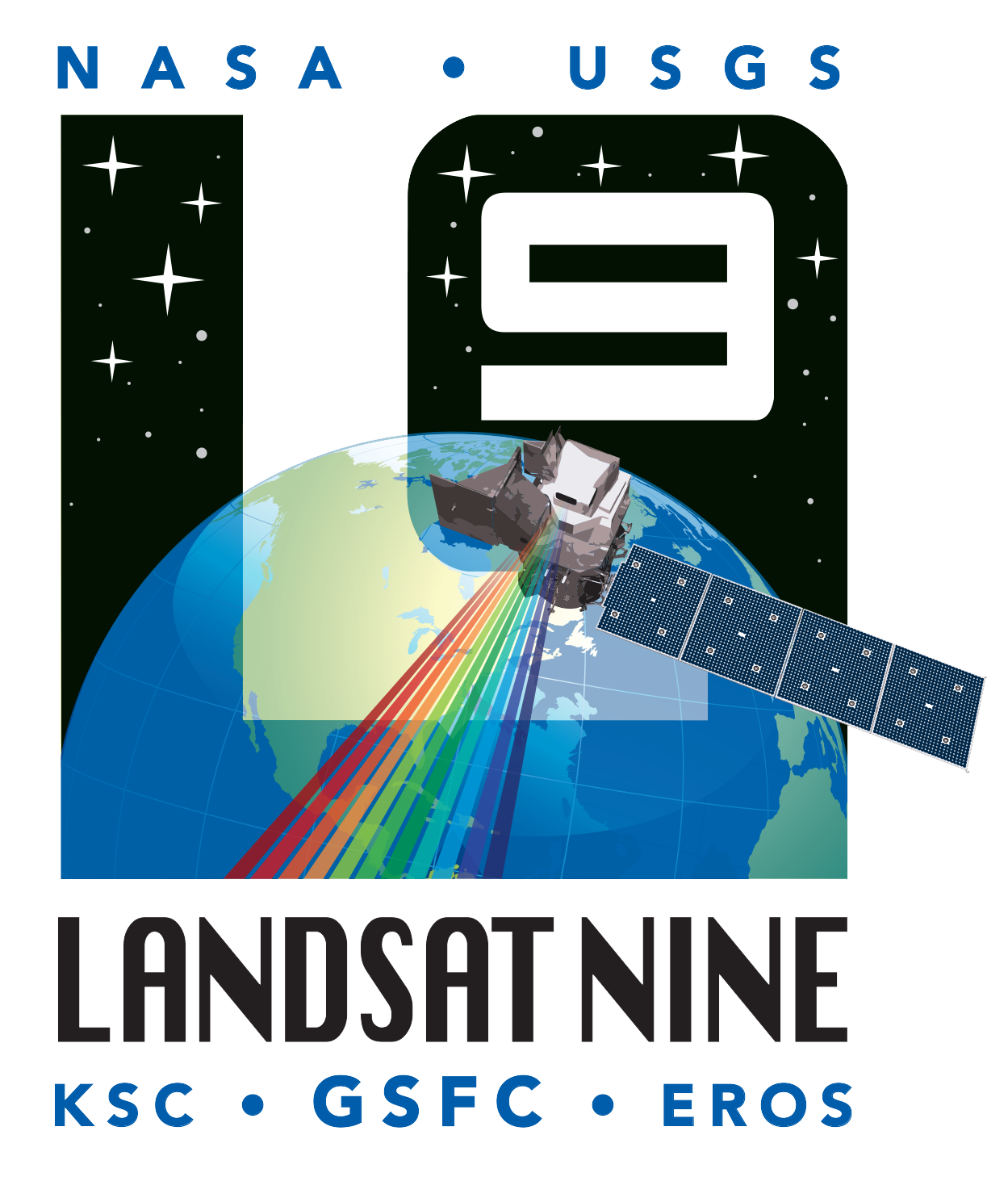
- LANDSAT 9 mission patch Landsat program

Landsat 9 is an Earth observation satellite launched on 27 September 2021 from Space Launch Complex-3E at Vandenberg Space Force Base on an Atlas V 401 launch vehicle. NASA is in charge of building, launching, and testing the satellite, while the United States Geological Survey (USGS) operates the satellite, and manages and distributes the data archive. It is the ninth satellite developed in the Landsat program, and eighth to reach orbit (Landsat 6 failed to reach orbit). The Critical Design Review (CDR) was completed by NASA in April 2018, and Northrop Grumman Innovation Systems (NGIS) was given the go-ahead to manufacture the satellite.

== Design ==
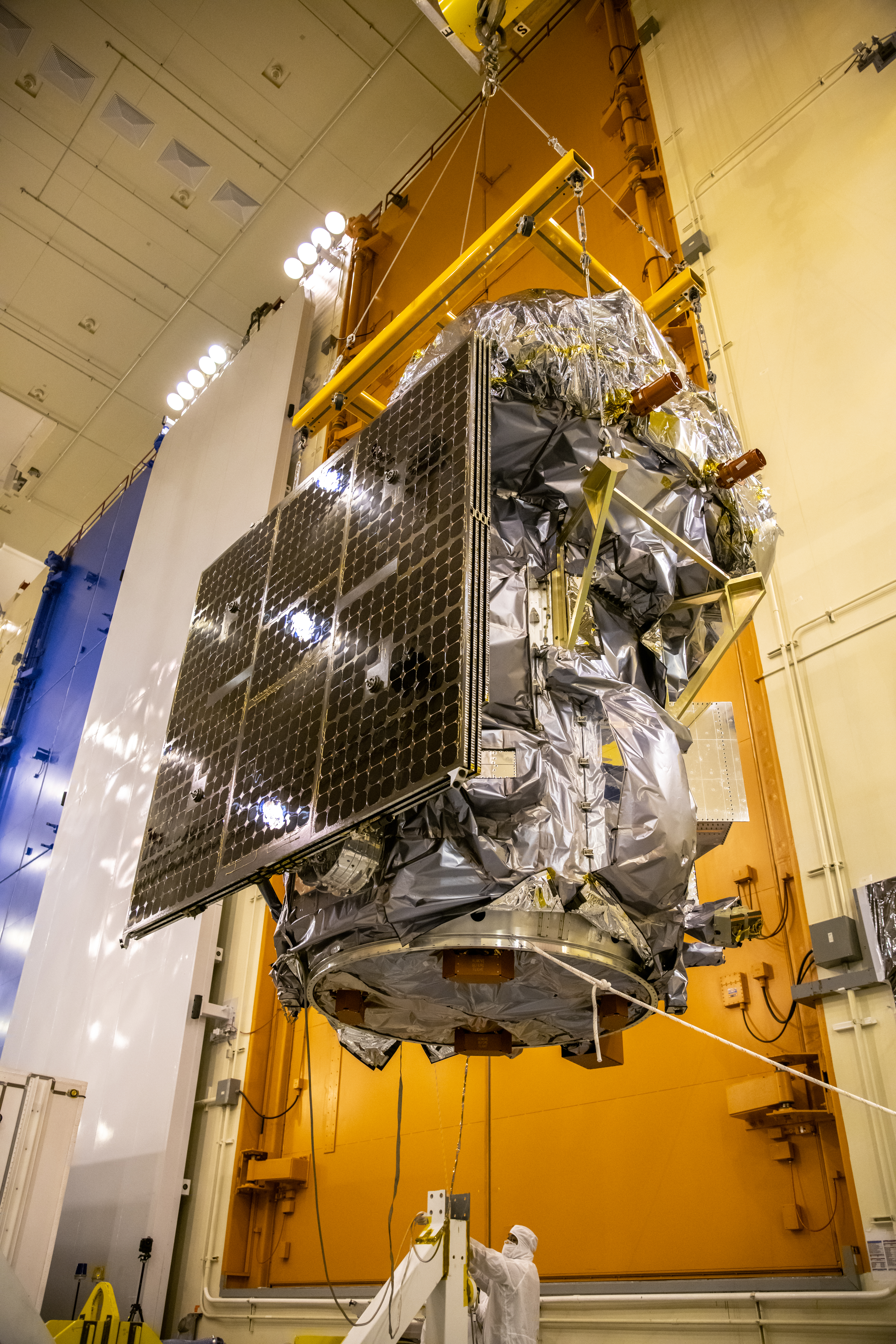
Landsat 9

The design and construction of Landsat 9 were assigned by NASA, under a delivery order contract to Orbital ATK, in October 2016. The purchase cost of US$129.9 million is part of a five-year contract between the two entities. The budget that provides for initial work on Landsat 9 also calls for research into less expensive and smaller components for future Landsat hardware.

Landsat 9 will largely replicate the functions of its predecessor Landsat 8. The former will include near-identical copies of remote sensors: the Operational Land Imager (OLI) and the Thermal Infrared Sensor (TIRS) instruments – optical and thermal sensors respectively – that will be designated OLI-2 and TIRS-2; the latter will be upgraded to a risk class B implementation (high priority, high national significance, high complexity) while no changes will be applied to OLI-2.

NASA selected Ball Aerospace & Technologies to provide the OLI-2 instrument through a sole source procurement. OLI-2 will collect data for nine spectral bands with a ground sample distance (GSD) of 30 m for all bands except the panchromatic band, which has a 15 m GSD.

NASA assigned the TIRS-2 instrument as a directed development to Goddard Space Flight Center (GSFC). Design changes to the TIRS-2 are intended to address the stray light and Scene Select Mechanism (SSM) encoder problems experienced with the TIRS on Landsat 8. Testing and assessment of the TIRS-2 demonstrate the stray light magnitude has been reduced to insignificant levels.

== Launch ==
Landsat 9 was launched on 27 September 2021 at 18:12 UTC. This is 4–5 years after the end of Landsat 7's mission design lifetime and near the end of its maximum (fuel supply) lifetime. The Launch Services Program (LSP) at the Kennedy Space Center (KSC) controlled the launch operations, which was conducted from Vandenberg Space Force Base. The launch of Landsat 9 was delayed to September 2021 due to the effects of the COVID-19 pandemic on spacecraft work in Arizona.

== See also ==
- Landsat program
- Sentinel-2 a comparable satellite mission operated by the European Space Agency
