= Landsat program =

American network of Earth-observing satellites for international research purposes

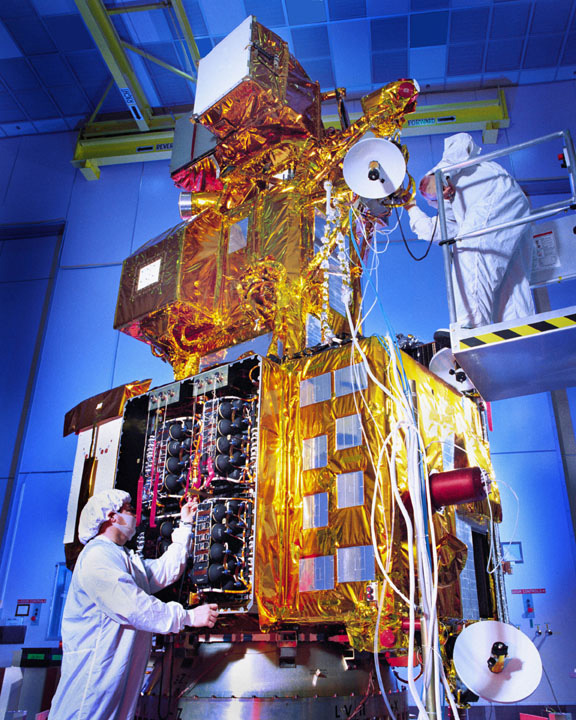
Landsat 7, launched in 1999, is the 7th of 9 satellites in the Landsat program.

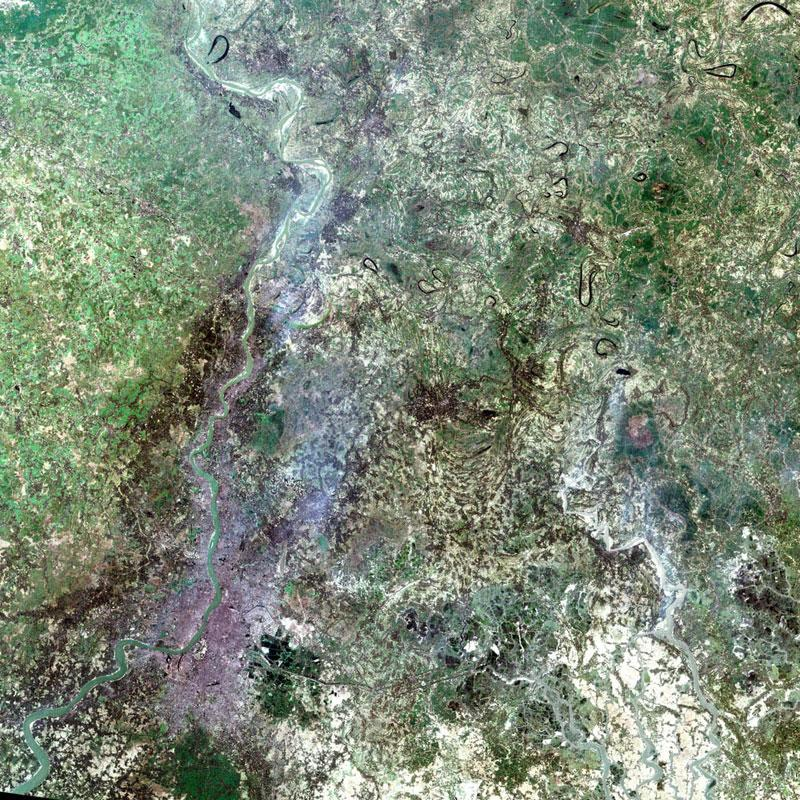
A false-color satellite image of Kolkata, India, from Landsat 7 in 2004, showing rivers, vegetated areas, and developed areas

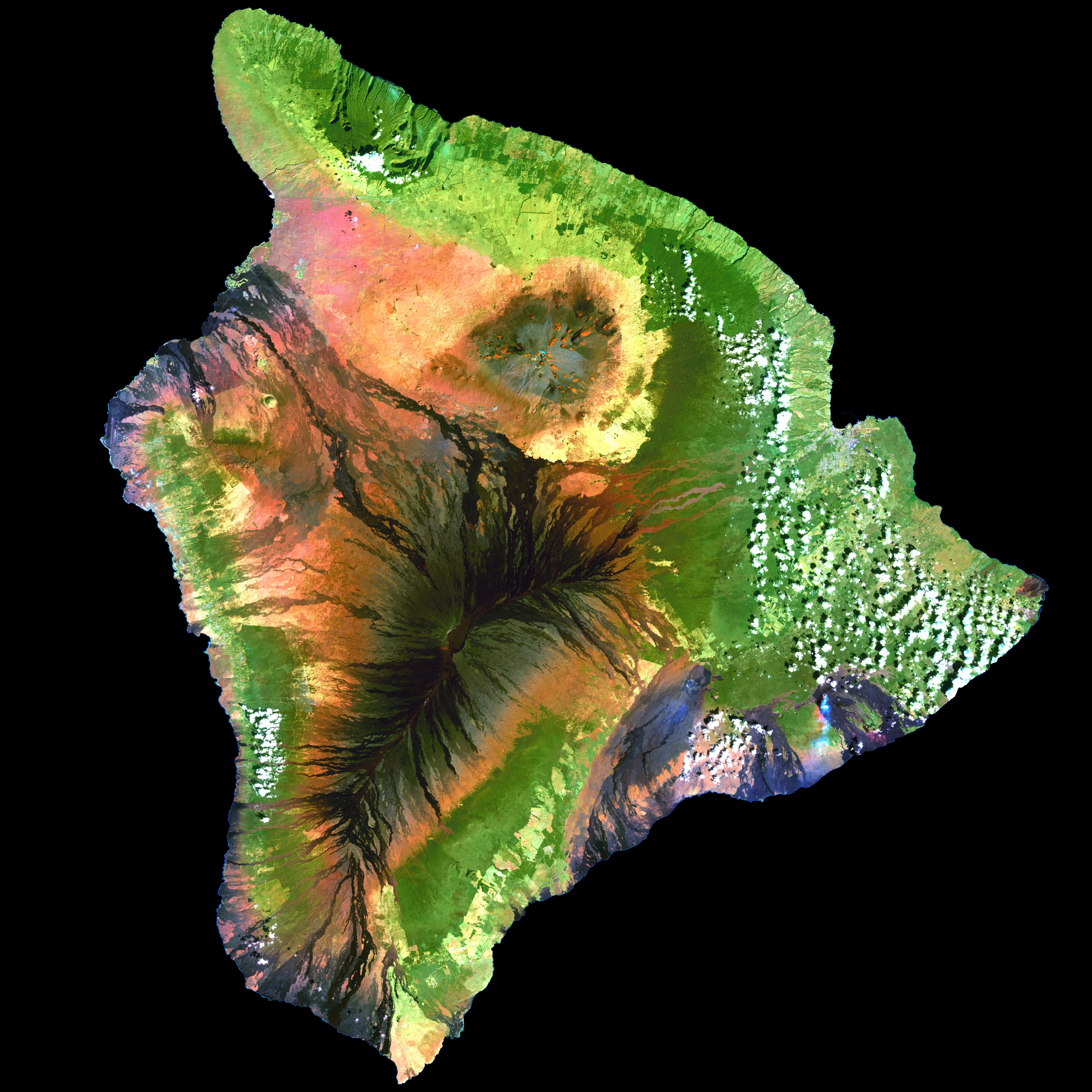
A land cover map of the big island of Hawaii using 1999–2001 data from Landsat 7, showing black lava flows from Mauna Loa, grayish dormant Mauna Kea, a plume of smoke from active Kilauea, dark green tropical forests, and light green agricultural areas

The Landsat program is the longest-running enterprise that has acquired satellite imagery of Earth. It is a joint NASA / USGS program. On 23 July 1972, the Earth Resources Technology Satellite was launched. This was eventually renamed to Landsat 1 in 1975. The most recent, Landsat 9, was launched on 27 September 2021.

The instruments on the Landsat satellites have acquired millions of images. The images, archived in the United States and at Landsat receiving stations around the world, are a unique resource for global change research and applications in agriculture, cartography, geology, forestry, regional planning, surveillance, and education, and can be viewed through the U.S. Geological Survey (USGS) "EarthExplorer" website. Landsat 7 data has eight spectral bands with spatial resolutions ranging from 15 to 60 m (49 to 197 ft); the temporal resolution is 16 days. Landsat images are usually divided into scenes for easy downloading. Each Landsat scene is about 115 miles long and 115 miles wide (or 100 nautical miles long and 100 nautical miles wide, or 185 kilometers long and 185 kilometers wide).

== History ==
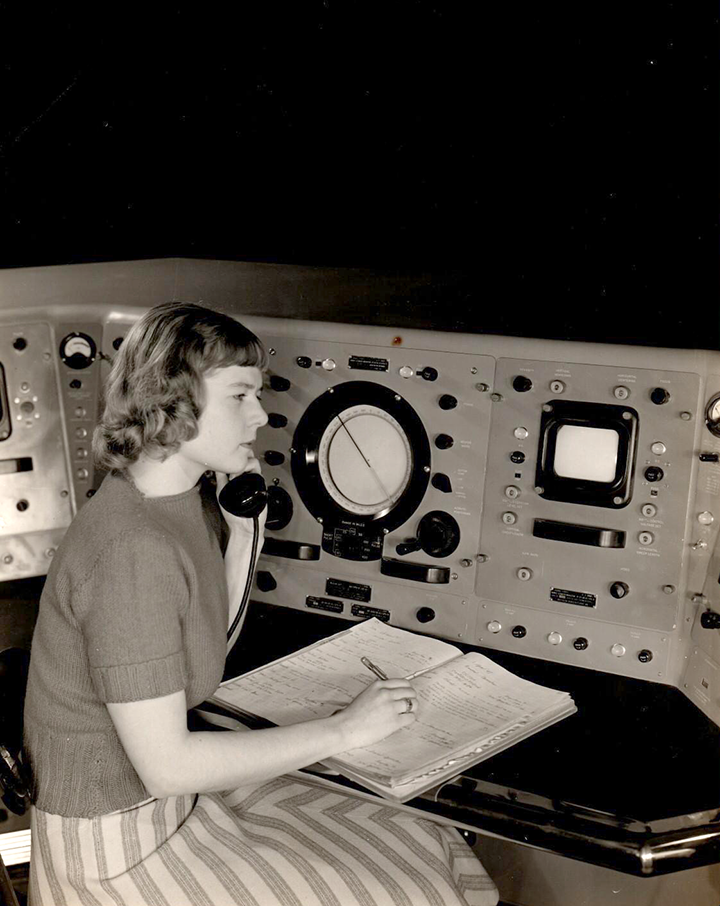
Virginia Norwood, "The Mother of Landsat", designed the multispectral scanner.

Interview with Jim Irons – Landsat 8 Project Scientist – NASA Goddard Space Flight Center

In 1965, William T. Pecora, the then director of the United States Geological Survey (USGS), proposed the idea of a remote sensing satellite program to gather facts about our planet's natural resources. Pecora stated that the program was "conceived in 1966 largely as a direct result of the demonstrated utility of the Mercury and Gemini orbital photography to Earth resource studies."

While weather satellites had been monitoring Earth's atmosphere since 1960 and were largely considered useful, there was no appreciation of terrain data from space until the mid-1960s. So, when Landsat 1 was proposed, it met with intense opposition from the Bureau of Budget and those who argued that high-altitude aircraft would be the fiscally responsible choice for Earth remote sensing. Concurrently, the Department of Defense feared that a civilian program such as Landsat would compromise the secrecy of its reconnaissance missions. Additionally, there were geopolitical concerns about photographing foreign countries without permission. In 1965, NASA began methodical investigations of Earth remote sensing using instruments mounted on planes.

In 1966, the USGS convinced the Secretary of the Interior, Stewart Udall, to announce that the Department of the Interior (DOI) would proceed with its Earth-observing satellite program. This savvy political stunt coerced NASA into expediting the building of Landsat. However, budgetary constraints and sensor disagreements between application agencies (notably the Department of Agriculture and DOI) again stymied the satellite construction process. Finally, by 1970, NASA had a green light to build a satellite. Remarkably, Landsat 1 was launched within only two years, heralding a new age of remote sensing of land from space.

The Hughes Aircraft Company from the Santa Barbara Research Center initiated, designed, and fabricated the first three Multispectral Scanners (MSS) in 1969. The first MSS prototype, designed by Virginia Norwood, was completed within nine months, in the fall of 1970. It was tested by scanning Half Dome at Yosemite National Park. Norwood was called "The Mother of Landsat" for this design work.

Working at NASA's Goddard Space Flight Center, Valerie L. Thomas managed the development of early Landsat image processing software systems and became the resident expert on the Computer Compatible Tapes, or CCTs, that were used to store early Landsat imagery. Thomas was one of the image processing specialists who facilitated the ambitious 'Large Area Crop Inventory Experiment', known as LACIE — a project that showed for the first time that global crop monitoring could be done through remote sensing with Landsat satellite imagery.

The program was initially called the Earth Resources Technology Satellites Program, which was used from 1966 to 1975. In 1975, the name was changed to Landsat. In 1979, Jimmy Carter's Presidential Directive 54 transferred Landsat operations from NASA to the National Oceanic and Atmospheric Administration (NOAA), recommended development of a long-term operational system with four additional satellites beyond Landsat 3, and recommended transition to private sector operation of Landsat. This occurred in 1985 when the Earth Observation Satellite Company (EOSAT), a partnership of Hughes Aircraft Company and RCA, was selected by NOAA to operate the Landsat system with a ten-year contract. EOSAT operated Landsat 4 and Landsat 5, had exclusive rights to market Landsat data, and was to build Landsats 6 and 7.

In 1989, this transition had not been fully completed when NOAA's funding for the Landsat program was due to run out (NOAA had not requested any funding, and the U.S. Congress had appropriated only six months of funding for the fiscal year), and NOAA directed that Landsat 4 and Landsat 5 be shut down.

The head of the newly formed National Space Council, Vice President Dan Quayle, noted the situation and arranged emergency funding that allowed the program to continue with the data archives intact.

Again in 1990 and 1991, Congress provided only half of the year's funding to NOAA, requesting that agencies that used Landsat data provide the funding for the other six months of the upcoming year.

In 1992, various efforts were made to procure funding for follow-on Landsats and continued operations, but by the end of the year, EOSAT ceased processing Landsat data. Landsat 6 was finally launched on 5 October 1993, but was lost in a launch failure. Processing of Landsat 4 and 5 data was resumed by EOSAT in 1994. NASA finally launched Landsat 7 on 15 April 1999.

Congress recognized the value of the Landsat program in October 1992 when it passed the Land Remote Sensing Policy Act (Public Law 102-555), authorizing the procurement of Landsat 7 and assuring the continued availability of Landsat digital data and images, at the lowest possible cost, to traditional and new users of the data.

By the turn of the century, the emergence of a viable U.S. commercial remote sensing industry, newly stabilized by its support to the national intelligence community, raised questions about the continued viability of a publicly managed land remote sensing satellite system. As a result, White House plans shifted to possible adoption of an MSS-like instrument onboard the NPOESS platform and, concurrently, cancellation of future Landsat satellites by the U.S. Office of Science and Technology Policy. These actions were subsequently cancelled by OSTP and the White House, causing the production of a new, national policy for Land Remote Sensing. The OSTP Plan for a National Land Imaging Program was published in 2007 following Landsat 8 re-authorization. Subsequently, the Landsat satellite system was recognized as foundational to U.S. space, earth observation, and geospatial management and policy.

== Satellite chronology ==
Instrument	Picture	Launched	Terminated	Duration	Notes
Landsat 1	Landsat 1	23 July 1972	6 January 1978	5 years, 6 months and 14 days	Originally named Earth Resources Technology Satellite 1. Landsat 1 carried two vital instruments: a camera built by the Radio Corporation of America (RCA) known as the Return Beam Vidicon (RBV); and the Multi spectral Scanner (MSS) built by the Hughes Aircraft Company.
Landsat 2	Landsat 2	22 January 1975	25 February 1982	7 years, 1 month and 3 days	Originally named Earth Resources Technology Satellite B. Nearly identical copy of Landsat 1. Payload consisting of a Return Beam Vidicon (RBV) and a Multi spectral Scanner (MSS). The specifications of these instruments were identical those of Landsat 1.
Landsat 3	Landsat 3	5 March 1978	31 March 1983	5 years and 26 days	Nearly identical copy of Landsat 1 and Landsat 2. Payload consists of a Return Beam Vidicon (RBV) and a Multi spectral Scanner (MSS). Included with the MSS was a short-lived thermal band. By this point in the program the MSS was considered more scientifically applicable than the RBV, which was omitted from future missions.
Landsat 4	Landsat 4	16 July 1982	14 December 1993	11 years, 4 months and 28 days	Landsat 4 carried an updated Multi Spectral Scanner (MSS) used on previous Landsat missions and a Thematic Mapper.
Landsat 5	Landsat 5	1 March 1984	5 June 2013	29 years, 3 months and 4 days	Nearly identical copy of Landsat 4. Longest Earth-observing satellite mission in history. Designed and built at the same time as Landsat 4, this satellite carried the same payload consisting of a Multi Spectral Scanner (MSS) and a Thematic Mapper.
Landsat 6	Landsat 6	5 October 1993	5 October 1993	0 days	Failed to reach orbit. Landsat 6 was an upgraded version of its predecessors. Carrying the same Multi spectral Scanner (MSS) but also carrying an Enhanced Thematic Mapper, which added a 15m resolution panchromatic band.
Landsat 7	Landsat 7	15 April 1999	4 June 2025	26 years, 1 month and 20 days	Operating with the scan line corrector disabled since May 2003. The main component of Landsat 7 was the Enhanced Thematic Mapper Plus (ETM+). It still consists of the 15m-resolution panchromatic band and includes a full aperture calibration. This allows for 5% absolute radiometric calibration.
Landsat 8	Landsat 8	11 February 2013	Active	13 years, 6 months and 26 days	Originally named Landsat Data Continuity Mission from launch until 30 May 2013, when NASA operations were turned over to the United States Geological Survey (USGS). Landsat 8 has two sensors with its payload, the Operational Land Imager (OLI) and the Thermal InfraRed Sensor (TIRS).
Landsat 9	Landsat_9_processing	27 September 2021	Active	4 years, 11 months and 10 days	Landsat 9 is a rebuild of its predecessor Landsat 8.

Timeline

== Spatial and spectral resolution ==
Landsat 1 through 5 carried the Landsat Multispectral Scanner (MSS). Landsat 4 and 5 carried both the MSS and Thematic Mapper (TM) instruments. Landsat 7 uses the Enhanced Thematic Mapper Plus (ETM+) scanner. Landsat 8 uses two instruments, the Operational Land Imager (OLI) for optical bands and the Thermal Infrared Sensor (TIRS) for thermal bands. The band designations, bandpasses, and pixel sizes for the Landsat instruments are:

Landsat 1–5 Multispectral Scanner (MSS)
Landsat 1–3 MSS	Landsat 4–5 MSS	Wavelength (micrometers)	Resolution (meters)
Band 4 – Green	Band 1 – Green	0.5 – 0.6	60*
Band 5 – Red	Band 2 – Red	0.6 – 0.7	60*
Band 6 – Near Infrared (NIR)	Band 3 – NIR	0.7 – 0.8	60*
Band 7 – NIR	Band 4 – NIR	0.8 – 1.1	60*

* Original MSS pixel size was 79 x 57 meters; production systems now resample the data to 60 meters.

Landsat 4–5 Thematic Mapper (TM)
Bands	Wavelength (micrometers)	Resolution (meters)
Band 1 – Blue	0.45 – 0.52	30
Band 2 – Green	0.52 – 0.60	30
Band 3 – Red	0.63 – 0.69	30
Band 4 – NIR	0.76 – 0.90	30
Band 5 – Shortwave Infrared (SWIR) 1	1.55 – 1.75	30
Band 6 – Thermal	10.40 – 12.50	120* (30)
Band 7 – SWIR 2	2.08 – 2.35	30

* TM Band 6 was acquired at 120-meter resolution, but products are resampled to 30-meter pixels.

Landsat 7 Enhanced Thematic Mapper Plus (ETM+)
Bands	Wavelength (micrometers)	Resolution (meters)
Band 1 – Blue	0.45 – 0.52	30
Band 2 – Green	0.52 – 0.60	30
Band 3 – Red	0.63 – 0.69	30
Band 4 – NIR	0.77 – 0.90	30
Band 5 – SWIR 1	1.55 – 1.75	30
Band 6 – Thermal	10.40 – 12.50	60* (30)
Band 7 – SWIR 2	2.09 – 2.35	30
Band 8 – Panchromatic	0.52 – 0.90	15

* ETM+ Band 6 is acquired at 60-meter resolution, but products are resampled to 30-meter pixels.

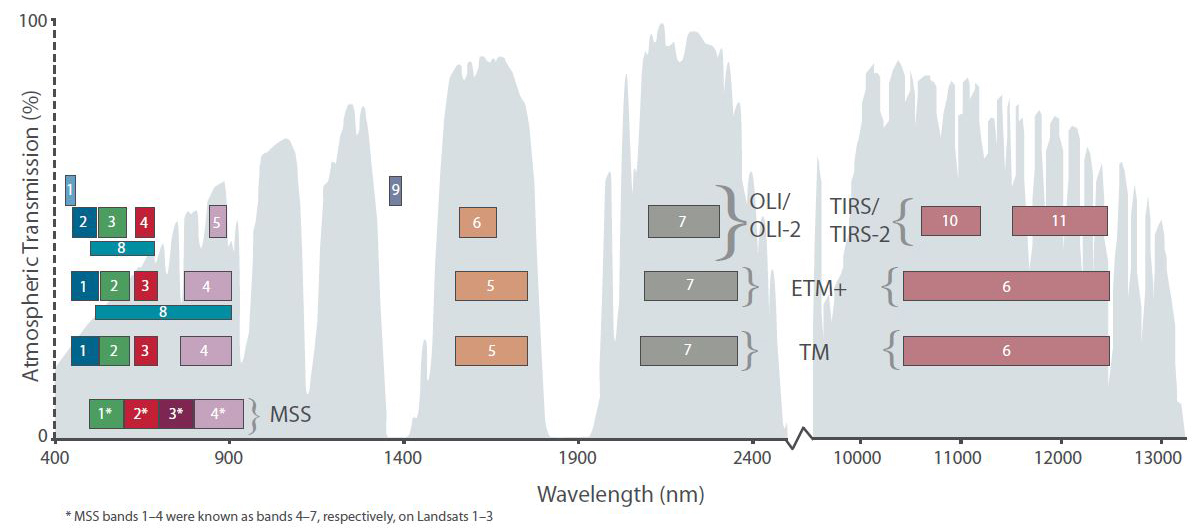
The spectral band placement for each sensor of Landsat

Landsat 8 Operational Land Imager (OLI) and Thermal Infrared Sensor (TIRS)
Bands	Wavelength (micrometers)	Resolution (meters)
Band 1 - Ultra Blue (coastal/aerosol)	0.435 – 0.451	30
Band 2 - Blue	0.452 – 0.512	30
Band 3 - Green	0.533 – 0.590	30
Band 4 – Red	0.636 – 0.673	30
Band 5 – NIR	0.851 – 0.879	30
Band 6 – SWIR 1	1.566 – 1.651	30
Band 7 – SWIR 2	2.107 – 2.294	30
Band 8 – Panchromatic	0.503 – 0.676	15
Band 9 – Cirrus	1.363 – 1.384	30
Band 10 – Thermal 1	10.60 – 11.19	100* (30)
Band 11 – Thermal 2	11.50 – 12.51	100* (30)

* TIRS bands are acquired at 100 meter resolution, but are resampled to 30 meter resolution in the delivered data product.

An advantage of Landsat imagery, and remote sensing in general, is that it provides data at a synoptic global level that is impossible to replicate with in situ measurements. However, there are tradeoffs between the local detail of the measurements (radiometric resolution, number of spectral bands) and the spatial scale of the measured area. Landsat imagery is coarse in spatial resolution compared to other remote sensing methods, such as imagery from airplanes. Landsat's spatial resolution is relatively high compared to other satellites, yet its revisit time is relatively less frequent.

== MultiSpectral Scanner (MSS) ==
The Landsat program incorporated the Multispectral Scanner (MSS) from its first mission to its fifth. The MSS gave the United States an advantage in satellite imaging, facilitating the launch of Landsat ahead of the French SPOT satellite.

The MSS was unique in its design. It employed a moving mirror, rather than a static camera, capturing Earth's images in four distinct spectral bands. This capability allowed the MSS to record variations in sunlight reflected from the Earth. Notably, Landsat 3's MSS was further advanced, with an added capability to detect heat radiation.

One of the prominent features of the MSS was its consistent imaging. Each captured frame represented an area on the Earth's surface approximately 83 meters in length and 68 meters in width. Additionally, the system was designed to ensure a continuous image sweep across a swath equivalent to 185 km on the Earth's surface. The MSS's design also emphasized precision; by precisely timing the mirror's movements, it ensured that consecutive images did not overlap.

However, by the 1980s, the cost dynamics shifted. Accessing Landsat's imagery became substantially more expensive, making the French SPOT satellite's images a more cost-effective alternative for many users. The rise in Landsat's prices can be attributed to U.S. policy shifts, initiated under Carter's leadership and finalized during Ronald Reagan's administration.

== Uses of Landsat imagery ==
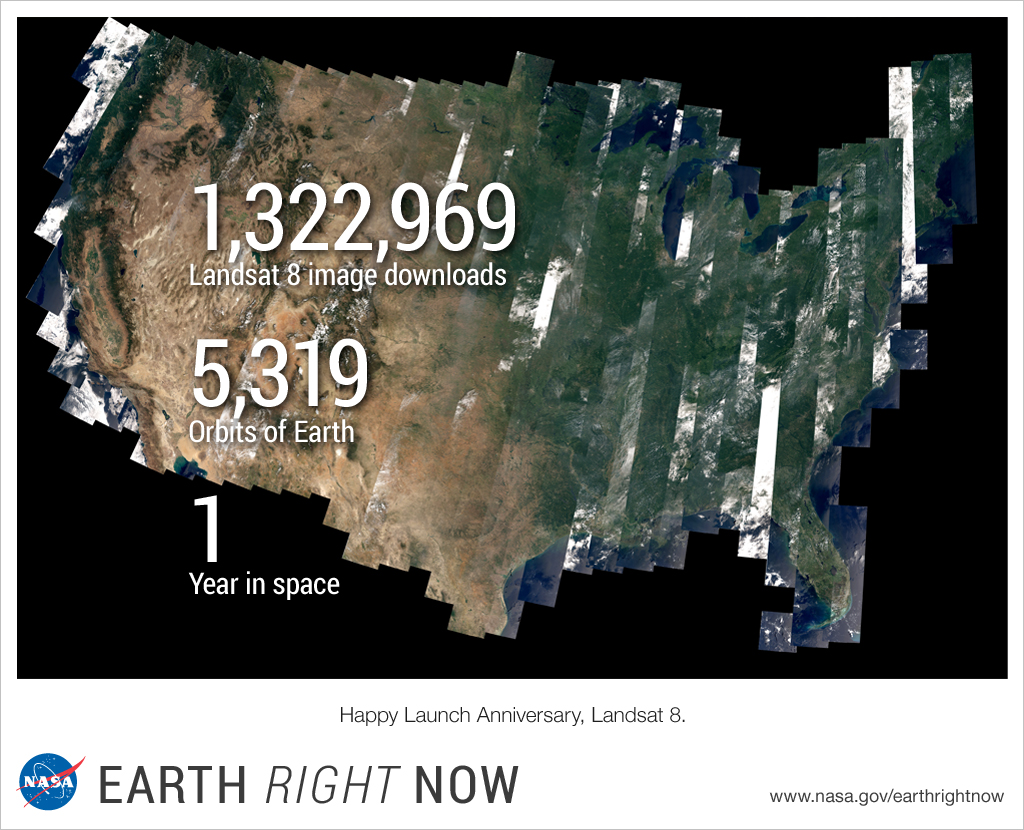
One year after launch, Landsat 8 imagery had over one million file downloads by data users.

Landsat data provides information that allows scientists to predict species distribution and detect both naturally occurring and human-generated changes over a greater scale than traditional data from field work. The different spectral bands used on satellites in the Landsat program provide many applications, ranging from ecology to geopolitical matters. Land cover-determination is a common use of Landsat imagery around the world.

Landsat imagery provides one of the longest uninterrupted time series available from any single remote sensing program, spanning from 1972 to the present. Looking to the future, the successful launch of Landsat 9 in 2021 shows that this time series will continue.

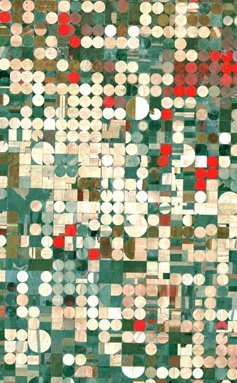
A false-color image of irrigated fields near Garden City, Kansas, taken by the Landsat 7 satellite

In 2015, the Landsat Advisory Group of the National Geospatial Advisory Committee reported that the top 16 applications of Landsat imagery produced savings of approximately 350 million to over 436 million dollars each year for federal and state governments, non-governmental organizations (NGOs), and the private sector. That estimate did not include further savings from other uses beyond the top sixteen categories. The top 16 categories for Landsat imagery use, listed in order of estimated annual savings for users, are:

1. U.S. Department of Agriculture risk management
2. U.S. Government mapping
3. Agricultural water use monitoring
4. Global security monitoring
5. Support for fire management
6. Detection of forest fragmentation
7. Detection of forest change
8. World agriculture supply and demand estimates
9. Vineyard management and water conservation
10. Flood mitigation mapping
11. Agricultural commodities mapping
12. Waterfowl habitat mapping and monitoring
13. Coastal change analysis
14. Forest health monitoring
15. National Geospatial-Intelligence Agency global shoreline mapping
16. Wildfire risk assessment

Further uses of Landsat imagery include, but are not limited to: fisheries, forestry, shrinking inland water bodies, fire damage, glacier retreat, urban development, and the discovery of new biological species. A few specific examples are explained below.

=== Natural resources management ===
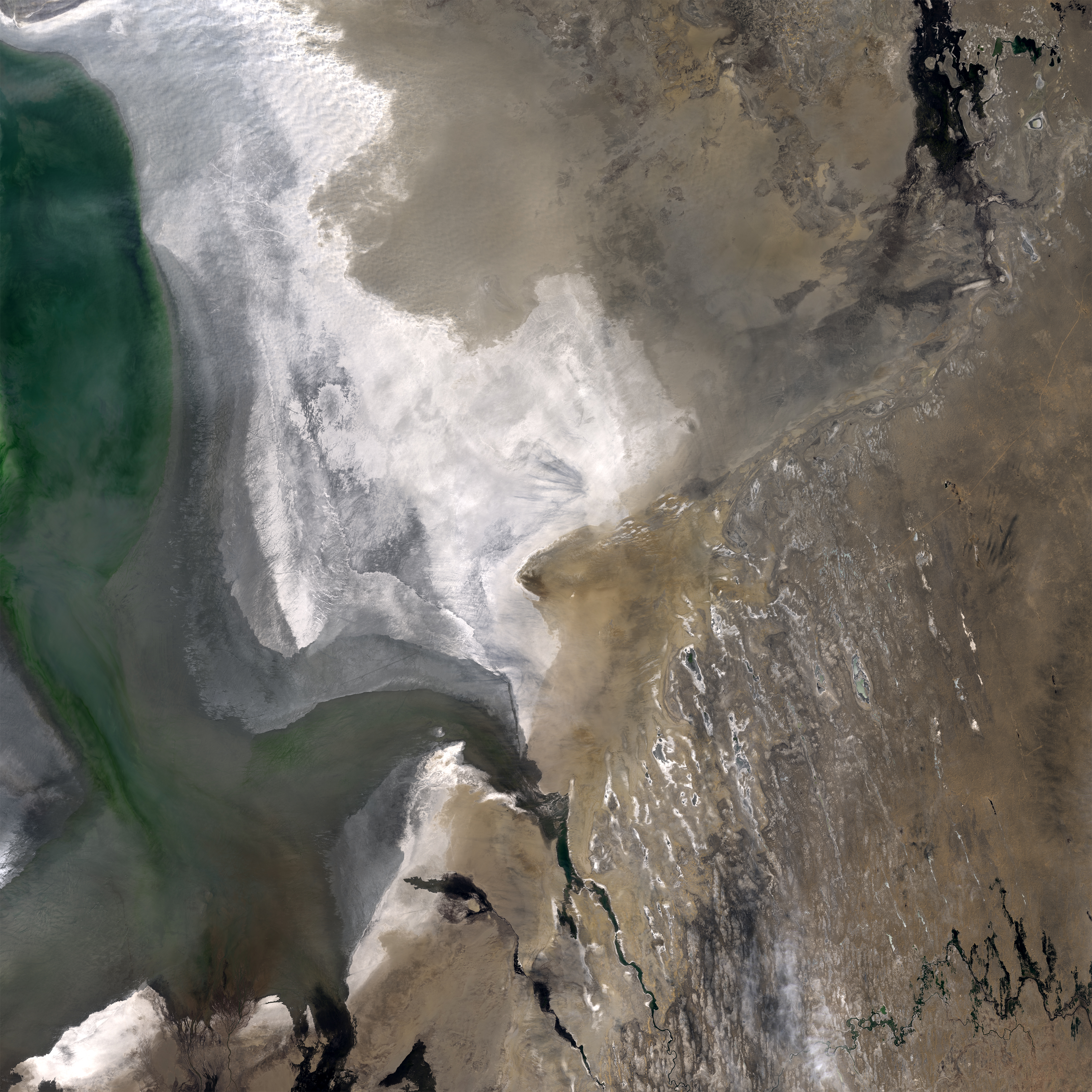
Landsat image of the Aral Sea in 2013

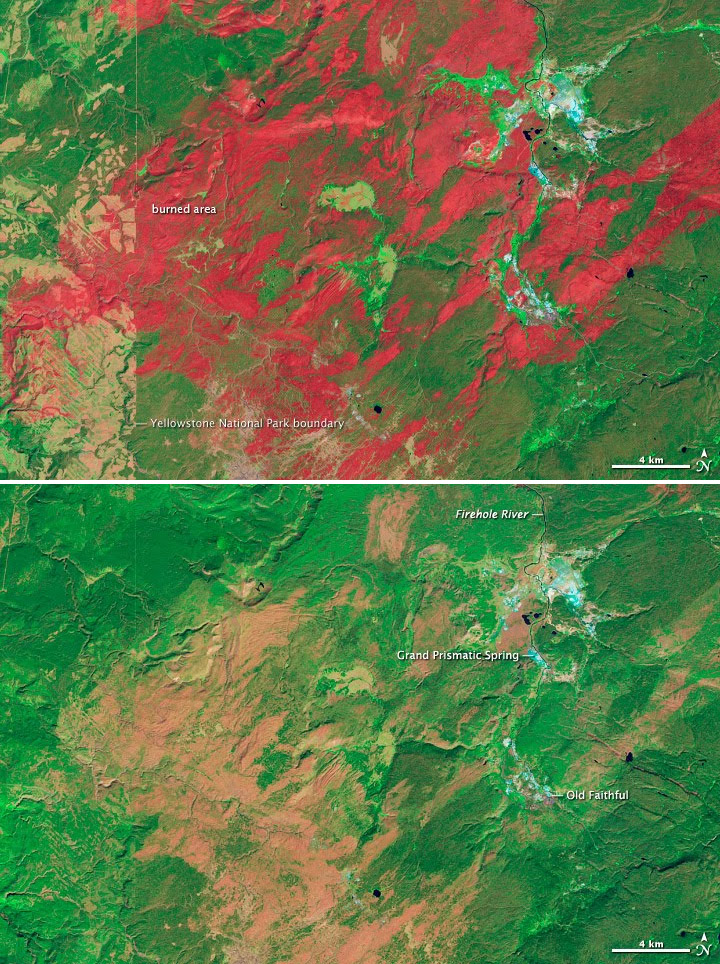
Landsat images of burned land in Yellowstone National Park in 1989 and 2011

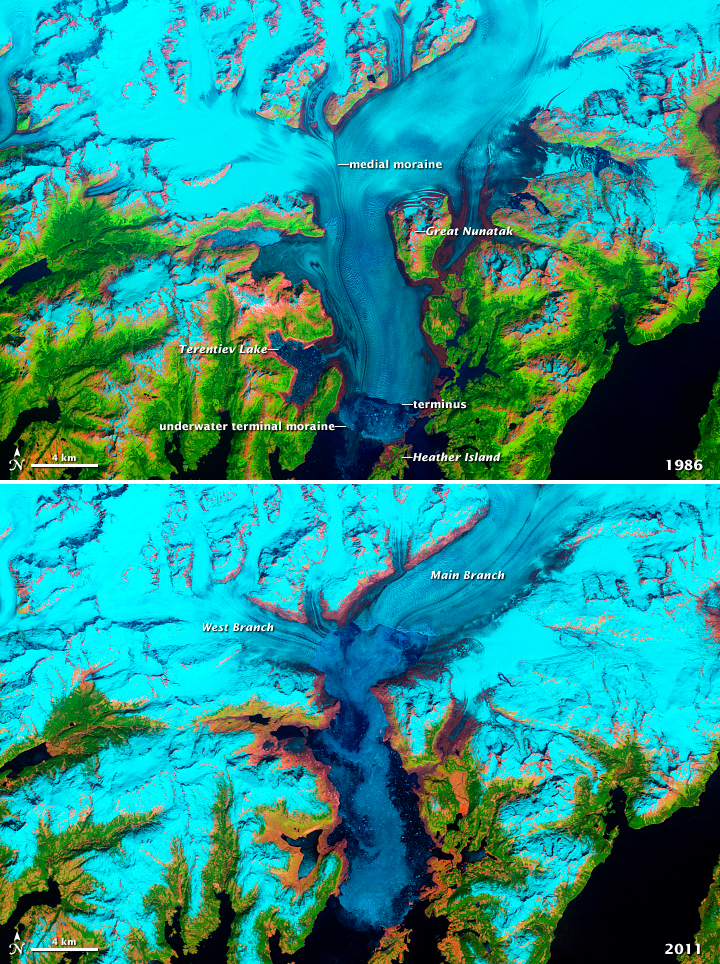
Landsat-5 false color images of the Columbia Glacier, Alaska in 1986 and 2011

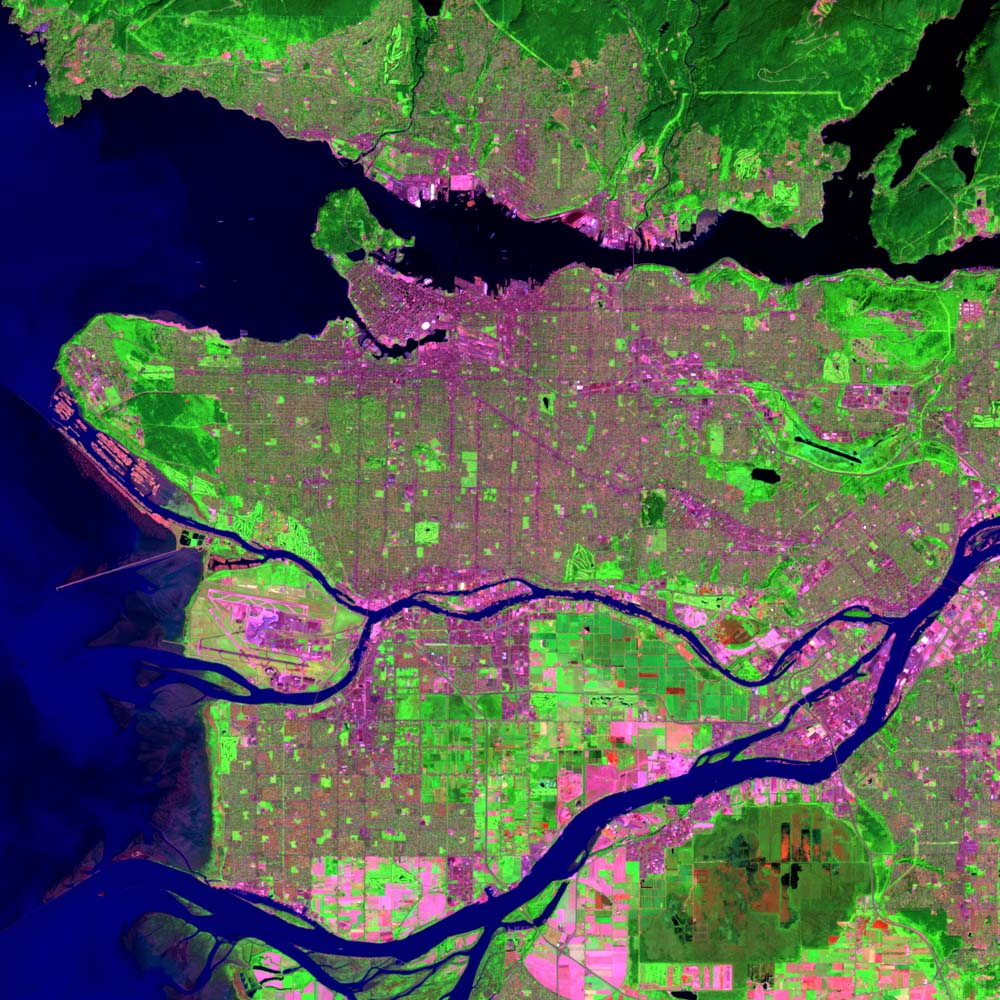
Landsat false color image highlighting developed areas in pink in Vancouver, British Columbia, Canada

==== Fisheries ====
In 1975, one potential application for the new satellite-generated imagery was to find high yield fishery areas. Through the Landsat Menhaden and Thread Investigation, some satellite data of the eastern portion of the Mississippi sound and another area off the coast of the Louisiana coast data was run through classification algorithms to rate the areas as high and low probability fishing zones, these algorithms yielded a classification that was proven with in situ measurements – to be over 80% accurate and found that water color, as seen from space, and turbidity significantly correlate with the distribution of menhaden – while surface temperature and salinity do not appear to be significant factors. Water color – measured with the multispectral scanners' four spectral bands, was used to infer Chlorophyll, turbidity, and possibly fish distribution.

==== Forestry ====
An ecological study used 16 ortho-rectified Landsat images to generate a land cover map of Mozambique's mangrove forest. The main objective was to measure the mangrove cover and above-ground biomass in this zone, that until now could only be estimated. The cover was found to have a 93% accuracy of 2909 square kilometers (27% lower than previous estimates). Additionally, the study helped confirm that geological setting has a greater influence on biomass distribution than latitude - the mangrove area is spread across 16° of latitude but the biomass volume of it was affected more strongly by geographic conditions.

=== Climate change and environmental disasters ===
==== Shrinking of the Aral Sea ====
The shrinking of the Aral Sea has been described as "One of the planet's worst environmental disasters". Landsat imagery has been used as a record to quantify the amount of water loss and the changes to the shoreline. Satellite visual images have a greater impact on people than just words, showing the importance of Landsat imagery and satellite images in general.

==== Fires in Yellowstone National Park ====
The Yellowstone fires of 1988 were the worst in the recorded history of the national park. They lasted from 14 June to 11 September 1988, when rain and snow helped halt the spread of the fires. The area affected by the fire was estimated to be 3,213 square kilometers – 36% of the park. Landsat imagery was used for the area estimation, and also helped determine why the fire spread so quickly. Historic drought and a significant number of lightning strikes were some of the factors that created conditions for the massive fire, but anthropogenic actions amplified the disaster. On images generated before the fire, there is an evident difference between lands that display preservation practices and the lands that display clear-cut activities for timber production. These two types of land reacted differently to the stress of fires, and it is believed that this was an important factor in the behavior of the wildfire. Landsat imagery, and satellite imagery in general, have contributed to understanding fire science; fire danger, wildfire behavior, and the effects of wildfire on certain areas. It has helped in understanding how different features and vegetation fuel fires, change temperature, and affect the spreading speed.

==== Glacier retreat ====
The serial nature of Landsat missions and the fact that it is the longest-running satellite program gives it a unique perspective to generate information about Earth. Glacier retreat on a big scale can be traced back to previous Landsat missions, and this information can be used to augment climate change knowledge. The Columbia glacier retreat, for example, can be observed in false-composite images since Landsat 4 in 1986.

==== Urban development ====
Landsat imagery gives a time-lapse-like series of images of development. Human development, specifically, can be measured by the size a city grows over time. Further than just population estimates and energy consumption, Landsat imagery gives an insight into the type of urban development, and studies aspects of social and political change through visible change. In Beijing for example, a series of ring roads started to develop in the 1980s following the economic reform of 1970, and the change in development rate and construction rate was accelerated during this time period.

=== Ecology ===
==== Discovery of new species ====
In 2005, Landsat imagery assisted in the discovery of new species. Conservation scientist Julian Bayliss wanted to find areas that could potentially become conservation forests using Landsat-generated satellite images. Bayliss saw a patch in Mozambique that until then had no detailed information. On a reconnaissance trip, he found great diversity of wildlife as well as three new species of butterflies and a new snake species. Following his discovery, he continued to study this forest and was able to map and determine the forest extent.

== Recent and future Landsat satellites ==
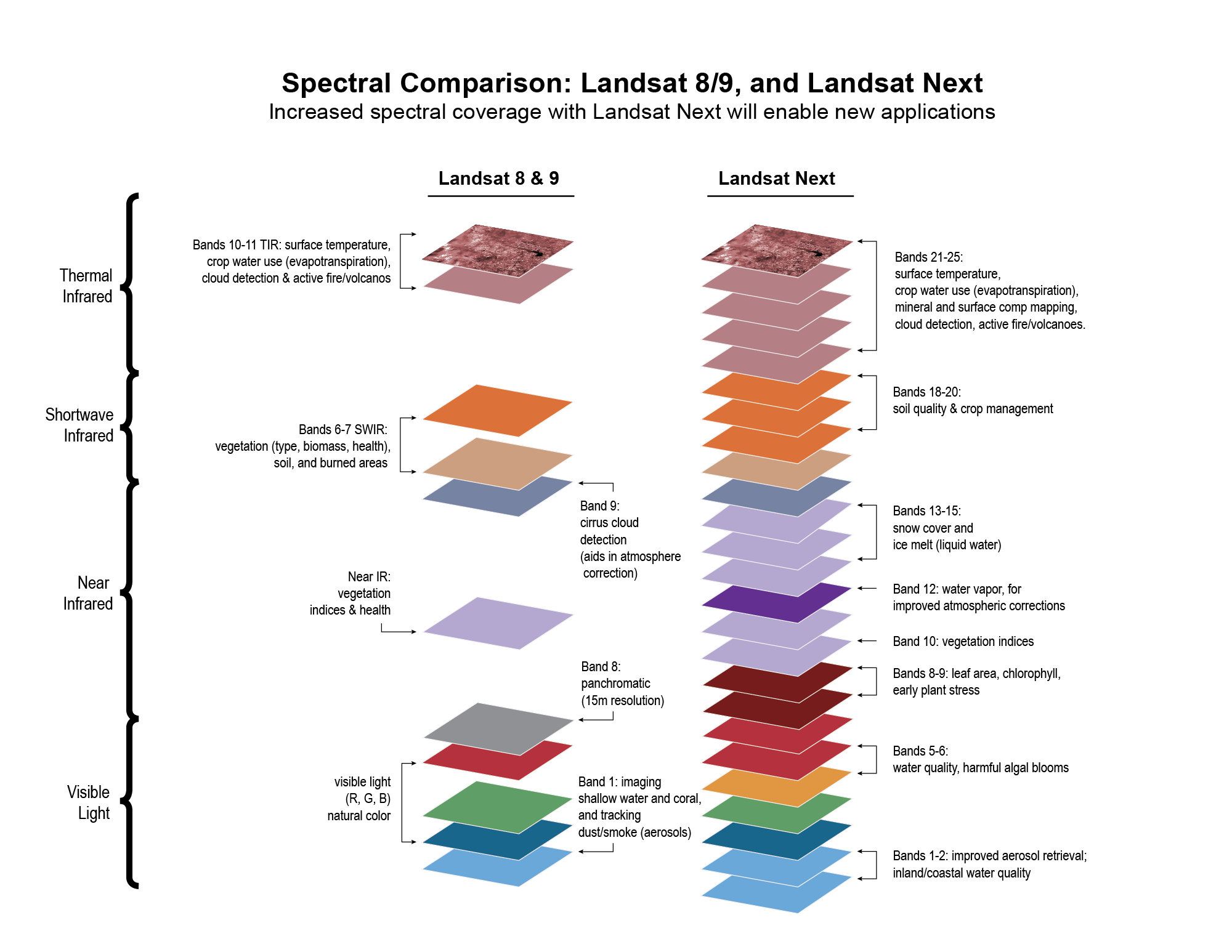
Landsat 8/9 and Landsat Next spectral band comparison

Landsat 8 launched on 11 February 2013. It was launched on an Atlas V 401 from Vandenberg Air Force Base by the Launch Services Program. It will continue to obtain valuable data and imagery to be used in agriculture, education, business, science, and government. The new satellite was assembled in Arizona by Orbital Sciences Corporation.

Landsat 9 launched on September 27, 2021. During FY2014 financial planning "appropriators chided NASA for unrealistic expectations that a Landsat 9 would cost US$1 billion, and capped spending at US$650 million" according to a report by the Congressional Research Service. United States Senate appropriators advised NASA to plan for a launch no later than 2020. In April 2015, NASA and the USGS announced that work on Landsat 9 had commenced, with funding allocated for the satellite in the president's FY2016 budget, for a planned launch in 2023. Funding for the development of a low-cost thermal infrared (TIR) free-flying satellite for launch in 2019 was also proposed to ensure data continuity by flying in formation with Landsat 8.

In the future, there may also be more collaboration between Landsat satellites and other satellites with similar spatial and spectral resolution, such as the ESA's Sentinel-2 constellation.

Landsat Next is planned to launch in late 2030/early 2031 and will measure 26 spectral bands; current Landsat's 8 and 9 measure 11 each.

== Gallery ==
Overview of the Thermal Infrared Sensor (TIRS), one of the instruments on Landsat 8

A timelapse of the Thermal Infrared Sensor (TIRS) instrument for Landsat 8 being cleaned, bagged, and packed to ship to Orbital Sciences Corp, where TIRS will be integrated with the spacecraft

Animation showing how different LDCM bands can be combined to obtain different information over the Florida Everglades

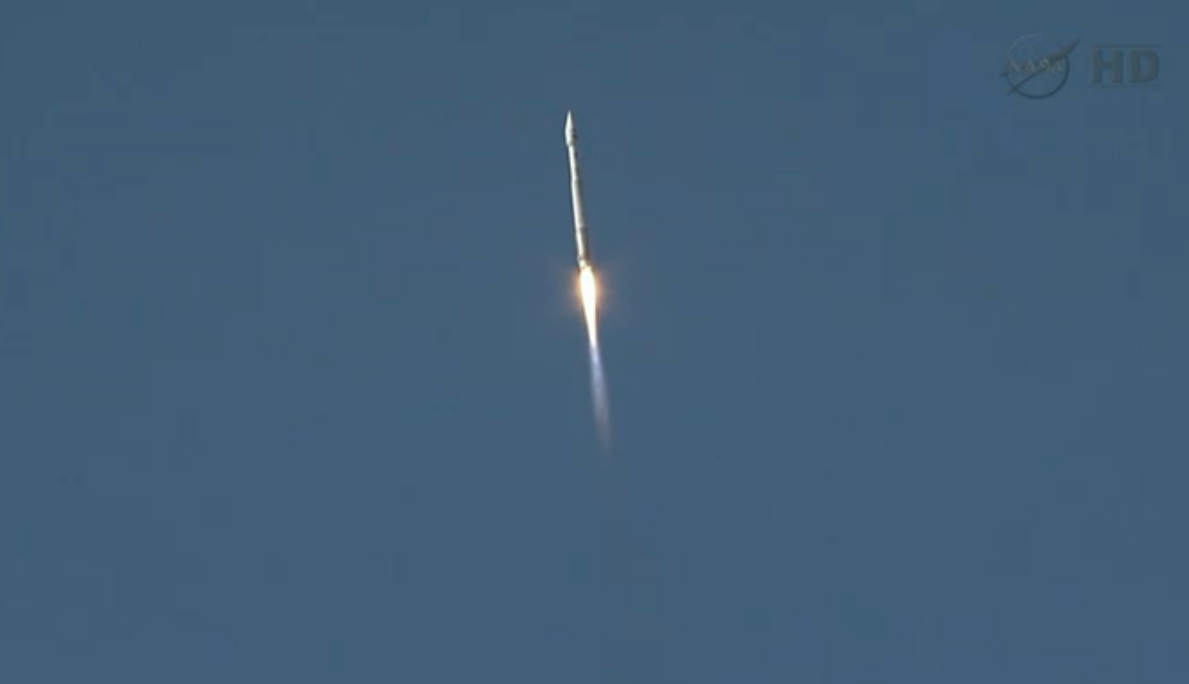
Screenshot capture from NASA TV showing the Atlas V during the launch of Landsat 8

== See also ==
- Earth observation satellite
- Geographic information system
- Orthophoto, corrected for uniform scale like a map
- Remote sensing
