= Landsat 8 =

American earth observation satellite

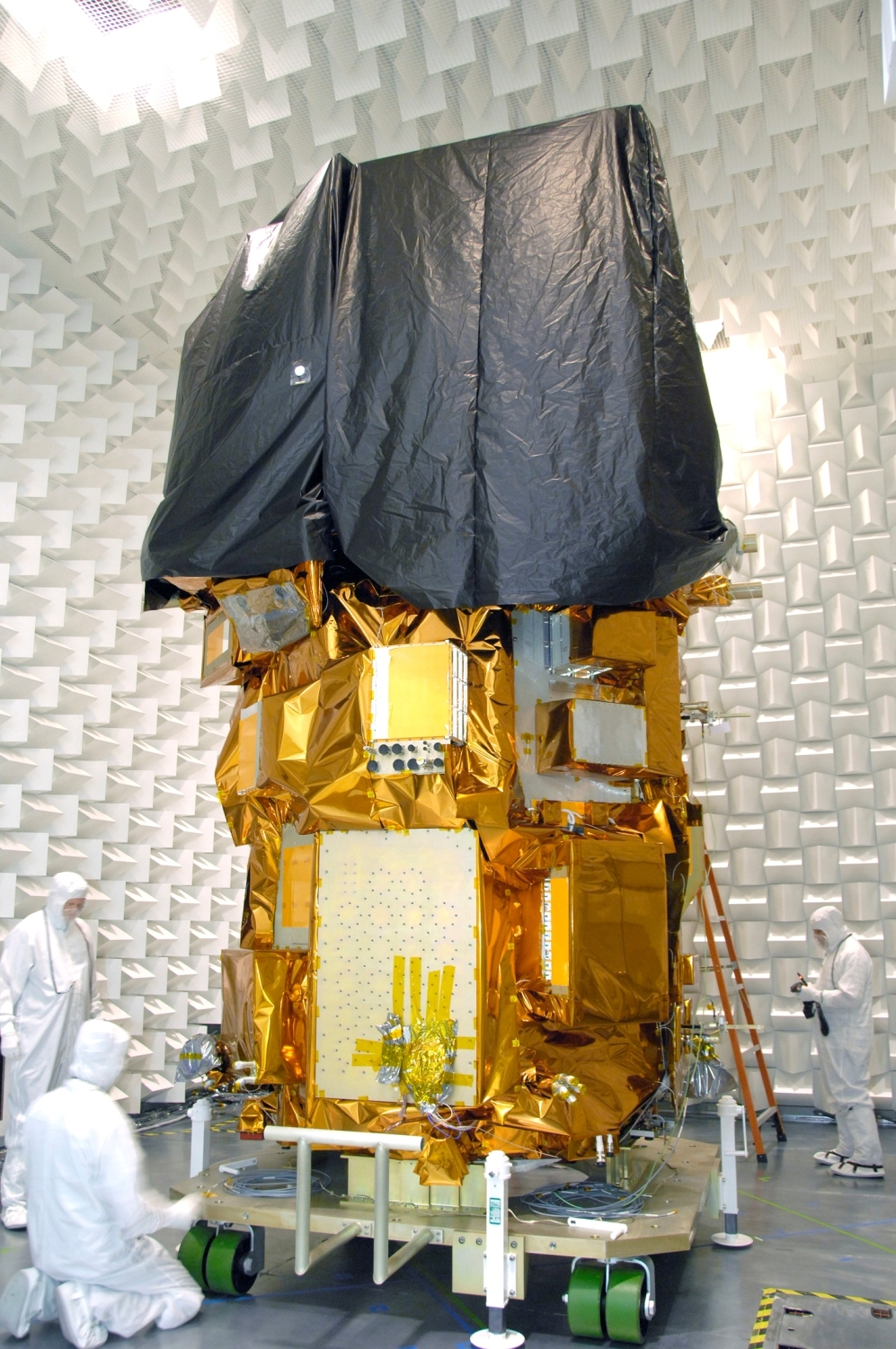
- Landsat 8 during ground testing
- Names: Landsat Data Continuity Mission
- Mission type: Satellite imagery
- Operator: NASA / USGS
- COSPAR ID: 2013-008A
- SATCAT no.: 39084
- Mission duration: 5 years (planned); 10 years (with fuel); Elapsed: 13 years, 6 months, 8 days

Spacecraft properties
- Spacecraft: Landsat 8
- Spacecraft type: LEOStar
- Bus: LEOStar-3
- Manufacturer: Orbital Sciences (prime); Ball Aerospace (OLI); NASA GSFC (TIRS)
- Launch mass: 2,623 kg (5,783 lb)
- Dry mass: 1,512 kg (3,333 lb)

Start of mission
- Launch date: 11 February 2013, 18:02:00 UTC
- Rocket: Atlas V 401 (AV-035)
- Launch site: Vandenberg, SLC-3E
- Contractor: United Launch Alliance
- Entered service: 30 May 2013

Orbital parameters
- Reference system: Geocentric orbit
- Regime: Sun-synchronous orbit
- Altitude: 705 km
- Inclination: 98.22°
- Period: 98.8 minutes

Instruments
- Operational Land Imager (OLI); Thermal Infrared Sensor (TIRS)
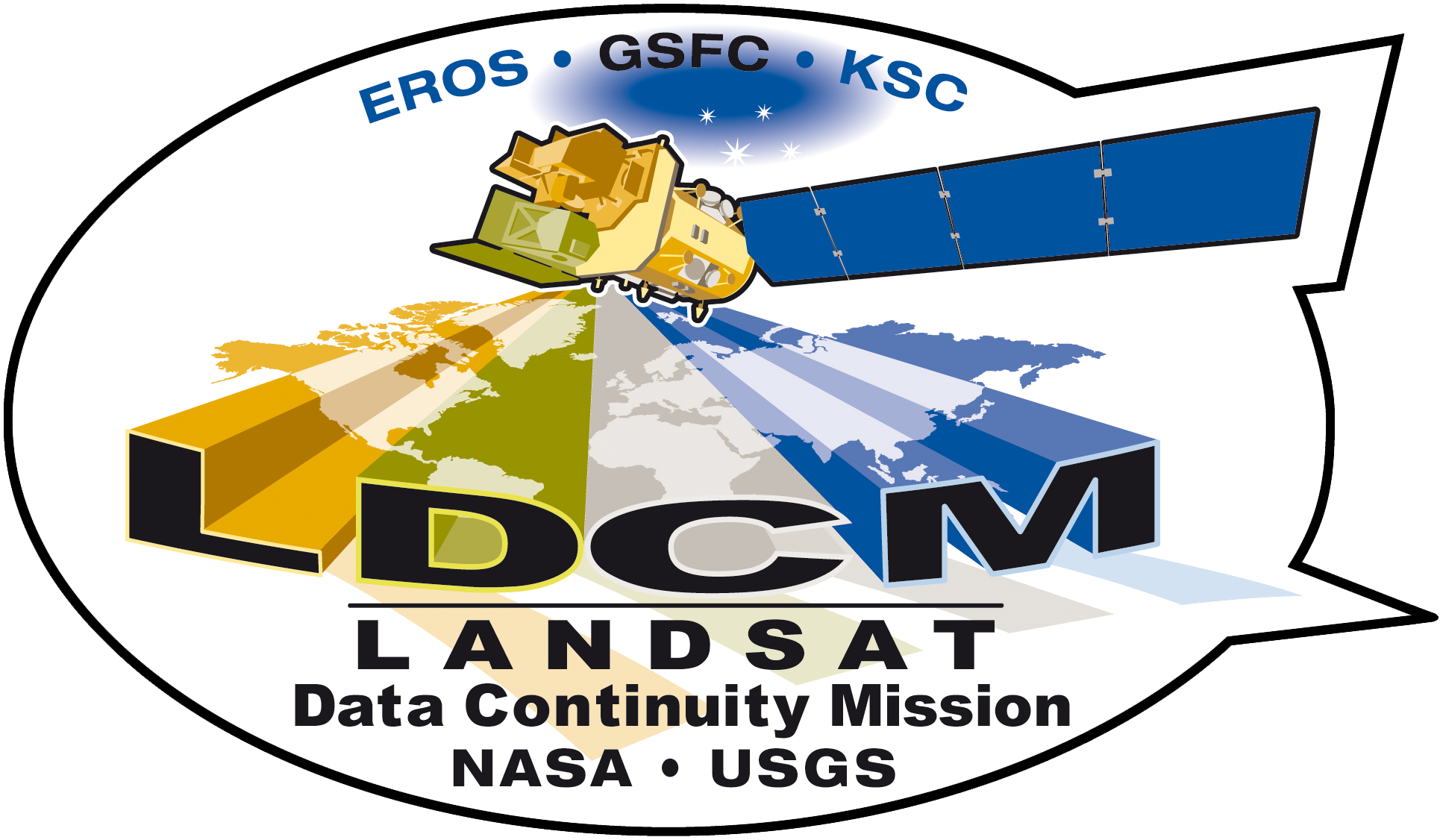
- Landsat Data Continuity Mission (LDCM) mission patch Landsat program

Landsat 8 is an American Earth observation satellite launched on 11 February 2013. It is the eighth satellite in the Landsat program and the seventh to reach orbit successfully. Originally called the Landsat Data Continuity Mission (LDCM), it is a collaboration between NASA and the United States Geological Survey (USGS). NASA Goddard Space Flight Center in Greenbelt, Maryland, provided development, mission systems engineering, and acquisition of the launch vehicle while the USGS provided for development of the ground systems and will conduct on-going mission operations. It comprises the camera of the Operational Land Imager (OLI) and the Thermal Infrared Sensor (TIRS), which can be used to study Earth surface temperature and is used to study global warming.

The satellite was built by Orbital Sciences Corporation, who served as prime contractor for the mission. The spacecraft's instruments were constructed by Ball Aerospace & Technologies and NASA's Goddard Space Flight Center (GSFC), and its launch was contracted to United Launch Alliance (ULA). During the first 108 days in orbit, LDCM underwent checkout and verification by NASA and on 30 May 2013 operations were transferred from NASA to the USGS when LDCM was officially renamed to Landsat 8.

== Mission overview ==
NASA's Earth Observing Fleet (including Landsat 8)

With Landsat 5 retiring in early 2013, leaving Landsat 7 as the only on-orbit Landsat program satellite, Landsat 8 ensures the continued acquisition and availability of Landsat data utilizing a two-sensor payload, the Operational Land Imager (OLI) and the Thermal InfraRed Sensor (TIRS). Respectively, these two instruments collect image data for nine shortwave bands and two longwave thermal bands. The satellite was developed with a 5 years mission design life but was launched with enough fuel on board to provide for upwards of ten years of operations.

Landsat 8 consists of three key mission and science objectives:

- Collect and archive medium resolution (30-meter spatial resolution) multispectral image data affording seasonal coverage of the global landmasses for a period of no less than 5 years.
- Ensure that Landsat 8 data are sufficiently consistent with data from the earlier Landsat missions in terms of acquisition geometry, calibration, coverage characteristics, spectral characteristics, output product quality, and data availability to permit studies of landcover and land-use change over time.
- Distribute Landsat 8 data products to the general public on a nondiscriminatory basis at no cost to the user.

== Technical details ==
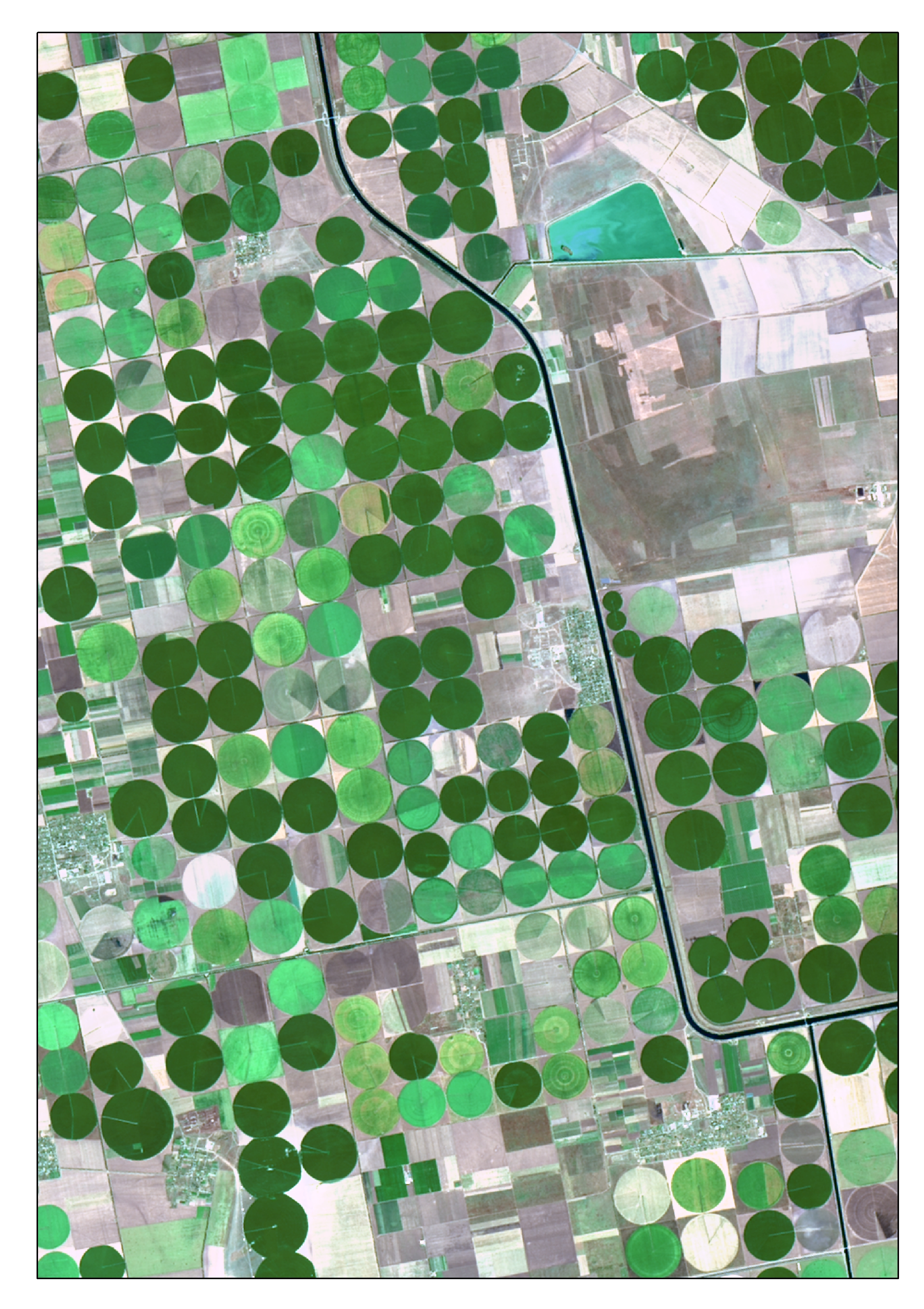
The picture is a satellite image of irrigated crops and Kahov irrigation canal. It was captured on 7 August 2015 by Landsat 8 (OLI). The image is created as a True Color Composite, where R – Red Band (0.64 - 0.67 μm), G – Green Band (0.53 - 0.59 μm) and B – Blue Band (0.45 - 0.51 μm). This band combination is suitable for crop monitoring. For emphasizing characteristics, the image was pan-sharpened by panchromatic band. Nonlinear adaptive procedure of contrasting was also applied.

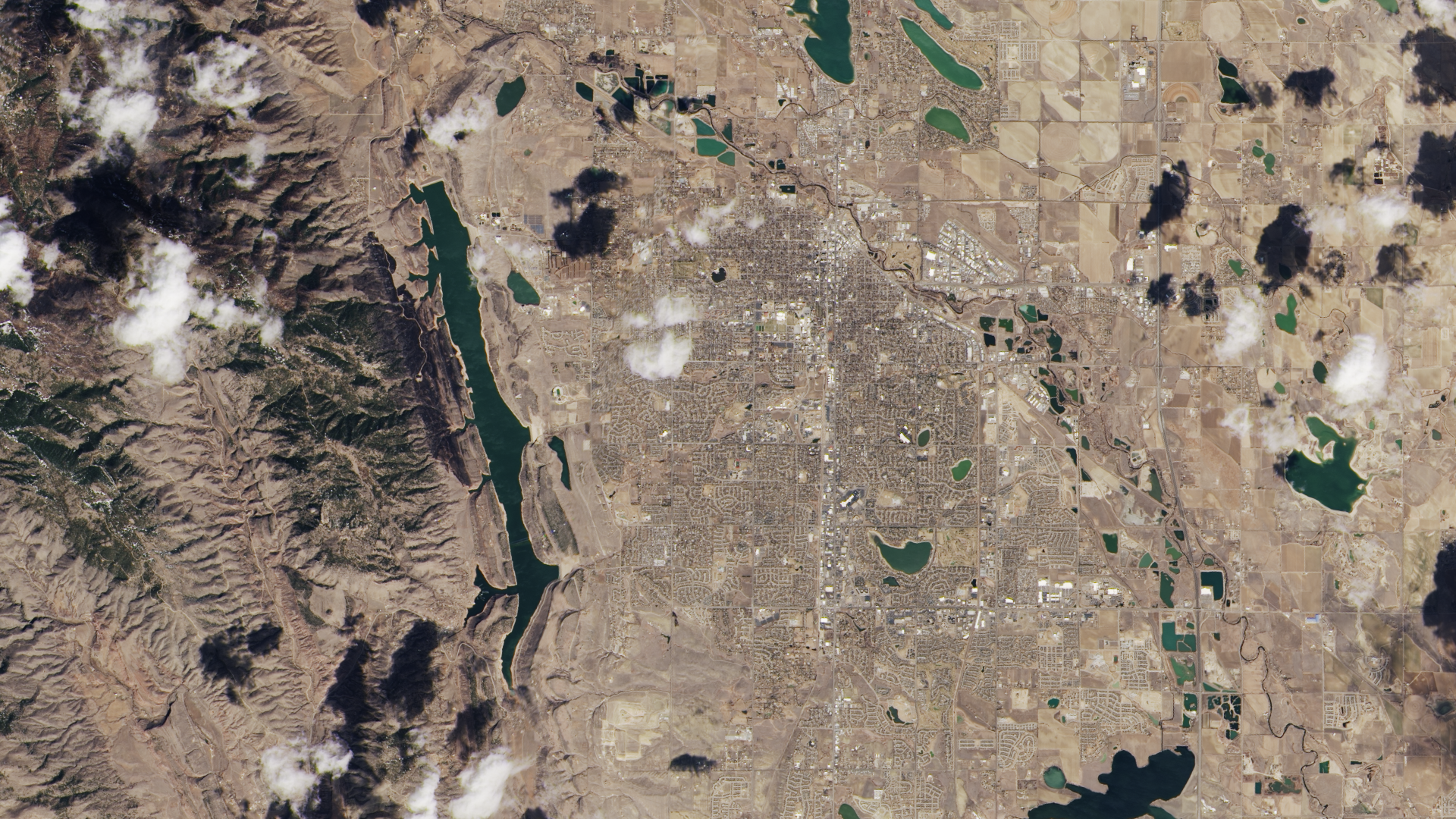
First image from Landsat 8. The area is Fort Collins, Colorado, United States and the image is shown in natural color using the Operational Land Imager (OLI) spectral bands 2 (blue), 3 (green), and 4 (red).

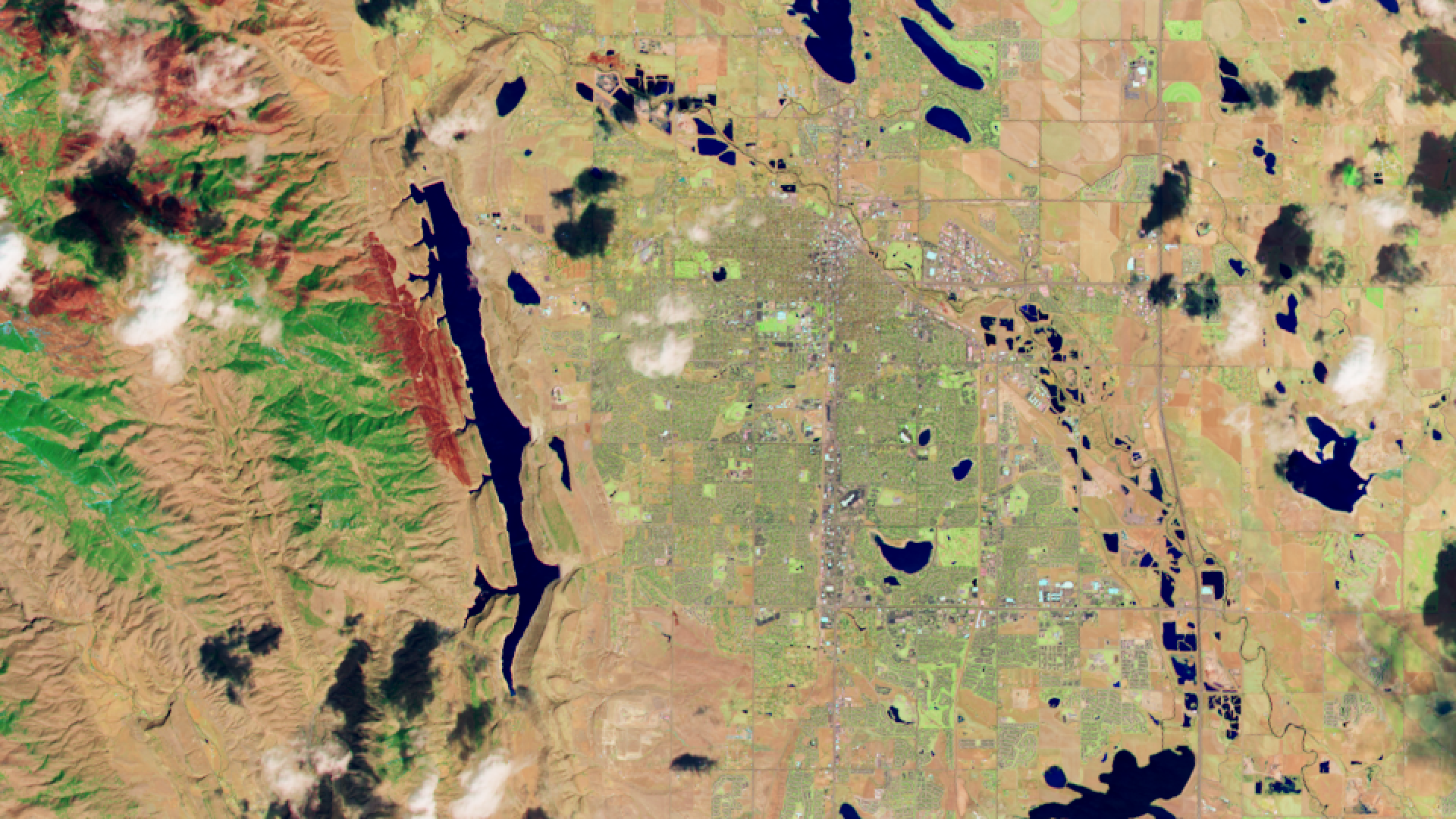
First image from Landsat 8. The area is Fort Collins, Colorado, United States and the image is from the Operational Land Imager (OLI) spectral bands 3 (green), 5 (near infrared), and 7 (short wave infrared 2) displayed as blue, green and red, respectively.

Providing moderate-resolution imagery, from 15 metres to 100 metres, of Earth's land surface and polar regions, Landsat 8 operates in the visible, near-infrared, short wave infrared, and thermal infrared spectrums. Landsat 8 captures more than 700 scenes a day, an increase from the 250 scenes a day on Landsat 7. The OLI and TIRS sensors will see improved signal to noise radiometric (SNR) performance, enabling 12-bit quantization of data allowing for more bits for better land-cover characterization.

Planned parameters for Landsat 8 standard products:

- Product type: Level 1T (terrain corrected)
- Output format: GeoTIFF
- Pixel size: 15 meters/30 meters/100 meters (panchromatic/multispectral/thermal)
- Map projection: UTM (Polar Stereographic for Antarctica)
- Datum: WGS 84
- Orientation: North-up (map)
- Resampling: Cubic convolution
- Accuracy:
  - OLI: 12 metres circular error, 90% confidence
  - TIRS: 41 metres circular error, 90% confidence

=== Spacecraft ===
The Landsat 8 spacecraft was built by Orbital Sciences Corporation, under contract to NASA, and uses Orbital's standard LEOStar-3 satellite bus. Orbital was responsible for the design and manufacture of the Landsat 8 spacecraft bus, the integration of the customer-furnished payload instruments, and full observatory testing, including environmental and EMI/EMC. The spacecraft supplies power, orbit and attitude control, communications, and data storage for OLI and TIRS.

All components, except for the propulsion module, are mounted on the exterior of the primary structure. A single deployable solar array generates power for the spacecraft components and charges the spacecraft's 125 ampere hour nickel-hydrogen (Ni-H_{2}) battery. A 3.14-terabit solid state data recorder provides data storage aboard the spacecraft and an X-band antenna transmits OLI and TIRS data either in real time or played back from the data recorder. The OLI and TIRS are mounted on an optical bench at the forward end of the spacecraft.

=== Sensors ===
==== Operational Land Imager ====
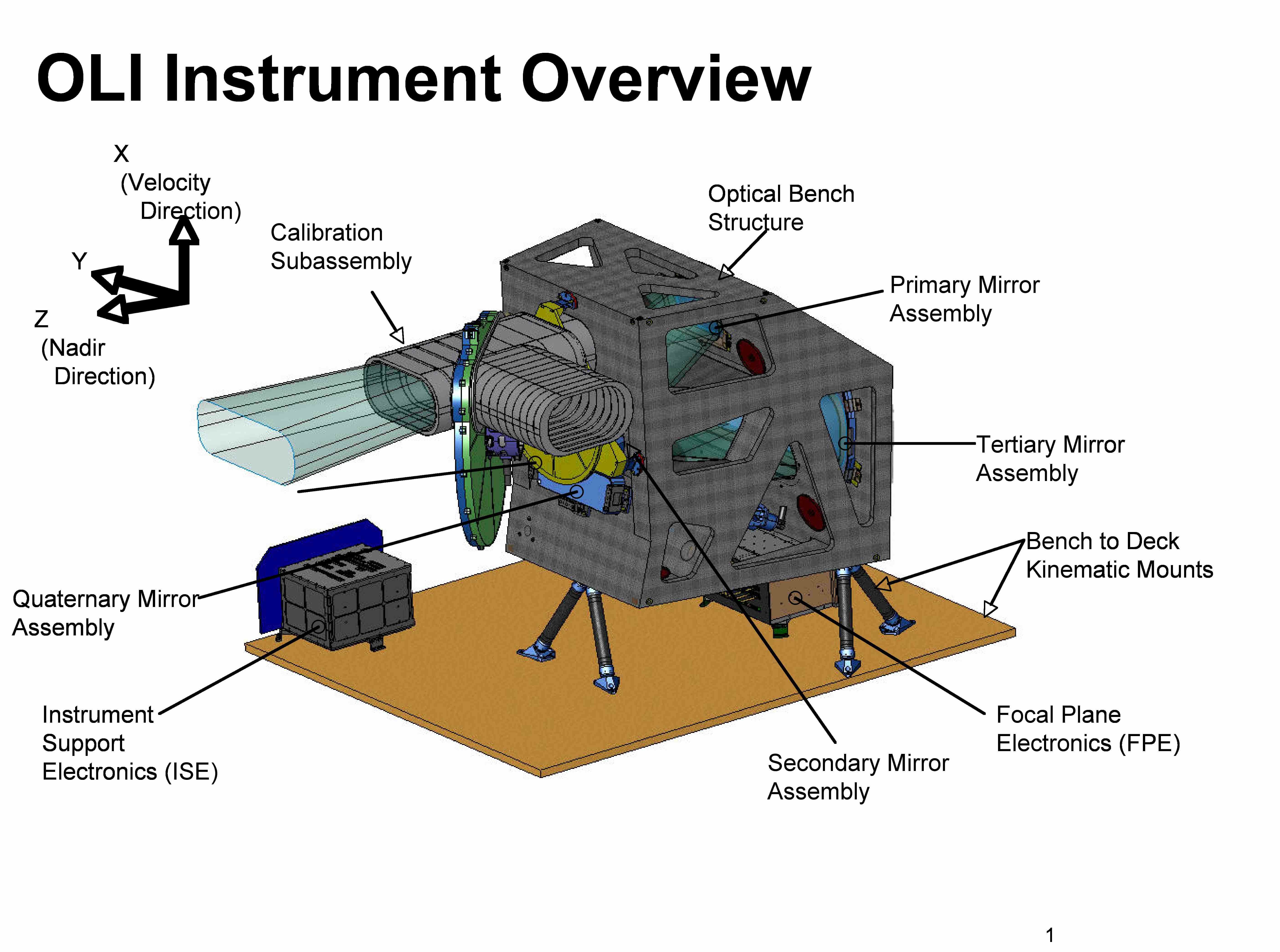

Landsat 8's Operational Land Imager (OLI) improves on past Landsat sensors and was built, under contract to NASA, by Ball Aerospace & Technologies. OLI uses a technological approach demonstrated by the Advanced Land Imager sensor flown on NASA's experimental Earth Observing-1 (EO-1) satellite. The OLI instrument uses a pushbroom sensor instead of whiskbroom sensors that were utilized on earlier Landsat satellites. The pushbroom sensor aligns the imaging detector arrays along Landsat 8's focal plane allowing it to view across the entire swath, 185 km (115 mi) cross-track field of view, as opposed to sweeping across the field of view. With over 7000 detectors per spectral band, the pushbroom design results in increased sensitivity, fewer moving parts, and improved land surface information.

OLI collects data from nine spectral bands. Seven of the nine bands are consistent with the Thematic Mapper (TM) and Enhanced Thematic Mapper Plus (ETM+) sensors found on earlier Landsat satellites, providing for compatibility with the historical Landsat data, while also improving measurement capabilities. Two new spectral bands, a deep blue coastal/aerosol band and a shortwave-infrared cirrus band, will be collected, allowing scientists to measure water quality and improve detection of high, thin clouds.

OLI Spectral Bands
Spectral Band	Description	Wavelength	Resolution
Band 1	Coastal Aerosol	0.43 - 0.45 μm	30 m
Band 2	Blue	0.450 - 0.51 μm	30 m
Band 3	Green	0.53 - 0.59 μm	30 m
Band 4	Red	0.64 - 0.67 μm	30 m
Band 5	Near-Infrared	0.85 - 0.88 μm	30 m
Band 6	SWIR 1	1.57 - 1.65 μm	30 m
Band 7	SWIR 2	2.11 - 2.29 μm	30 m
Band 8	Panchromatic (PAN)	0.50 - 0.68 μm	15 m
Band 9	Cirrus	1.36 - 1.38 μm	30 m

==== Thermal InfraRed Sensor ====
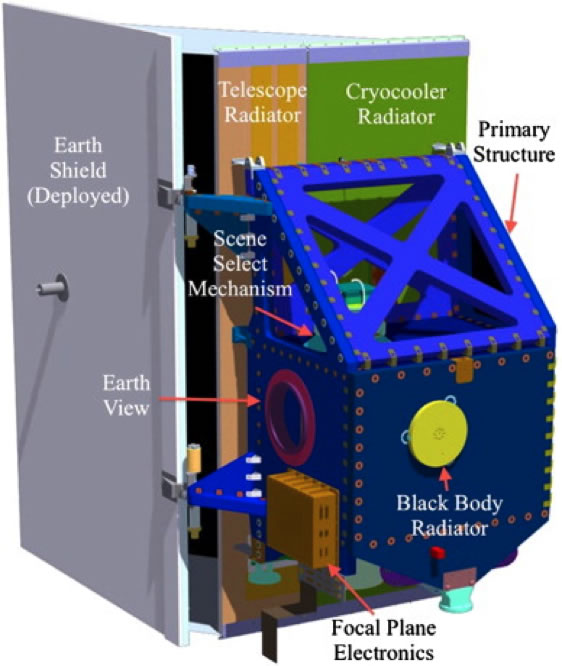
Thermal Infrared Sensor Design

The Thermal InfraRed Sensor (TIRS), built by the NASA Goddard Space Flight Center, conducts thermal imaging and supports emerging applications such as evapotranspiration rate measurements for water management. The TIRS focal plane uses gallium arsenide (GaAs) Quantum Well Infrared Photodetector arrays (known as QWIPs) for detecting the infrared radiation — a first for the Landsat program. The TIRS data will be registered to OLI data to create radiometrically, geometrically, and terrain-corrected 12-bit Landsat 8 data products. Like OLI, TIRS employs a pushbroom sensor design with a 185 km swath width. Data for two long wavelength infrared bands will be collected with TIRS. This provides data continuity with Landsat 7's single thermal infrared band and adds a second.

With TIRS being a late addition to the Landsat 8 satellite, the design life requirement was relaxed in order to expedite development of the sensor. As such, TIRS only has a three-year design life.

TIRS Spectral Bands
Spectral Band	Description	Wavelength	Resolution
Band 10	Thermal infrared 1	10.60 – 11.19 μm	100 m
Band 11	Thermal infrared 2	11.50 – 12.51 μm	100 m

=== Ground system ===
The Landsat 8 ground system performs two main functions: command and control of the satellite and management of mission data sent from the satellite. Satellite command and control is provided by the Mission Operations Center at Goddard Space Flight Center (NASA). Commands are sent from the Mission Operations Center to the satellite via a Ground Network Element (GNE). Mission data from the satellite is downlinked to receiving stations in Sioux Falls, South Dakota, Gilmore Creek, Arkansas, and Svalbard, Norway. From there, the data is sent via the GNE to the USGS Center for Earth Resources Observation and Science (EROS) in Sioux Falls, where it is ingested into the Data Processing and Archive System.

== History ==
The original Landsat 8 plans called for NASA to purchase data meeting Landsat 8 specifications from a commercially owned and operated satellite system; however, after an evaluation of proposals received from industry, NASA cancelled the Request for Proposals in September 2003. In August 2004, a memorandum from the White House Office of Science and Technology Policy (OSTP) directed Federal agencies to place Landsat-type sensors on the National Polar-orbiting Operational Environmental Satellite System (NPOESS) platform. Following an evaluation of the technical complexity of this task, the strategy was adjusted and on 23 December 2005, the OSTP issued a memorandum directing NASA to implement the Landsat 8 in the form of a free-flyer spacecraft carrying an instrument referred to as the Operational Land Imager (OLI). In December 2009, a decision was made to add a thermal infrared sensor (TIRS) to the mission payload. On 7 October 2022 the satellite was imaged on orbit by WorldView-3.

=== Launch ===
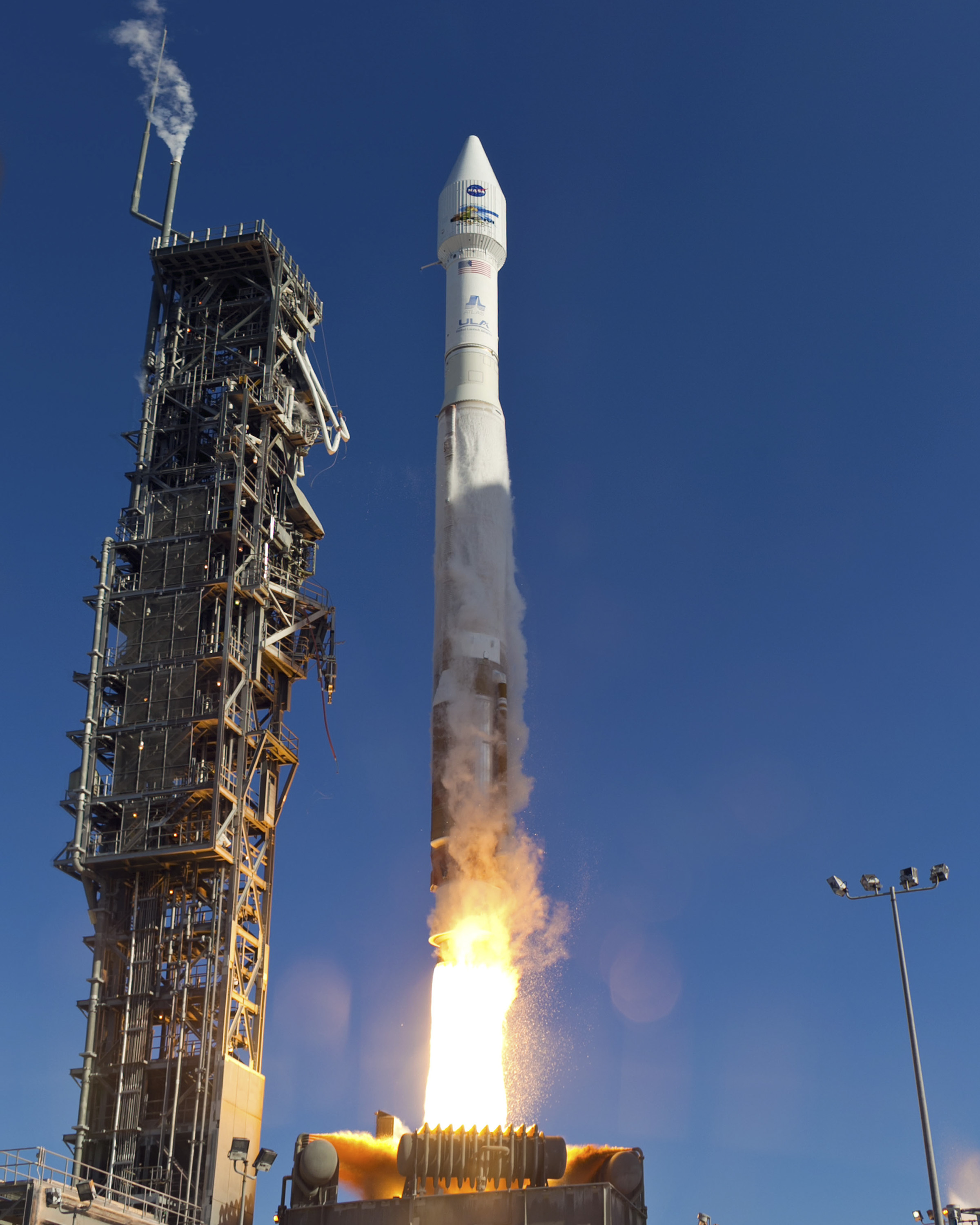
Landsat 8 launches atop an Atlas V.

The satellite was launched aboard an Atlas 401 launch vehicle with an Extended Payload Fairing. The launch took place at 18:02:00 UTC on 11 February 2013, from Vandenberg Space Launch Complex 3 (SLC-3E) at Vandenberg Air Force Base. Seventy eight minutes and thirty seconds later, the spacecraft separated from the Atlas V upper stage, successfully completing the launch.

First images from the spacecraft were collected on 18 March 2013. Landsat 8 joins Landsat 7 on-orbit, providing increased coverage of the Earth's surface.

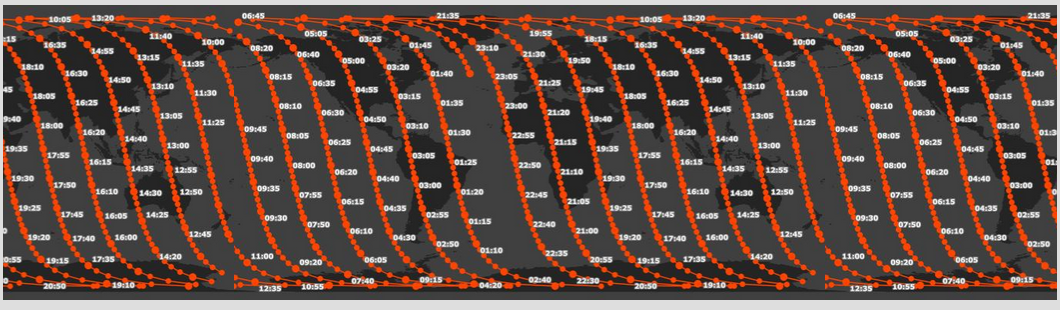
Landsat 8's ascending orbital path

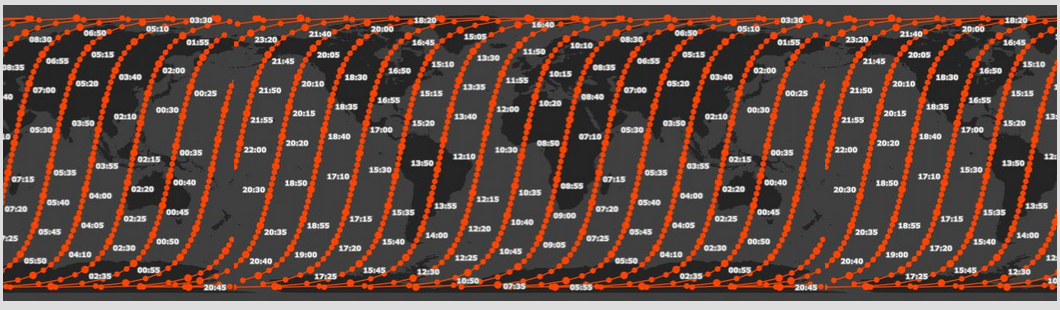
Landsat 8's descending orbital path

=== On orbit problems with TIRS ===
On 19 December 2014, ground controllers detected anomalous current levels associated with the Scene Select Mirror (SSM) encoder electronics. The SSM electronics were turned off with the instrument pointed at nadir and TIRS data was acquired but not processed. On 3 March 2015, operators switched TIRS from the A side to B side electronics to deal with the issue with the A side encoder electronics. TIRS resumed normal operations on 4 March 2015, and nominal blackbody and deep space calibration data collection resumed on 7 March 2015.

On 3 November 2015, the ability of TIRS to accurately measure the location of the Scene Select Mirror (SSM) was compromised and the encoder was powered off. In April 2016, an algorithm was developed to compensate for the powered off encoder and data reporting resumed. In addition to these problems, TIRS launched with a stray light anomaly that increases the reported temperature by up to 4 Kelvin in band 10 and up to 8 K in band 11. Eventually, it was determined that the anomaly was caused by out-of-field reflections bouncing off a metal alloy retaining ring mounted just above the third lens of the four-lens refractive TIRS telescope and onto the TIRS focal plane. In January 2017, an algorithm was developed to estimate the amount of stray light and subtract it from the data, reducing the error down to about 1 K.

== Landsat Changes ==
In 2020, Landsat 9 joined the fleet and in 2025 Landsat 7 was decommissioned.

== See also ==
- Landsat program
- Sentinel-2
