= Virginia Norwood =

American physicist (1927–2023)

Virginia Tower Norwood
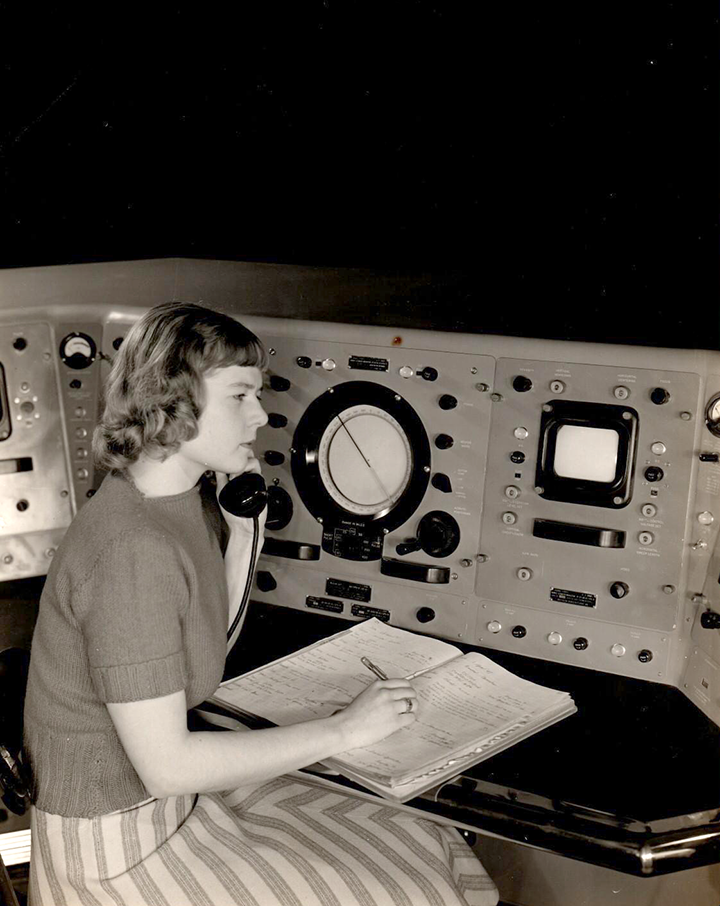
- Norwood in 1950
- Born: Virginia Tower; January 8, 1927; New York City, New York, U.S.
- Died: March 26, 2023 (aged 96); Topanga, California, U.S.
- Education: Massachusetts Institute of Technology (BS)
- Occupations: Aerospace Engineer; inventor; physicist
- Known for: Contribution to Landsat Program; "The Mother of Landsat"
- Spouses: Larry Norwood (m. 1947, divorced); Maurice Schaeffer (died 2010)
- Children: 3

Virginia Tower Norwood (January 8, 1927 – March 26, 2023) was an American aerospace engineer, inventor, and physicist. She was best known for her contribution to the Landsat program, having designed the Multispectral Scanner which was first used on Landsat 1. She has been called "The Mother of Landsat" for this work.

== Early life and education ==
Virginia Tower was born on January 8, 1927, at Fort Totten in New York City, United States the eldest daughter of Eleanor Monroe and John Vogler Tower. He was an Army officer, had a master's degree in physics, and later taught at Carnegie Tech. Her mother was skilled in mathematics and languages and studied independently. Her father actively encouraged young Virginia's interest in physics and mathematics; he gave her a slide rule when she was nine years old, and helped to develop her mathematical skills. The family moved around with her father's military career, living in Panama, Oklahoma, and Bermuda. Once military families were sent back to the American mainland following the attack on Pearl Harbor in December 1941, she was a pupil at five high schools. In 1943, her guidance counselor in high school suggested she become a librarian due to her intelligence, but she was much more interested in numbers than words.

Norwood was accepted into the Massachusetts Institute of Technology with a partial scholarship in 1944. She graduated in 1947 with a degree in mathematical physics.

While working at the United States Army Signal Corps in New Jersey, she took engineering classes through a Rutgers University extension programme.

== Career ==
A year after graduation from MIT she was hired by the U.S. Army Signal Corps Laboratories in Fort Monmouth, New Jersey. She began working on weather radar. While there, she designed a radar reflector for weather balloons before progressing to work on microwave antenna design.

After five years at the Signal Corps she moved to Los Angeles and began working for Hughes Aircraft Company. She worked there for 36 years on a range of projects that included antenna design, communications links, optics, and the Landsat scanners. During that period she designed the microwave transmitter that Surveyor 1 used to transmit data and images back to earth.

Norwood designed a six-band multispectral scanner for use on the first Landsat mission. Due to mission constraints the prototype was revised to use only four bands. The Multispectral Scanner, as it was known, was carried on Landsat 1. An improved seven band version, known as the Thematic Mapper was later included on Landsat 4.

Norwood retired in 1989. A biographical article published by NASA in 2020 referred to her as "The Mother of Landsat".

=== Patents ===
Norwood filed and held three patents. Two of them are a radar reflector designed to track weather balloons and a novel folded tracking antenna.

- US patent 2746035A, Virginia T Norwood, "Radar reflector", issued May 15, 1956
- US patent 3143737A, Virginia T Norwood, "Folded sigma-shaped dipole antenna", issued August 4, 1964

== Awards ==
In 1979, Norwood received the William T. Pecora Award. The award recognizes achievements in the scientific and technical remote sensing community, as well as contributions leading to successful practical applications of remote sensing. The award is sponsored jointly by the U.S. Department of the Interior and the National Aeronautics and Space Administration.

In 2021, Norwood was given an Honorary Lifetime Achievement Award by the American Society for Photogrammetry and Remote Sensing, the highest honour that society bestows on any individual.

Norwood was elected to the National Academy of Engineering in February 2023 and in 2025 posthumously inducted into the National Inventors Hall of Fame.

== Personal life ==
Virginia Tower married Lawrence Russell Norwood, her third-semester calculus instructor and the president of the MIT mathematics club. They married on the day after she completed her bachelor's degree in mathematics. They had three children before divorcing. She went on to marry Maurice Schaeffer.

Norwood died at her home in Topanga, California, on March 26, 2023, at age 96.
