= Landsat 7 =

American earth observation satellite (1999–2025)

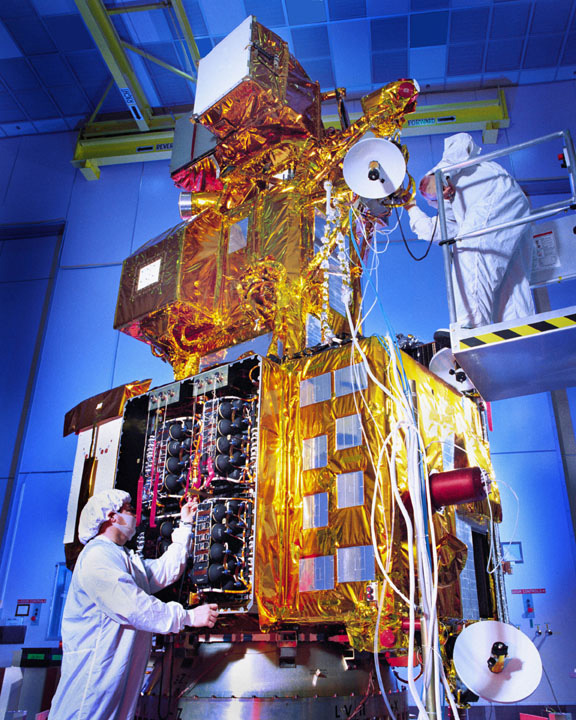
- Landsat 7 before launch
- Mission type: Satellite imagery
- Operator: NASA / USGS
- COSPAR ID: 1999-020A
- SATCAT no.: 25682
- Mission duration: 5 years (planned); 26 years, 1 month, 20 days (final)

Spacecraft properties
- Bus: TIROS-N
- Manufacturer: Lockheed Martin Space Systems
- Launch mass: 1,973 kg (4,350 lb)
- Dimensions: 2.74 × 2.74 × 4.04 m (9.0 × 9.0 × 13.3 ft)
- Power: 1550 watts

Start of mission
- Launch date: 15 April 1999, 18:32:00 UTC
- Rocket: Delta II 7920–10; D-268
- Launch site: Vandenberg, SLC-2W
- Contractor: Boeing
- Entered service: 1999

End of mission
- Disposal: Decommissioned
- Last contact: 4 June 2025, 18:08 UTC

Orbital parameters
- Reference system: Geocentric orbit
- Regime: Sun-synchronous orbit
- Altitude: 705 km
- Inclination: 98.21°
- Period: 98.83 minutes
- Repeat interval: 16 days
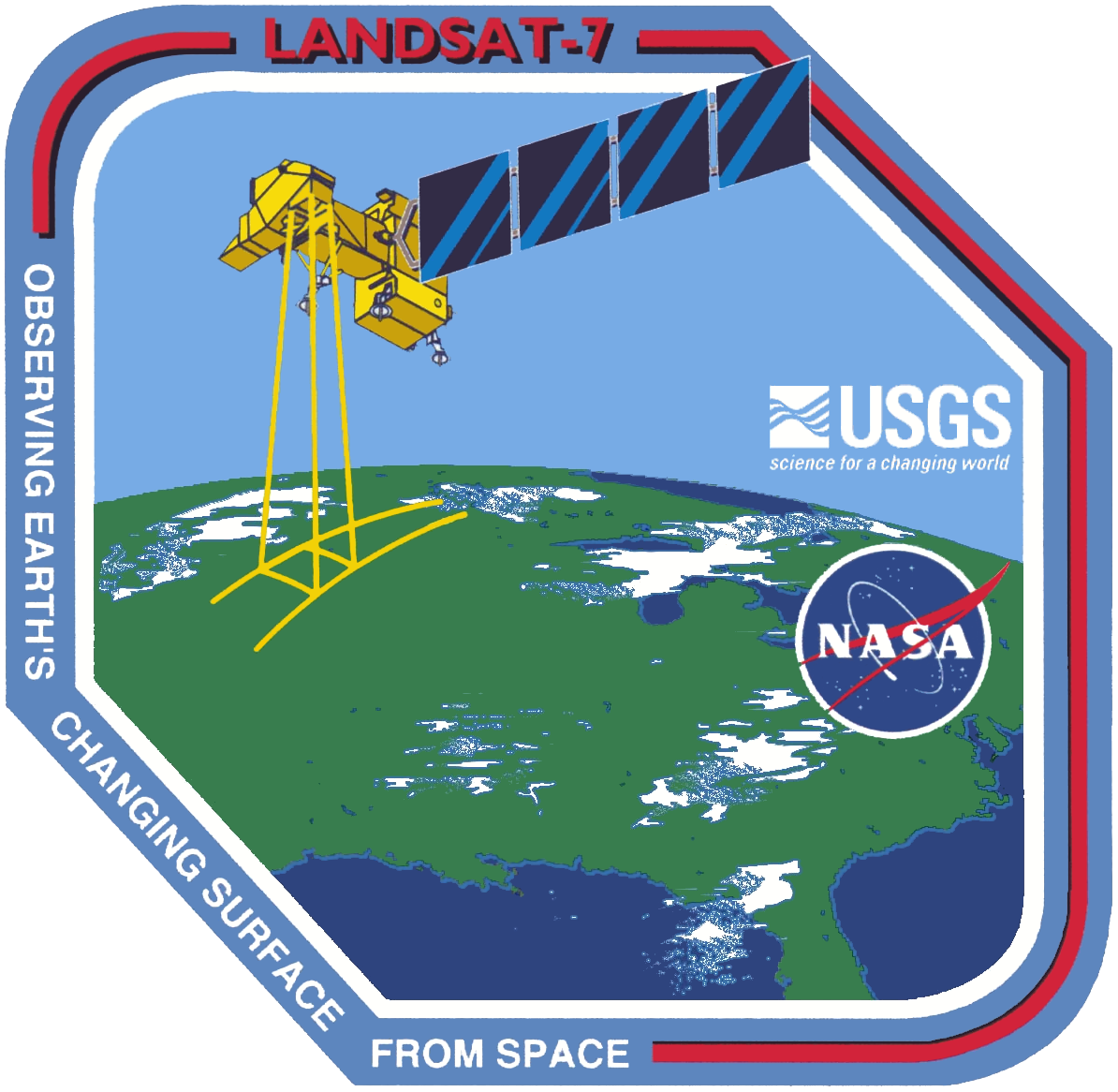
- Landsat program

Landsat 7 is the seventh satellite of the Landsat program. Launched on 15 April 1999, Landsat 7's primary goal is to refresh the global archive of satellite photos, providing up-to-date and cloud-free images. The Landsat program is managed and operated by the United States Geological Survey, and data from Landsat 7 is collected and distributed by the USGS. The NASA WorldWind project allows 3D images from Landsat 7 and other sources to be freely navigated and viewed from any angle. The satellite's companion, Earth Observing-1, trailed by one minute and followed the same orbital characteristics, but in 2011 its fuel was depleted and EO-1's orbit began to degrade. Landsat 7 was built by Lockheed Martin Space Systems.

In 2016, NASA announced it planned to attempt the first ever refueling of a live satellite by refueling Landsat 7 in 2020 with the OSAM-1 mission. However after multiple delays, NASA announced the cancellation of OSAM-1 in March 2024. The mission officially ended in 2025.

== Satellite specifications ==
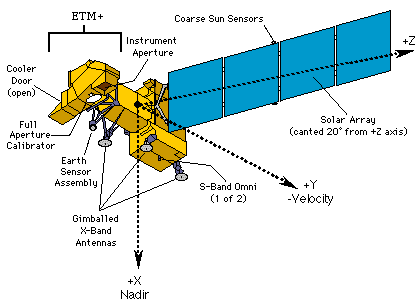
Landsat 7 Schematic

Landsat 7 was designed to last for five years, and has the capacity to collect and transmit up to 532 images per day. It is in a polar, Sun-synchronous orbit, meaning it scans across the entire Earth's surface. With an altitude of 705 km (438 mi), it takes 232 orbits, or 16 days, to do so. The satellite weighs 1,973 kg (4,350 lb), is 4.04 m long, and 2.74 m in diameter. Unlike its predecessors, Landsat 7 has a solid-state memory of 378 Gbits (roughly 100 images). The main instrument on board Landsat 7 is the Enhanced Thematic Mapper Plus (ETM+), a whisk broom scanner image sensor.

== Instruments ==
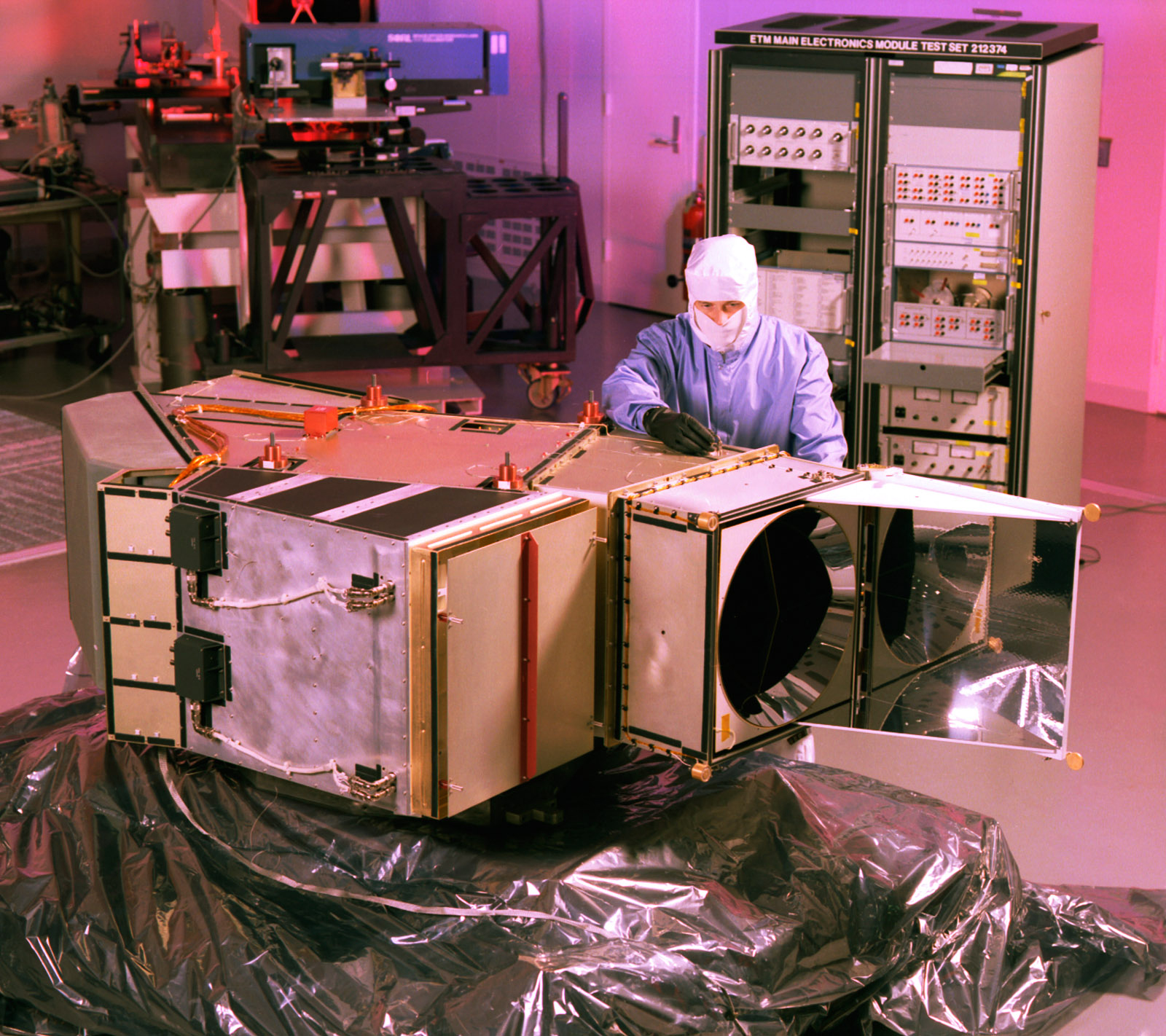
Enhanced Thematic Mapper Plus (ETM+)

- A panchromatic band with 15 metre spatial resolution (band 8)
- Visible (reflected light) bands in the spectrum of blue, green, red, near-infrared (NIR), and mid-infrared (MIR) with 30 metre spatial resolution (bands 1–5, 7)
- A thermal infrared channel with 60 metre spatial resolution (band 6)
- Full aperture, 5% absolute radiometric calibration

== Scan Line Corrector failure ==
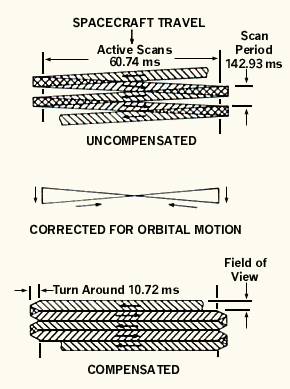
The effect of the SLC on ETM+ scans.

On 31 May 2003, the Scan Line Corrector (SLC) in the ETM+ instrument failed. The SLC consists of a pair of small mirrors that rotate about an axis in tandem with the motion of the main ETM+ scan mirror. The purpose of the SLC is to compensate for the forward motion (along-track) of the spacecraft so that the resulting scans are aligned parallel to each other. Without the effects of the SLC, the instrument images the Earth in a "zig-zag" fashion, resulting in some areas that are imaged twice and others that are not imaged at all. The net effect is that approximately 22% of the data in a Landsat 7 scene is missing when acquired without a functional SLC.

A month after the SLC failure, the USGS compiled an assessment of the degraded data produced with the failed SLC. The assessment included input from scientists from USGS, NASA, and the Landsat 7 science team, and concluded that the results were still usable for many scientific applications and that there were several potential approaches to compensate for the missing data.

== Satellite imagery ==
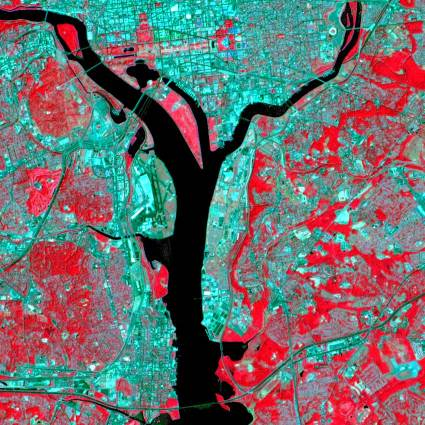
False color IR image of Washington, D.C., taken by Landsat 7.

In August 1998, NASA contracted EarthSat to produce Landsat GeoCover (Geocover 2000 in NASA WorldWind) — a positionally accurate orthorectified Landsat Thematic Mapper and Multispectral Scanner imagery covering the majority of the Earth's land mass. The contract was part of the NASA Scientific Data Purchase which was administrated through NASA's John C. Stennis Space Center. GeoCover was later enhanced to EarthSat NaturalVue, a simulated natural color Landsat 7 derived circa year 2000, orthorectified, mosaicked and color balanced digital image dataset. Other commercial simulated true color 15-metre global imagery products built from the NASA Landsat 7 imagery include TerraColor from Earthstar Geographics, TruEarth (found in Google Earth and Google Maps) from TerraMetrics, BrightEarth from ComputaMaps, simulated natural color from Atlogis and a product of i-cubed used in NASA WorldWind.

Large parts of the Earth surface displayed on web mapping services like Google Maps / Google Earth, MSN Maps or Yahoo! Maps are based on enhanced and color balanced Landsat 7 imagery.

== Orbit lowering ==
Landsat 7 required regular orbital maneuvers to ensure that the local mean time (LMT) data acquisitions were maintained. The final such maneuver took place on February 7, 2017. From that point forward, the satellite's orbit began to slowly degrade (lower) such that by 2021 it had faded from the desired 10:00 AM LMT to about 9:15 AM.

With the 27 September 2021 launch of Landsat 9, Landsat 7 was to be decommissioned. Its orbit has degraded such that Landsat 9 can move into the 705-km ) "standard" orbit altitude, and take Landsat 7's place in an orbit that allows data to be collected eight days out of phase with Landsat 8 (with two satellites in orbit, a Landsat scene is collected over every location on Earth every eight days). Landsat 7's 9:15 AM LMT acquisition will preclude acquiring high-quality and heritage-continuing data.

On 6 April 2022, the science mission was suspended and the image sensor was placed into standby mode as the satellite's orbit was lowered.

NASA explored the possibility of using their robotic servicing mission OSAM-1 to refuel Landsat 7, primarily to ensure successful decommissioning, but also to provide the possibility of turning the satellite into a transfer radiometer. This could have allowed it to act as a calibration instrument for Landsats 8 and 9, and perhaps even extend its scientific utility. This plan ended with the cancellation of OSAM-1 in 2024.

On 5 May 2022, imaging was once again resumed, to assess the utility of imagery collected at the new lower orbit and earlier equatorial crossing time.

On 4 June 2025, the spacecraft was shut down marking its mission end.

== See also ==
- Google Earth
- NASA WorldWind
- Virtual globe
- UNIFORM-1
