= Multispectral Scanner =

Earth observing sensor

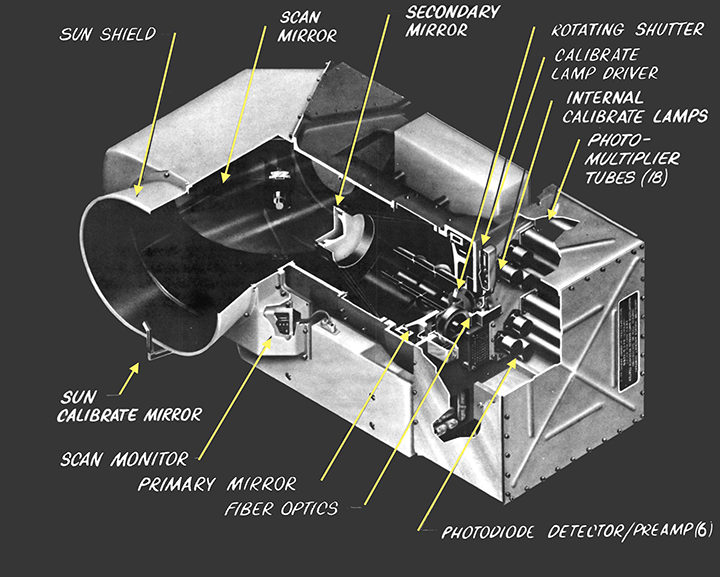
MSS diagram

The Multispectral Scanner (MSS) is one of the Earth's observing sensors introduced in the Landsat program. A Multispectral Scanner was placed aboard each of the first five Landsat satellites.

The scanner was designed at Hughes Aerospace by Virginia Norwood. Her design called for a six band scanner, but the first one launched had only four bands. For her work on the design Norwood is called "The Mother of Landsat."

== MSS technical specifications ==
Sensor type	Spatial resolution	Spectral range	Number of bands	Temporal resolution	Image size	Swath
opto-mechanical	68 m X 83 m (or 57 m)	0.5 - 1.1 μm	4, 5 (Landsat 3 only)	18 days (L1-L3), 16 days (L4 & L5)	185 km X 185 km	185 km
