= Landsat 6 =

American earth observation satellite

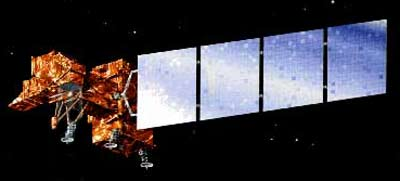
- Mission type: Earth imaging
- Operator: NASA / NOAA
- COSPAR ID: 1993-F04
- Mission duration: Failed to orbit

Spacecraft properties
- Bus: TIROS-N
- Manufacturer: Martin Marietta
- Launch mass: 2,750 kg (6,060 lb)
- Power: 1259 watts

Start of mission
- Launch date: October 5, 1993
- Rocket: Titan II(23)G/Star-37XFP-ISS
- Launch site: Vandenberg AFB SLC-4W

Orbital parameters
- Reference system: Geocentric
- Regime: Sun-synchronous
- Perigee altitude: 705 kilometres (438 mi)
- Apogee altitude: 705 kilometres (438 mi)
- Inclination: 98.3°
- Period: 98.9 minutes
- Epoch: Planned

Landsat 6, equipped with upgraded versions of the instruments on Landsat 5, was designed to carry forward the Landsat program. It was launched on October 5, 1993, with a Titan II launch vehicle, but failed to reach orbit. Landsat 6 omitted the Multi-Spectral Scanner found on its predecessors, but carried an Enhanced Thematic Mapper, which improved on the previous Thematic Mapper by adding a 15m-resolution panchromatic band.

== Development ==
The Landsat 6 satellite was built by Martin Marietta Astro Space.

== Design ==
=== Operations ===
The satellite was constructed from aluminum and used graphite struts. Landsat 6 had a hydrazine propulsion system. The spacecraft was powered by one solar array that had single-axis articulation and produced 1430 W. The power was stored in two NiCd batteries that had a capacity of 100 Ah. Data collected from the sensors was stored on tapes and transmitted to ground stations at 85 Mbit/s. The satellite was stabilized to 0.1 degrees in all three axes by using reaction wheels.

=== Sensors ===
The Enhanced Thematic Mapper was designed and manufactured by Santa Barbara Research Center.

== Mission ==
=== Launch ===
Landsat 6 was launched aboard a Titan II launch vehicle from Vandenberg Air Force Base on October 5, 1993.

=== Operations ===
Landsat 6 separated from the Titan II launch vehicle as programmed, but an explosion in its liquid fuel system upon separation doomed the satellite. Martin Marietta and NOAA both convened review boards to investigate the failure. Both boards determined that Landsat 6 did not achieve orbit due to a ruptured hydrazine manifold, and recommended a task force to investigate hydrazine feed systems that were considered "safe and failure-free".
