= Operational Land Imager =

Sensing instrument aboard the Landsat 8 satellite orbiting Earth

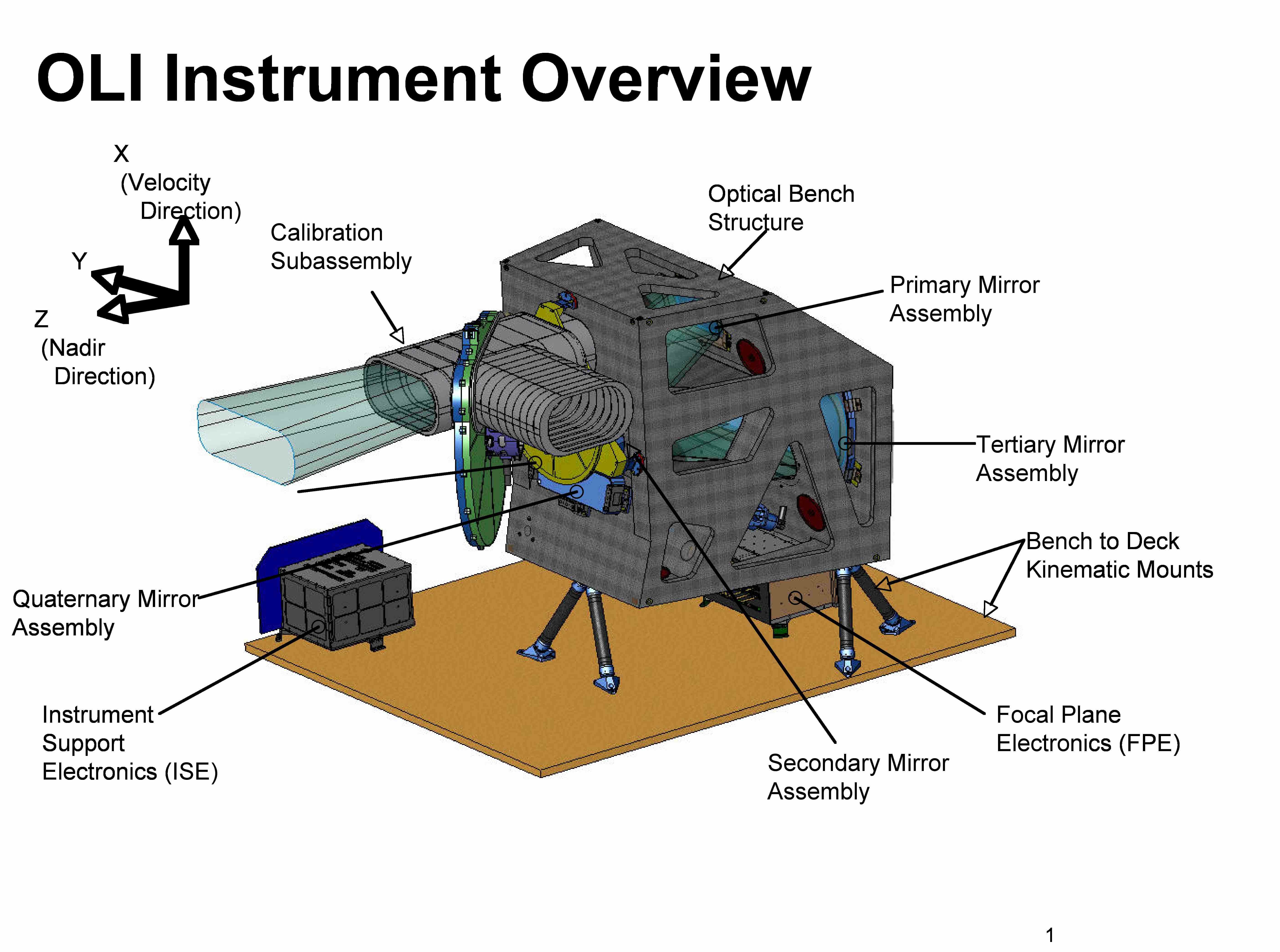
OLI structure

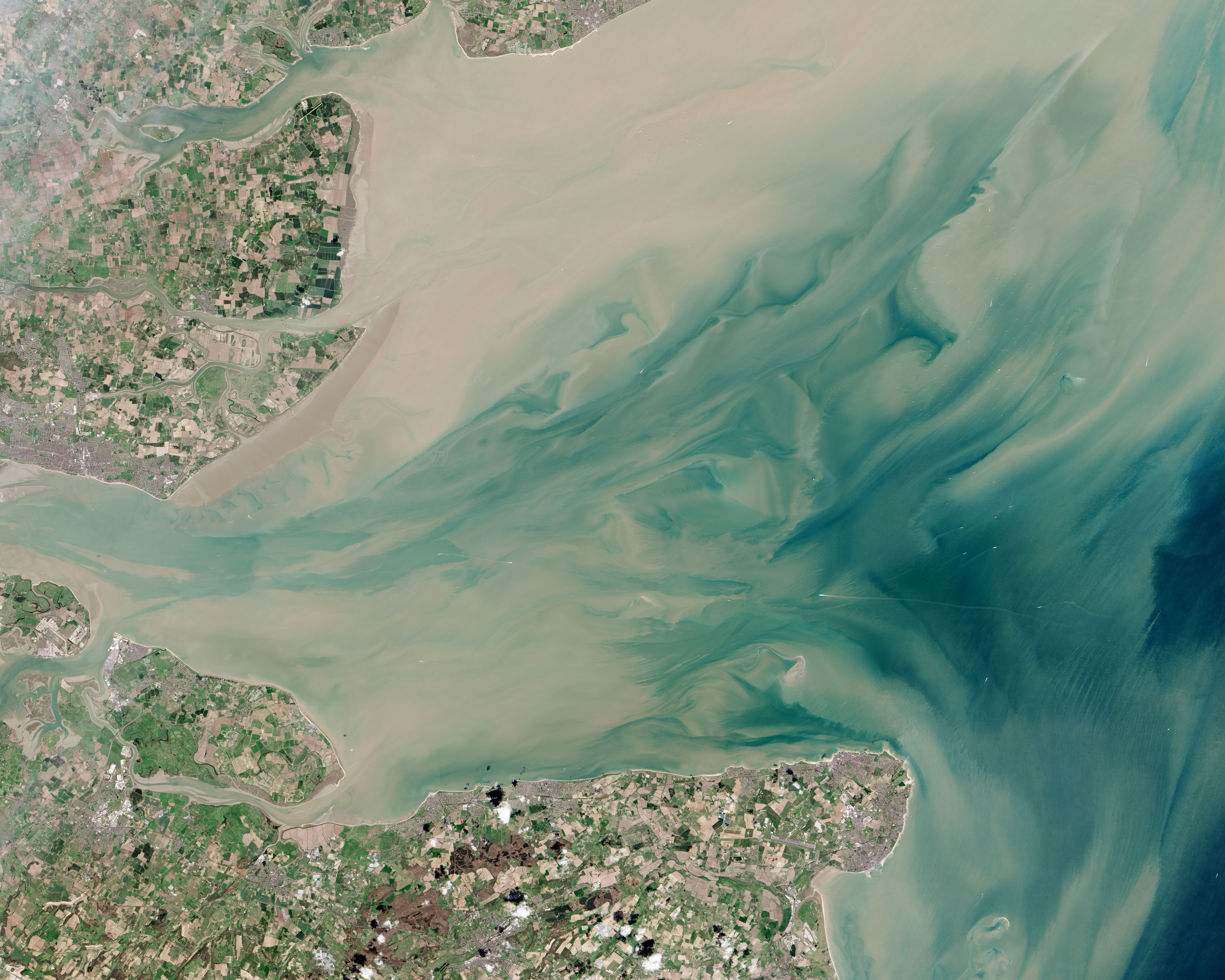
Satellite image of the Thames Estuary taken by OLI

The Operational Land Imager (OLI) is a remote sensing instrument aboard Landsat 8, built by Ball Aerospace & Technologies. Landsat 8 is the successor to Landsat 7 and was launched on February 11, 2013.

OLI is a push broom scanner that uses a four-mirror telescope with fixed mirrors.

== Overview and mission ==
OLI operates alongside TIRS (Thermal Infrared Sensor) on board the LDCM. The build and design of OLI differs from previous generations of instruments, while still maintaining data continuity with archived Landsat data from the last 40 years by keeping the same spectral and spatial resolutions of previous instruments.

OLI aids the Landsat-8 mission in the imaging of Earth's surface and the collection of moderate resolution data that is used to monitor changing trends on the surface and evaluate how land usage changes over time. The images and data that OLI has helped collect have practical applications today in agriculture, mapping, and monitoring changes in snow, ice, and water.

== Specifications and design ==
OLI is a pushbroom sensor that operates in the visible (VIS) and short wave infrared (SWIR) spectral regions. It has a swath width of 185-kilometer (115 mi), which means it can image the entire Earth over a repeating cycle of 16 days. The OLI has nine spectral bands, including a panchromatic band:

OLI Spectral Bands
Spectral Band	Description	Wavelength	Resolution
Band 1	Coastal Aerosol	0.43 - 0.45 μm	30 m
Band 2	Blue	0.450 - 0.51 μm	30 m
Band 3	Green	0.53 - 0.59 μm	30 m
Band 4	Red	0.64 - 0.67 μm	30 m
Band 5	Near-Infrared	0.85 - 0.88 μm	30 m
Band 6	SWIR 1	1.57 - 1.65 μm	30 m
Band 7	SWIR 2	2.11 - 2.29 μm	30 m
Band 8	Panchromatic (PAN)	0.50 - 0.68 μm	15 m
Band 9	Cirrus	1.36 - 1.38 μm	30 m

While the spectral and spatial resolution of OLI's channels were kept the same as prior instruments in order to maintain data continuity with the entire Landsat archive, two spectral bands (the first a blue visible channel and the second an infrared channel) were added. These bands were designated as band 1 and band 9, and serve as an enhancement from previous instruments, which lacked these channels. Band 1 was created to locate and determine water resources and investigate coastal areas, and band 9 serves a unique purpose of detecting cirrus clouds.

== Applications ==
OLI has several different applications due to the many different bands. Band 1 is helpful in imaging shallow water resources and tracking aerosols. Bands 2, 3, and 4 are in the visible spectrum and are helpful in creating true color composite images. Band 5 is helpful for ecology purposes and can help determine vegetation index or NDVI. Bands 6 and 7 are useful in geology and can help in distinguishing different saturated and unsaturated rocks and soils. Band 8 is helpful in creating images with very high resolution and precision. Band 9 is used for detecting different types of clouds.
