= Jackie Hudson =

Catholic nun and anti-nuclear activist (1934–2011)

Sister Jackie Hudson, while in prison in 2010

Jacqueline Marie Hudson OP, (November 19, 1934 – August 3, 2011) was an American Dominican sister and anti-nuclear activist. She spent the first 29 years of her working career as a music teacher. After her retirement from education, she dedicated her life to anti-war activism, during the course of which her actions led her to be arrested several times. In 2011, after a decline in her health in prison, Hudson died from multiple myeloma at the age of 76.

== Early life, education, and career ==
Born in Saginaw, Michigan, she was the younger of two children. Her father had studied in a seminary for a time and both her parents were very religious. Hudson was raised in the Roman Catholic faith and attended Catholic schools for her entire education. In 1952, at the age of 18, she decided to join the Dominican Sisters of Grand Rapids.

After her initial formation as a member of her religious congregation, Hudson was permitted to attend VanderCook College of Music, concentrating in music and religious education. This led to a nearly three decade long career as a music teacher at a series of Roman Catholic junior high schools in Michigan, where she taught piano and band as well as vocal music. Throughout this time, she also sang in a musical group composed of other Dominican Sisters, known as the Mellow D's.

== Activism ==
After her retirement in the early 1980s, Hudson started to study the effects of nuclear bombs and radiation on the environment and people; because of what she found, she subsequently focused her ministry on peace and protesting nuclear proliferation. In 1983, she protested the introduction of nuclear cruise missiles to Michigan. In 1990, she was arrested and imprisoned for 6 months for illegally accessing a bunker on Wurtsmith Air Force Base and painting "Christ lives, Disarm" on the side of it. Hudson had a strong belief that she was doing the right thing and living out her faith, and stated that "[Jesus] put life before the law." In this, she was acting upon a determination by her congregation that the members were free to take social stands about which they felt deeply as individuals, without, however, representing the congregation.

Hudson moved to Bremerton, Washington, in 1993 where she joined a peace community involved in social justice issues. She became certified as a commercial driver and obtained a job driving a city bus in order to earn an income through which she both could support herself and meet her financial obligations to the congregation.

In 2000, Hudson and two other Sisters of her congregation, Carol Gilbert, O.P., and Ardeth Platte, O.P., entered Peterson Air Force Base without authorization and sprinkled blood on a fighter plane. The trio was caught and arrested. They were then held in a federal prison until the charges were dropped because there was no lasting damage done to the airplane. Gilbert claimed that the base was part of the "Star Wars" defense system and the government did not want to draw unnecessary attention to the area. In 2002, the same group of nuns gained access to a Minuteman III missile silo in Colorado. Wearing white hazmat suits emblazoned with "Citizen Weapon Inspection Team," they pounded on the missile, drew a cross in their own blood and prayed for peace.

At their pre-trial hearing, the Sisters, dressed in their religious habit, engaged in silent protest by only answering the judge with a nod. When their trial came about, the presiding judge, Robert E. Blackburn, granted an in limine motion to the prosecutor preventing the Sisters from arguing that their actions were legal under international law and the Nuremberg defense. The group was sentenced to between 31 and 40 months for obstructing national defense and damaging government property. The Sisters' appeal was rejected in 2005 by the 10th Circuit Court of Appeals.

In 2010, Hudson and 13 others illegally entered the grounds of Y-12 National Security Complex in Oak Ridge, Tennessee. She was incarcerated in a Georgia prison pending her sentence, but was allowed to go home in June 2011 due to a serious decline in her health.

== Death and legacy ==
Hudson died on August 3, 2011, at age 76, at the Harrison Medical Center near her home in Poulsbo, Washington. She had suffered from pneumonia, but the cause of death was multiple myeloma. For 58 years, until her death, she was a member of the Dominican Order. In November 2011, Dorli Rainey, an Occupy Seattle protester cited Hudson as her inspiration "to keep fighting the good fight, even in the winter years of her life."

== See also ==
- Ardeth Platte
- Carol Gilbert

== References and bibliography ==
- Ablao, Sue (2011). "Jackie Hudson Obituary, Ground Zero Volume 16 Issue 4" (PDF). Ground Zero Center for Nonviolent Action.
- Ayotte, Nancy (2011). "Michigan Peace Team's Newsletter, Volume 17 Issue 3". Michigan Peace Team. Archived from the original (PDF) on 2017-10-19.
- Berrigan, Daniel (2005). Genesis: Fair Beginnings, Then Foul. Lanham, MD: Rowman & Littlefield Publishers. ISBN 9780742531925.
- Falsani, Cathleen (2011). "The Unlikely Voice of a Generation: Dorli Rainey is "Maude" to the Occupy Movement's "Harold"". Sojourners.
- Fox, Thomas C (2011). "Peace activist Jackie Hudson dies at age 76". The National Catholic Reporter.
- Gilmore, Susan (2011). "Jackie Hudson, nun and activist for nuclear disarmament, 76". The Seattle Times. Archived from the original on 2011-09-20.
- Guzder, Deena (2011). Divine Rebels: American Christian Activists for Social Justice. Chicago Review Press. ISBN 978-1569762646.
- Head, Michael (2011). Crimes Against The State. Farnham, Surrey: Ashgate Publishing. ISBN 9780754678199.
- Honey, Charley (2011). "Dominican nun, Sister Jackie Hudson, known for anti-war protest activities mourned". The Grand Rapids Press.
- Nepstad, Sharon Erickson (2008). Religion and War Resistance in the Plowshares Movement. Cambridge University Press. ISBN 978-0521717670.
- Phan, Amy (2011). "Jackie Hudson, nun who believed in nuclear disarmament, dies at age 76". The Kitsap Sun.
- Siers, Lucianne, O.P., Sister (2011). "In Memoriam: Elegy for a peacemaker: Sister Jacqueline Hudson". Dominican Life USA.
- "Sister Jacqueline Marie Hudson". Grand Rapids Press. 2011.
- Strabala, William (2006). WMD, Nukes and Nuns. Algora Publishing. pp. 83–90. ISBN 978-0875864471.

=== Further reading ===
- Coday, Dennis (December 2006). "Nuns' food drive rebuffed". National Catholic Reporter. 43 (7). ISSN 0027-8939.
- Coffey, Kathy (October 2003). "Wily as serpents and simple as doves". U.S. Catholic. 68 (10): 50. ISSN 0041-7548.
- Jones, Melissa (September 2003). "Witnesses for peace put God before government". National Catholic Reporter. 39 (40): 34–35. ISSN 0027-8939.
- Nieves, Evelyn (May 2003). "Protesting nuns have not repented: They face lengthy jail terms but they're willing to pay the price". Washington Post. p. E4.
