= Verstappen v Port Edward Town Board =

South African legal case

- Court: Durban and Coast Local Division
- Full case name: Verstappen v Port Edward Town Board and Others
- Decided: 24 November 1993
- Citations: 1994 (3) SA 569 (D); 4645/93

Court membership
- Judge sitting: Magid J

Case opinions
- Decision by: Magid J

Keywords
- Environmental law, Waste disposal, Permit, Regulations, Locus standi, Public interest, Local authority, Interdict, Interim interdict, Balance of convenience

Verstappen v Port Edward Town Board and Others is an important case in South African environmental law, heard on September 29, 1993.

It was an application for an interim interdict in which certain questions were argued in limine. RJ Salmon, instructed by Garlicke & Bousfield Inc., appeared for the applicant. GD Harpur, instructed by Barry Botha & Breytenbach, appeared for the first respondent. There was no appearance for the second, third and fourth respondents, who had the State Attorney.

== Finding of the court ==
The court found that the requirement, enacted in section 20(1) of the Environment Conservation Act, of a permit issued by the Minister of Water Affairs to "establish, provide or operate" a waste-disposal site is plainly couched in the most peremptory language. The clear intention of the legislature, as expressed in section 20(1) of the Act, cannot be overridden by the Minister's failure, whether inadvertent or intentional, to make the appropriate regulations, as intended in section 20(2), providing for a form of application for such permit and the prescribed information required.

The court accordingly held that the Minister's failure to promulgate the regulations foreshadowed in section 20(2) of the Act did not render lawful the conduct of the first respondent, a local authority, in operating the waste disposal site (which the applicant sought to interdict) without a permit in terms of s 20(1) of the Act.

It was clear to the court, from the language of the Environment Conservation Act, that the legislature intended the provisions of the Act to operate in the interests of the public at large. That being the case, an applicant seeking an interdict against the unlawful operation of a waste disposal site without a permit is required to show that the contravention of the Act by the respondent has caused or was likely to cause him some special damage. The court held on the facts that the applicant had not shown that she had suffered any special damage at all.

The applicant also sought to establish her locus standi in judicio to apply for an interdict restraining the first respondent local authority from committing the illegality of operating the waste disposal site without the aforementioned permit on the basis that she was a ratepayer of the first respondent, and that in several reported cases the courts had afforded ratepayers the right to interdict local authorities from dealing with their funds or property contrary to law. The court held that it did not consider that the mere fact that some municipal funds were obviously spent in managing and operating the waste disposal site in question could conceivably afford the applicant locus standi to interdict what she regarded as an illegality. The court held that it had not been established on the papers that the first respondent's manner of operation of the waste disposal site was more expensive than any of the various methods suggested by the applicant.

The manner in which the grant or refusal of an interim interdict would affect the immediate parties to the litigation, the court found, is not the only matter relevant to a determination of the balance of convenience, which is relevant to the exercise by the court of its discretion to grant or refuse an interdict. Where, as in the present case, the wider general public is affected, the convenience of the public must be taken into account in any assessment of the balance of convenience.

== See also ==
- South African environmental law
