= Carol Gilbert =

American anti-nuclear activist (b. 1947)

Carol Gilbert, O.P., (born 1947) is an American Dominican religious sister and anti-nuclear activist.

== Life ==
Born in 1947 in Traverse City, Michigan, Gilbert was the elder of two children. She was raised in a middle class setting. At the age of 18, in 1965, she joined the Dominican Sisters of Grand Rapids. Starting in 1969, Gilbert taught junior high school students at various schools around Michigan. This lasted until 1977 when she started to teach at the Alternative Learning Center in Saginaw, Michigan. After 10 years of teaching, in 1979, she devoted her career to plowshares activism.

In 1998, Gilbert and four other protesters entered Andrews Air Force Base during the annual Department of Defense Open House and air show. The group banged on a B-52 with hammers and poured their own blood on it. For this, Gilbert spent 6 months in federal prison. In 2000, Gilbert and two other members of her congregation, sisters Jackie Hudson, O.P., and Ardeth Platte, O.P., illegally entered Peterson Air Force Base and sprinkled blood on a fighter plane. The group was arrested and held in a federal prison until the charges were dropped.

In 2002, the same group of sisters entered a Minuteman III missile silo in Colorado. Clad in white jump suits emblazoned with "Citizen Weapon Inspection Team," the group drew a cross in their own blood, banged on the silo, and prayed. The sisters were arrested and left on the ground for three hours. Their protest spilled over into their pre-trial hearing. Clad in full religious habit, the sisters answered the judge with a nod. At their trial, the presiding judge, Robert E. Blackburn, granted an in limine motion to the prosecutor. This prevented the sisters from arguing that their actions were legal under international law and the Nuremberg defense. They were sentenced to between 30 and 41 months in prison. Due to their activism, in 2005 and 2006 Gilbert and Platte were labeled as terrorists by the State of Maryland. While in prison Sister Carol Gilbert met fellow federal inmate Martha Stewart.

== See also ==
Daniel Berrigan SJ	Jackie Hudson OP
Frida Berrigan	Steve Kelly SJ
Phil Berrigan	Liz McAlister
William Bichsel SJ	Anne Montgomery RSCJ
Susan Crane	Ardeth Platte OP
David Eberhardt	Megan Rice SHCJ

== Bibliography ==
- Berrigan, Daniel (2005). Genesis: Fair Beginnings, Then Foul. Lanham, MD: Rowman & Littlefield Publishers. ISBN 9780742531925.
- Brasch, Walter M (2005). America's Unpatriotic Acts the Federal Government's Violation of Constitutional and Civil Rights. Lang, Peter Publishing. ISBN 0820476080.
- Head, Michael (2011). Crimes Against The State. Farnham, Surrey: Ashgate Publishing. ISBN 9780754678199.
- James, Joy (2007). Warfare in the American Homeland: Policing and Prison in a Penal Democracy. Durham: Duke University Press. ISBN 978-0822339236.
- LoBianco, Tom (2008). "Protesting nuns branded terrorists". The Washington Times.
- "Maryland Nuns Branded as Suspected Terrorists". Fox News. 2008.
- Siers, Lucianne, O.P., Sister (2011). "In Memoriam: Elegy for a peacemaker: Sister Jacqueline Hudson". Dominican Life USA.
- Strabala, William (2006). WMD, Nukes and Nuns. Algora Publishing. ISBN 978-0875864471.
