= Ardeth Platte =

Anti-nuclear activist

- Born: April 10, 1936; Lansing, Michigan
- Died: September 30, 2020 (aged 84); Washington, D.C.
- Education: Aquinas College
- Occupations: Religious sister, activist
- Organization: Dominican Sisters of Grand Rapids
- Known for: Anti-war/anti-nuclear activism
- Movement: Plowshares Movement
- Criminal charges: Obstructing national defense and damaging government property
- Criminal penalty: 41 months of imprisonment at Danbury Federal Correctional Institution
- Criminal status: released

Ardeth Platte, O.P., (10 April 1936 – 30 September 2020) was an American Dominican religious sister and anti-nuclear activist. She was inducted into the Michigan Women's Hall of Fame in 1999.

== Early life ==
Platte was born in Lansing, Michigan in 1936 and grew up in Westphalia, Michigan, graduating from St. Mary's High School in Westphalia in 1953 as its valedictorian. She entered the Dominican Sisters of Grand Rapids in 1954, at the age of 18, and after her novitiate studied at Aquinas College operated by them in Grand Rapids, Michigan to train as a schoolteacher. In 1967, she founded the St. Joseph Alternative Education Center in Saginaw, Michigan, a school for children who had been denied access to other institutions. In 1995, Platte moved to Jonah House in Baltimore, Maryland, where she took part in Plowshares actions.

Platte served on the Saginaw City Council from 1977 to 1985.

== Activism ==
In 2000, Platte, along with two other members of her religious congregation, Sisters Jackie Hudson, O.P., and Carol Gilbert, O.P., illegally entered Peterson Air Force Base and sprayed a fighter plane with their own blood. The three women were arrested and held in prison until the charges were dropped. In 2002, the same trio entered a Minuteman III missile silo in Colorado. They wore white jump suits bearing the words "Citizen Weapon Inspection Team", and proceeded to pray in front of the silo as they poured their own blood on it in the shape of a cross. The sisters were arrested and had to wait lying on the ground for hours. They continued protesting into their pre-trial hearing; wearing full religious habits, the Sisters answered the judge by nodding without speaking. At the start of their trial, Robert E. Blackburn, the presiding judge, granted an in limine motion to the prosecutor, which prevented the sisters from arguing that their actions were legal under international law and the Nuremberg defense. They were sentenced to between 30 and 41 months in prison.

Platte was released from prison on December 22, 2005. She was not due to be released until May 31 of the next year, but a judge took into consideration the time she had already served, according to the Federal Bureau of Prisons. She then served three more years of probation. She is considered a terrorist by the Maryland State Police.

Platte, like other residents of Jonah House, donated a collection of materials documenting her peace activism to DePaul University Special Collections and Archives. The Ardeth Platte Papers are part of the Collection on Peace Activism.

== In popular culture ==
Platte was the inspiration for the character of Sister Jane Ingalls (played by Beth Fowler) on the television show Orange Is the New Black. The book Transform Now Plowshares: Megan Rice, Gregory Boertje-Obed, and Michael Walli (Liturgical Press 2022) is dedicated to her, and features many of the antinuclear actions she did with sisters Gilbert, Hudson, and others.

== See also ==
- Carol Gilbert
- Jackie Hudson
- Megan Rice
- Jon Katz. ""I felt I had touched his heart" - Sister Ardeth Platte. Persuading with non-anger".
- Manny Gonzales. "3rd pacifist nun who defaced Weld missile silo is released".
