= Minister of Health and Welfare v Woodcarb =

South African legal case

- Court: Natal Provincial Division
- Full case name: Minister of Health and Welfare v Woodcarb (Pty) Ltd and Another
- Decided: 15 December 1995

Court membership
- Judge sitting: Hurt J

Case opinions
- Decision by: Hurt J

Minister of Health and Welfare v Woodcarb (Pty) Ltd and Another is an important case in South African environmental law, heard in the Natal Provincial Division by Hurt J on March 29, 1995, with judgment handed down on December 15, 1995. Counsel for the applicant was CJ Hartzenberg SC (with him M G Roberts); DA Gordon SC appeared for the respondents. The applicant's attorney was the State Attorney; the respondents' attorneys were Venn, Nemeth & Hart.

The matter dealt with the question of atmospheric pollution: in particular, the carrying on of a "scheduled process" within a controlled area in contravention of section 9(1) of Atmospheric Pollution Prevention Act. The court found that the remedy of interdict was available to enforce the provisions of this Act, so that the Minister of Health and Welfare was not limited to the remedy of criminal prosecution.

The Minister of Health and Welfare was responsible for the proper administration and enforcement of the Act. The purpose of provisions of sections 9 to 13 was to "control" the installation and use of "scheduled processes" throughout South Africa. The court found that the Minister needed the remedy of interdict for that purpose, and accordingly had locus standi to apply for such an interdict. Because none of the respondent's neighbours were applicants in such proceedings, Minister also had locus standi to apply for an interdict restraining such conduct of the respondent which infringed the right to "an environment which is not detrimental to their health and well-being," as enshrined in section 29 of the interim Constitution, then in effect. The generation of smoke, in contravention of s 9(1) of Atmospheric Pollution Prevention Act 45 of 1965, was just such an infringement.

== Judgment ==
The Atmospheric Pollution Prevention Act, the court found, does authorise the Minister of Health and Welfare to apply for an interdict to enforce the provisions of section 9(1) thereof, and to restrain conduct which constitutes the carrying on of a "scheduled process" within a controlled area without a current registration certificate, in contravention of section 9(1). The Minister is not limited, therefore, to the specific criminal penalties provided for contraventions of section 9. The Act provides no specific "remedies" which the Minister or any other interested party can invoke to stop a person from contravening it. In such circumstances the principle does not arise that the Act is exclusive as to what may be done to enforce its provisions. The dictum in Johannesburg City Council v Knoetze and Sons was thus approved and applied.

The Minister of Health and Welfare is responsible for the proper administration and enforcement of the Atmospheric Pollution Prevention Act. The whole purpose of the legislation, and particularly of the provisions of sections 9-13 of the Act, is to "control" the installation and use of scheduled processes throughout the Republic, seeing that the whole of the Republic has been designated as a "controlled area." It cannot, in these circumstances, be contended that the Minister does not need the remedy of injunction to enable her to control these processes effectively and thereby discharge her duties under the Act. Accordingly, the court found, the Minister has locus standi to apply for an interdict to restrain conduct which constitutes a contravention of section 9(1) of the Act.

Conduct which is unlawful in the light of section 9 of the Act, in casu the generation of smoke producing noxious or offensive gases at the respondents' sawmill by means of a scheduled process, was found also to be an infringement of the rights of the respondents' neighbours to "an environment which is not detrimental to their health and well-being," enshrined for them in section 29 of the interim Constitution. Insofar as none of those neighbours were applicants for an interdict restraining such infringement, the Minister of Health and Welfare could rely on the provisions of section 7(4)(b)(iv) of the Constitution for locus standi to apply to Court for an interdict to restrain conduct which infringes the rights under section 29 of the neighbours of such respondent.

== See also ==
- South African environmental law
