= Folias Duo =

American chamber music duo group

Folias Flute and Guitar Duo
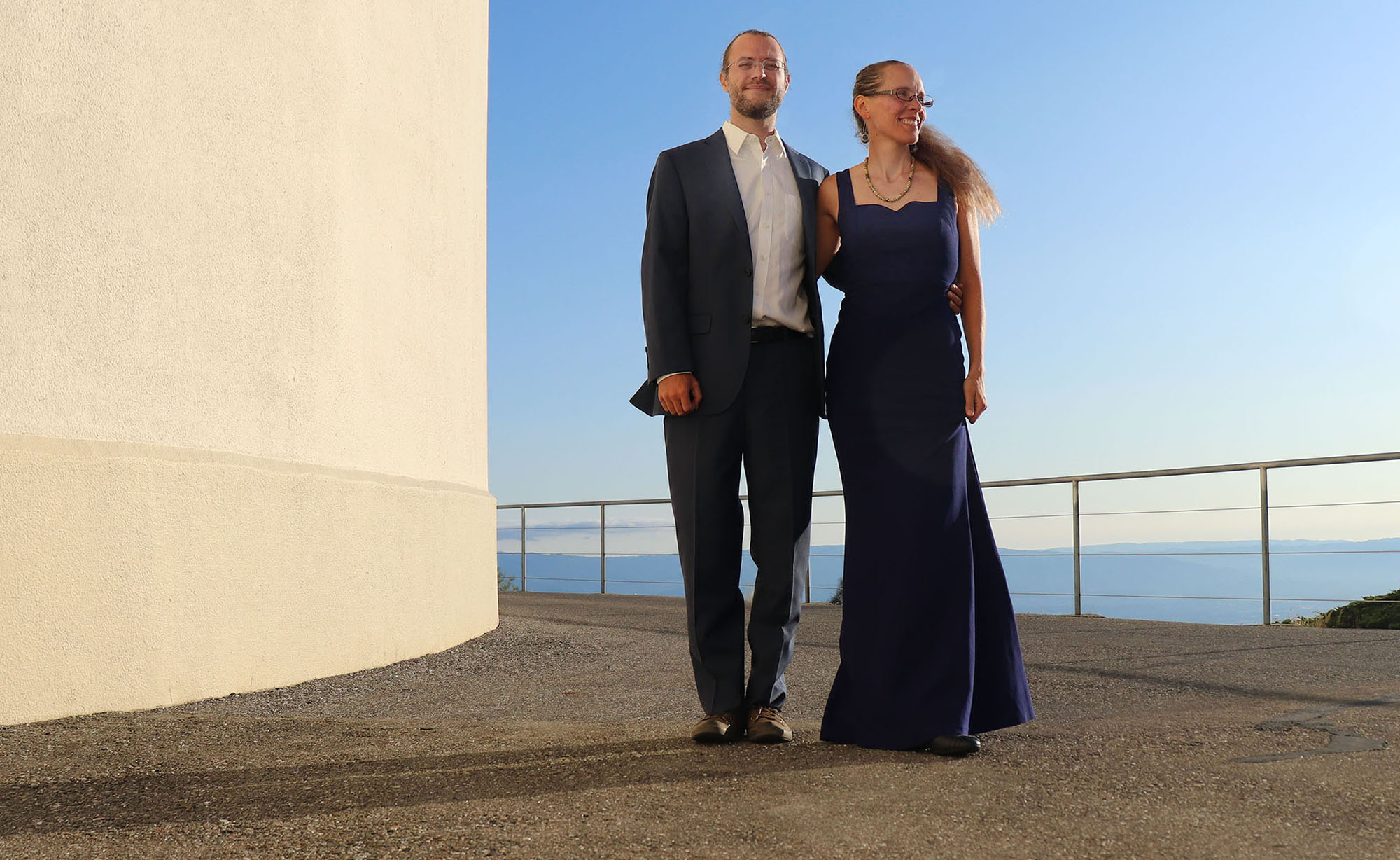
- Folias Duo (Carmen Maret, Andrew Bergeron)

Background information
- Origin: Grand Rapids, Michigan, United States
- Genres: Classical, Tango
- Years active: 2002–present
- Labels: Folias Music; Blue Griffin Recording Inc.
- Members: Andrew Bergeron, guitar Carmen Maret, flute
- Website: www.foliasmusic.com

Folias Duo (formerly Folias Flute and Guitar Duo) is an American performer/composer chamber music duo group consisting of flutist Carmen Maret and guitarist Andrew Bergeron. Bergeron and Maret met at Michigan State University while finishing their Master’s Degrees in Music and they were married in 2003. The formation of the duo was brought about by a mutual inspiration for original art music, love of nature and the music of Astor Piazzolla and through their work as Argentine tango dance band leaders.

Bergeron and Maret first played together in 2002 and released their first album Tangos Metamorphoses in 2004 on the Blue Griffin Recording label based in Lansing, MI. The album includes Astor Piazzola’s most famous work for flute and guitar Histoire du Tango. This was followed by Marufo Vega in 2006 which contains their first original composition inspired by tango called Despoblado Suite. In the summer of 2007 they were Artists in Residence on Isle Royale National Park and released the album Waterway in 2008 which contains all original flute and guitar compositions composed about Lake Superior. This was followed by their 2011 release Tango and Snow, an album also with all original flute and guitar compositions that brought together their interest in tango and of nature writing. Viewpoints, the duo's fifth album was released in 2014 and brought together the couple's musical inspirations from ten years of playing and composing together.

Folias Duo has since released two albums on their own Folias Music label, the critically acclaimed Dreaming to Live (2017) and Delicate Omens released in October 2019.

Andrew Bergeron is an instructor of guitar and music theory at Grand Rapids Community College, Grand Valley State University and Aquinas College. Andrew is a founding performer and composer with the Grand Rapids Guitar Quartet.

Carmen Maret is an endorsed Pearl Flutes artist and professor of flute at Aquinas College.

== Discography ==
=== Studio albums ===
- Tangos Metamorphoses (2004) BGR 111
- Marufo Vega (2006) BGR 135
- Waterway (2008) BGR 175
- Tango and Snow (2011) BGR 229
- Viewpoints (2014) BGR 341
- Dreaming to Live (2017) FM-01
- Delicate Omens (2019) FM-02

=== Other contributions ===
- Latin Dance Project (2010) White Pine Music
- Heartside Sketches (2010) Steve Talaga

=== Compositions ===
- Waves and Waterfalls, Bergeron (2006)Folias Music/ASCAP
- Calm to Storm, Bergeron (2006)Folias Music/ASCAP
- The Four Seasons of Lake Superior, Bergeron/Maret (2006)Folias Music/ASCAP
- High Tide, Bergeron (2007)Folias Music/ASCAP
- Fog Break, Bergeron (2007)Folias Music/ASCAP
- Walkabout Sparrow, Bergereon/Maret (2007)Folias Music/ASCAP
- Gauntlet of Death, Maret (2007)Folias Music/ASCAP
- Alpha's Last Dance, Maret (2007)Folias Music/ASCAP
- Full Long Nights Moon, Bergeron (2009)Folias Music/ASCAP
- Rock Etudes, Maret (2009)Folias Music/ASCAP
- Tango and Snow, Bergeron (2010)Folias Music/ASCAP
- Algonquin Vals, Bergeron/Maret (2010)Folias Music/ASCAP
- Cumparsita Cats, Maret (2010)Folias Music/ASCAP
- The Lemon Smugglers, Maret (2010)Folias Music/ASCAP
- Adequate Conditions Blues, Maret (2010)Folias Music/ASCAP
- Through the Rain, Bergeron (2011)Folias Music/ASCAP
- Pajaro Rojo Santo, Maret (2011)Folias Music/ASCAP
- Tango Destroyer, Maret (2011)Folias Music/ASCAP
- Truffle Oil, Maret (2012)Folias Music/ASCAP
- Scotch Bonnet, Bergeron/Maret (2012)Folias Music/ASCAP
- Border Trilogy, Bergeron (2013)Folias Music/ASCAP
- Mamba Guineé, Maret (2013)Folias Music/ASCAP
- Sotres, Bergeron (2013)Folias Music/ASCAP
- Buenos Aires Cab Ride, Maret (2013)Folias Music/ASCAP
- Cabrales, Bergeron/Maret (2013)Folias Music/ASCAP
- Folias Variations, Bergeron (2014)Folias Music/ASCAP
- Phoenix Trilogy, Bergeron (2016)Folias Music/ASCAP
- Naturaleza Suite, Maret (2016) Folias Music/ASCAP
- Impossible Eclipse, Maret (2016) Folias Music/ASCAP
- Uncompahgre, Bergeron (2018) Folias Music/ASCAP
- Emerson, Bergeron (2018) Folias Music/ASCAP
- Creole Ballet, Maret (2019) Folias Music/ASCAP
- Angel Forever, Maret (2019) Folias Music/ASCAP
