= Aquinas College (Michigan) =

Catholic college in Grand Rapids, Michigan, US

- Former names: Novitiate Normal School (1886–1922); Sacred Heart College (1922–1920s); Marywood College (1920s–1931); Catholic Junior College (1931–1939)
- Motto: Non nisi te, Domine (Latin)
- Motto in English: "Nothing but You, Lord".
- Type: Private liberal arts college
- Established: 1886
- Religious affiliation: Roman Catholic (Dominican Sisters of Grand Rapids)
- Academic affiliations: AACU
- Endowment: $48 million as of 2021
- President: Maureen Geary
- Provost: Terry Keller
- Faculty: 86 full time 159 part-time
- Students: 1,265
- Undergraduates: 1,169
- Postgraduates: 96
- Location: Grand Rapids, Michigan, United States; 42.9600°N 85.6286°W
- Campus: Urban, 117 acres (0.47 km^{2})
- Colors: Maroon & White
- Nickname: Saints
- Sporting affiliations: NAIA – WHAC
- Mascot: Nelson the St. Bernard (dog)
- Website: www.aquinas.edu

Aquinas College is a private Catholic liberal arts college in Grand Rapids, Michigan, United States. The Dominican Sisters of Grand Rapids formed it as the Novitiate Normal School in 1886. It has also been known as Sacred Heart College, Maywood College, and Catholic Junior College. The college has more than 2,000 undergraduate and graduate students and offers 61 majors, awarding bachelor's degrees and master's degrees.

== History ==
The Congregation of Our Lady of the Sacred Heart of the Order of Preachers (Dominicans), today commonly known as the "Dominican Sisters of Grand Rapids", led by Mother Aquinata Fiegler, OP, founded the Novitiate Normal School in Traverse City, Michigan in 1886. The school's mission was to educate young women who had yet to make their vows in the Order (i.e., novices), to be parochial school teachers throughout Michigan. It trained and sent forth numerous sister teachers successfully. In 1911, the school was transferred to Grand Rapids, along with the motherhouse of the sisters, under an invitation of the bishop of the young Diocese of Grand Rapids.

In response to the need for their sister teachers to hold baccalaureate degrees, in 1922 the sisters reorganized the Novitiate Normal School as Sacred Heart College and also commenced admitting lay women. The State of Michigan granted a charter to award two-year degrees to women in the new college in the same year. The site of the new college was transferred to the newly erected motherhouse of the Sisters on East Fulton Street, in the margins of Grand Rapids.

At some time between 1922 and 1931 it was renamed as Marywood College. In 1931, it was reorganized as Catholic Junior College, transferred to a site on Ransom Street adjacent to the Grand Rapids Public Library, and became the first Roman Catholic college in the United States governed by women religious to become coeducational. Bishop Joseph G. Pinten of Grand Rapids instigated the reform to admit men alongside women. At that time it awarded two-year degrees.

In 1939, Catholic Junior College added a third year to its curriculum. The college began awarding baccalaureate degrees and was renamed Aquinas College in honor of St. Thomas Aquinas and its founder, Mother Aquinata Fiegler, OP, in 1940, but the articles of incorporation to legally effect the institutional change were not filed with the State of Michigan until 1941. In 1945, Mother Euphrasia Sullivan, OP executed for the college the purchase of the Holmdene Mansion, erected by Edward Lowe in 1908, and its arboreal lands, at 1607 Robinson Road, bordering East Fulton Street. The college relocated to the former Lowe estate where it is sited to this day. The North Central Association accredited it in 1946.

In 1948 students instituted a chapter of the Dominican Third (Secular) Order (tertiaries; TOP). In May 1950 the outdoor Shrine of Our Lady of Fatima was dedicated, in memory of the members of Aquinas College who sacrificed their lives in the Second World War, after a student and alumni campaign of two years.

The 1950s and 1960s were a period of great growth and construction and during them, the college abandoned and sold the original campus on Ransom Street. In 1955 the new Administration Building, now the "Academic Building", was erected.

In 1974 the college became legally independent of the Dominican Sisters of Grand Rapids. In 1975 the name of the athletic teams was changed from the "Tommies" to the "Saints", under a student poll, because African American members had been racially ridiculed as "Toms".

In 1977 the college was accredited to award its first graduate degree, the Master of Management in business, which was distinct from the conventional Master of Business Administration (MBA) degree awarded by other institutions because it was primarily based on the humanities and not mathematics. In 1993 the college awarded its first doctorate, albeit honoris causa.

Also in 1997, the college officially named its mascot, a St. Bernard dog, "Nelson" in honor of President Paul Nelson, who retired that year. In 1998 the college was reorganized into three schools, each led by a dean and subdivided into departments: the School of Education, the School of Liberal Arts and Sciences, and the School of Management.

A marker designating the college as a Michigan Historic Site was erected by the Michigan History Division, Department of State in 1962. The inscription reads:

Aquinas had its beginning in 1887 as the Novitiate Normal School of the Dominican Sisters of Marywood. In 1922 it became Marywood College of the Sacred Heart. When the college was moved downtown in 1931, it became the coeducational Catholic Junior College. It began operating as a four-year college in 1940 and was named in honor of the great medieval theologian and philosopher, Saint Thomas Aquinas. Aquinas is primarily a liberal arts college. It was moved to this campus, the former Lowe estate, in 1945.

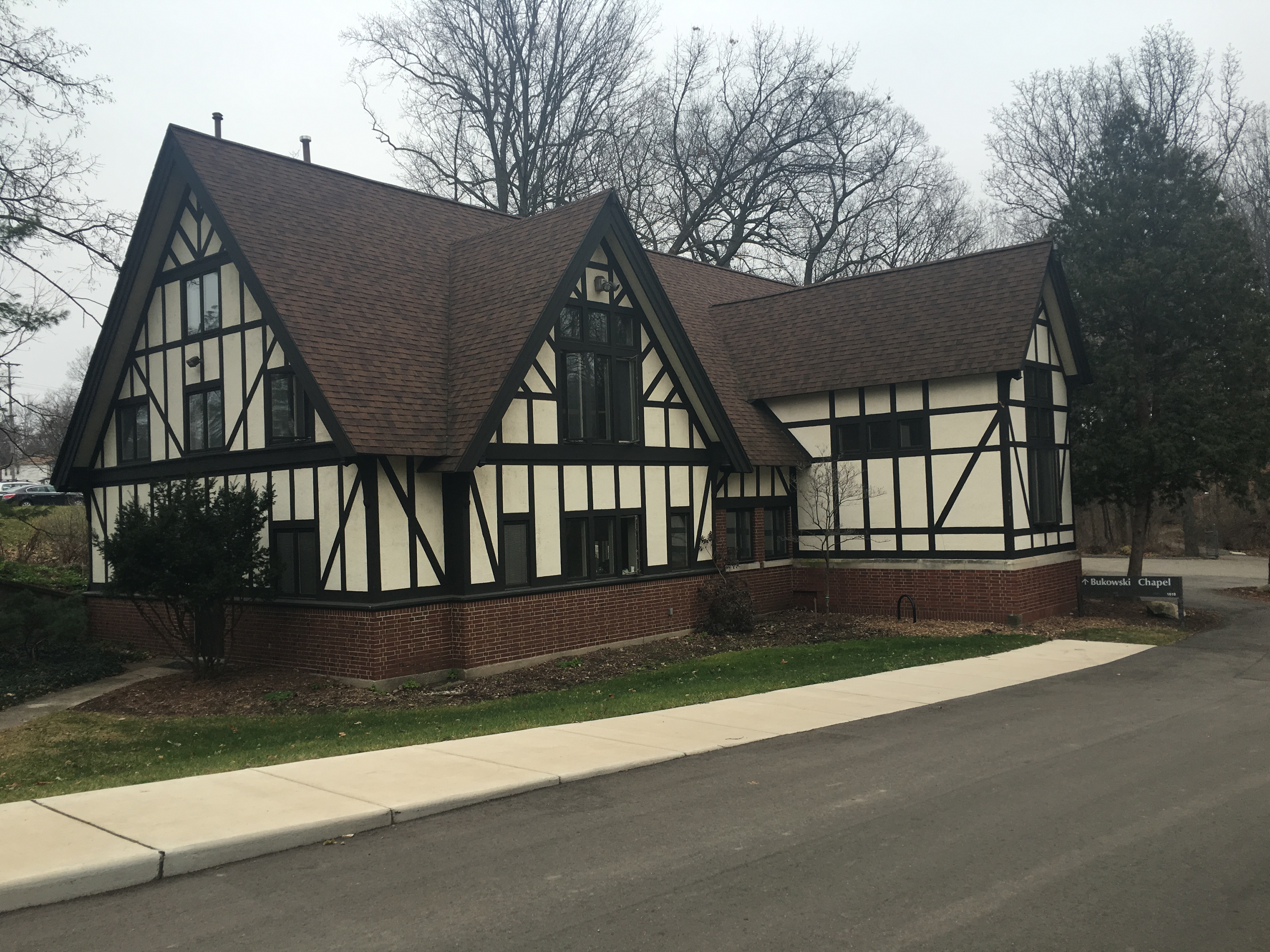
Msgr. Arthur F. Bukowski Roman Catholic Chapel

== Campus ==
The arboreal campus is in Grand Rapids, Michigan. The college has four dormitories: Dominican Hall, Hruby Hall, Regina Hall, and St. Joseph Hall. It also has five apartment buildings on campus and five "living-learning communities", denominated "houses" on campus.

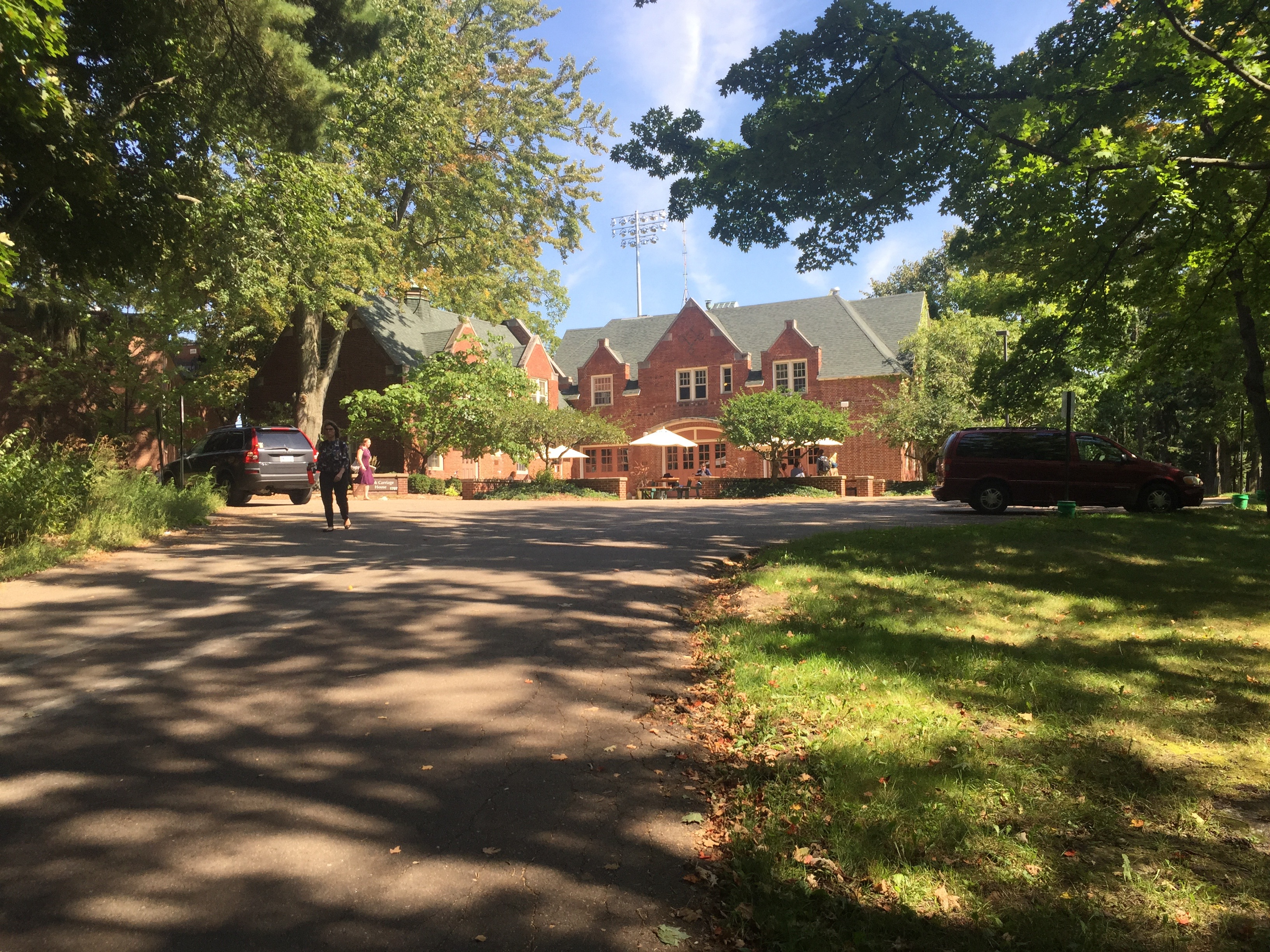
"The Moose" (Cook Carriage House)

== Academics ==
Admissions statistics
- 2021 entering class
- Admit rate: 89.0 (1,275 out of 1,432)
- Yield rate: 16.9 (216 out of 1,275)

Test scores middle 50%^{[i]}
- SAT Total: 1000–1170 (among 45% of FTFs)
- ACT Composite: 20–25 (among 7% of FTFs)

The college has around 1,200 undergraduate and graduate students and offers 61 majors, awarding bachelor's degrees and master's degrees. It is accredited by the Higher Learning Commission. Its most popular undergraduate majors, in terms of 2021 graduates, were:

Business Administration & Management (39)
Psychology (29)
Liberal Arts & Sciences/Liberal Studies (26)
Business/Corporate Communications (16)
Speech Communication & Rhetoric (15)
Biology/Biological Sciences (11)
Elementary Education & Teaching (11)

Many graduates continue to graduate schools. The opportunity to study away is a major attraction to many students, as many study for a semester at an international institution.

== Administration ==
The college is headed by a president and a board of trustees. The college's first administrator was Monsignor Bukowski, for whom its chapel is named. In February 1969, Norbert J. Hruby succeeded Bukowski as president. Hruby Hall, an administrative building and residence hall on campus, bears his name.

Aquinas's third president, Peter D. O’Connor, served from 1986 to 1990. R. Paul Nelson served as the fourth president from 1990 to 1997 followed by Harry J. Knopke from 1997 to 2006. On July 1, 2006, Provost C. Edward Balog was named interim president and he became the college's sixth president in May 2007; he retired on June 30, 2011. Juan Olivarez became the seventh president on July 1, 2011, and retired upon completion of the school year in the spring of 2017. Kevin Quinn was the eighth president and left mid-term. Steve Germic served as the interim president until July 2022, when Alicia Córdoba was elected. She served as the ninth president of the college until resigning in April 2025. Maureen Geary accepted the board's invitation to serve as interim president in April 2025 and was appointed president on July 7, 2025.

== Student publications and radio ==
Publications at the college include:

- The Paraclete, a Catholic news and commentary publication
- The Torch
- The Saint

The student radio station is "AQ Sound".

== Athletics ==
The Aquinas athletic teams are called the Saints. The university is a member of the National Association of Intercollegiate Athletics (NAIA), primarily competing in the Wolverine–Hoosier Athletic Conference (WHAC) since the 1992–93 academic year.

Aquinas compete in 30 intercollegiate varsity sports: Men's sports include baseball, basketball, bowling, cross country, golf, ice hockey, lacrosse, rugby, soccer, swimming & diving, track & field, and volleyball; while women's sports basketball, bowling, cross country, dance, golf, ice hockey, lacrosse, rugby, soccer, softball, stunt, swimming & diving, tennis, track & field, and volleyball; and co-ed sports include cheerleading and eSports.

== Notable people ==
=== Notable alumni ===
- Paul Assenmacher, professional baseball player
- Carlos Camacho, first Governor of Guam
- Phil Cavanagh, member of the Michigan House of Representatives
- Clement Chiwaya, Malawian politician
- Dave Gumpert, professional baseball player and sportscaster
- Bob Hay, songwriter and musician
- Dave Joppie, professional baseball coach
- Kenneth Marin, economist
- Patrick Miles Jr., former U.S. Attorney for the Western District of Michigan
- Godfrey Mwakikagile, writer and scholar of African studies
- Ardeth Platte, anti-nuclear activist
- Randy Richardville, member of the Michigan Senate
- Roy Schmidt, member of the Michigan House of Representatives
- Brad D. Smith, former CEO of Intuit, President of Marshall University
- Glenn Steil Sr., member of the Michigan Senate
- Shirley Weis, former chief administrative officer of Mayo Clinic
- Brian Williams, sportscaster
- Michael Woroniecki, Christian missionary and street preacher

=== Notable faculty ===
- Andrew Bergeron, guitarist and member of the Folias Duo group
- Mary Jane Dockeray, environmental educator
- AnaLouise Keating, gender studies academic
- Carmen Maret, flutist and member of the Folias Duo group
- Kenneth Marin, economist
- Gleaves Whitney, political scholar
