= South African environmental law =

Legal rules relating to management of the environment

South African environmental law describes the legal rules in South Africa relating to the social, economic, philosophical and jurisprudential issues raised by attempts to protect and conserve the environment in South Africa. South African environmental law encompasses natural resource conservation and utilization, as well as land-use planning and development. Issues of enforcement are also considered, together with the international dimension, which has shaped much of the direction of environmental law in South Africa. The role of the country's Constitution, crucial to any understanding of the application of environmental law, also is examined. The National Environmental Management Act (NEMA) provides the underlying framework for environmental law.

== The concept of the "environment" ==
The National Environmental Management Act (NEMA) defines "environment" as the surroundings within which humans exist. These are made up of:

1. the land, the water and the atmosphere of the earth;
2. micro-organisms, plant and animal life;
3. any part or combination of the first two items on this list, and the interrelationships among and between them; and
4. the physical, chemical, aesthetic and cultural properties and conditions of the foregoing that influence human health and well-being.

In addition, the Environment Conservation Act defines the environment as "the aggregate of surrounding objects, conditions and influences that influence the life and habits of man or any other organism or collection of organisms."

== Scope of environmental law ==
Prof Jan Glazewski of the University of Cape Town takes the view that environmental law encompasses the following three "distinct but interrelated areas of general concern." They are:

1. land-use planning and development;
2. resource conservation and utilisation; and
3. waste management and pollution control.

== Legal norms and standards ==
"Not every legal norm relating to the environment," observes Rabie, "is regarded as constituting environmental law. Environmental law presupposes that the norm in question is aimed at or is used for environmental conservation."

"Environmental conservation" describes the conservation of natural resources and control of environmental pollution. This is done through a process known as "environmental management." Environmental-law norms relate to the management of the environment.

=== Emerging international norms and concepts ===
A few of the emerging international norms and concepts in environmental law are noted below, together in some cases with a discussion of their application in South Africa.

==== Sustainable development ====
Sustainable development seeks to combat the idea that, while moving away from traditional sources of energy, civilisation would be forced to sacrifice growth, innovation, and progress. The 1983 World Commission on Environment and Development, convened by UN General Assembly, provided the most-cited definition of the concept: "development that meets the needs of the present without compromising the ability of future generations to meet their own needs." This aspiration contains within it two key concepts:

1. "the concept of needs, in particular the essential needs of the world's poor, to which overriding priority must be given;" and
2. "the idea of limitations imposed by the state of technology and social organisation on the environment's ability to meet present and future needs."

The concept encompasses more than merely the environment, so for present purposes the focus should be on environmental sustainability: the goal of utilising the environment in a way which both meets human needs and ensures the environment's indefinite preservation.

NEMA defines "sustainable development" as "the integration of social, economic and environmental factors into planning, implementation and decision-making so as to ensure that development serves present and future generations." NEMA provides further that "sustainable development requires the consideration of all relevant factors including:

- "that the disturbance of ecosystems and loss of biological diversity are avoided, or, where they cannot be altogether avoided, are minimised and remedied;
- "that pollution and degradation of the environment are avoided, or, where they cannot be altogether avoided, are minimised and remedied;
- "that the disturbance of landscapes and sites that constitute the nation's cultural heritage is avoided, or where it cannot be altogether avoided, is minimised and remedied;
- "that waste is avoided, or where it cannot be altogether avoided, minimised and re-used or recycled where possible and otherwise disposed of in a responsible manner;
- "that the use and exploitation of non-renewable natural resources is responsible and equitable, and takes into account the consequences of the depletion of the resource;
- "that the development, use and exploitation of renewable resources and the ecosystems of which they are part do not exceed the level beyond which their integrity is jeopardised;
- "that a risk-averse and cautious approach is applied, which takes into account the limits of current knowledge about the consequences of decisions and actions; and
- "that negative impacts on the environment and on people's environmental rights be anticipated and prevented, and where they cannot be altogether prevented, are minimised and remedied."

==== Intergenerational equity ====
Intergenerational equity is, as the name implies, the concept of equality between the generations—children, youth, adults and seniors. In discussions of climate change especially, people are often exhorted to think of the legacy they are leaving their children and grandchildren.

==== Environmental justice ====
NEMA provides that "environmental justice must be pursued so that adverse environmental impacts shall not be distributed in such a manner as to unfairly discriminate against any person, particularly vulnerable and disadvantaged persons."

==== Environmental rights ====
This term does not imply that "environment' has rights in South African Law but rather the right of people to an environment that is safeguarded, in fulfilment of the government's public trust duties, for current and future generations.

Section 24 of the South African Constitution states that "everyone has the right:

- "to an environment that is not harmful to their health or well-being; and
- "to have the environment protected, for the benefit of present and future generations, through reasonable legislative and other measures that
  - "prevent pollution and ecological degradation;
  - "promote conservation; and
  - "secure ecologically sustainable development and use of natural resources while promoting justifiable economic and social development."

==== Public trust doctrine ====
"The environment," according to NEMA, "is held in public trust for the people. The beneficial use of environmental resources must serve the public interest and the environment must be protected as the people's common heritage."

==== Precautionary principle ====
Principle 15 of the Rio Declaration provides as follows:

Where there are threats of serious or irreversible damage, lack of full scientific certainty shall not be used as a reason for postponing cost-effective measures to prevent environmental degradation.

As noted above, NEMA requires "that a risk-averse and cautious approach [be] applied, which takes into account the limits of current knowledge about the consequences of decisions and actions."

==== Preventive principle ====
Underlying this principle is the idea that only to be reacting to crises, when they happen, is far more expensive (and in more than just the pecuniary sense) than forestalling or preventing them before they happen. This is the fundamental notion behind laws regulating the generation, transportation, treatment, storage and disposal of hazardous waste, and laws regulating the use of pesticides. It is also the foundation of the Basel Convention on the Control of Transboundary Movements of Hazardous Wastes and their Disposal (1989), which sought to minimise the production of hazardous waste and to combat illegal dumping. The preventive principle was an important element, too, of the European Community's Third Environmental Action Programme, adopted in 1983.

In South Africa, NEMA requires "that pollution and degradation of the environment are avoided, or, where they cannot be altogether avoided, are minimised and remedied."

==== Polluter-pays principle ====
This principle, widely understood to be commonsensical and intuitively fair, is analogous to the slogan "you break, you pay." It makes the party responsible for producing the pollution responsible for paying for the damage done to the natural environment. It has attained the status of a regional custom, because of the strong support it has received in most OECD and EC countries. In terms of Principle 16 of the Rio Declaration,

National authorities should endeavour to promote the internalisation of environmental costs and the use of economic instruments, taking into account the approach that the polluter should, in principle, bear the costs of pollution, with due regard to the public interests, and without distorting international trade and investment.

NEMA echoes this:

The costs of remedying pollution, environmental degradation and consequent adverse health effects and of preventing, controlling or minimising further pollution, environmental damage or adverse health effects must be paid for by those responsible for harming the environment.

==== Local-level governance ====
Questions about how environmental decisions are made, and about who makes them, are questions of environmental governance. This lies at the heart of environmental law and policy. Of especial relevance in the context of South African law are Schedules 4 and 5 of the Constitution.

==== Common but differentiated responsibility ====
The principle of common but differentiated responsibility (CBDR) is an important principle of international environmental law, explicitly formulated in the Principle 7 of the Rio Declaration:

In view of the different contributions to global environmental degradation, States have common but differentiated responsibilities. The developed countries acknowledge the responsibility that they bear in the international pursuit of sustainable development in view of the pressures their societies place on the global environment and of the technologies and financial resources they command.

== Legislation regulating environmental management ==
Legislation, from an environmental point of view, may be divided into six categories:

1. legislation aimed exclusively at environmental management, like the National Parks Act and the Atmospheric Pollution Prevention Act;
2. legislation calculated to promote an environmental object, like the Mountain Catchment Areas Act;
3. legislation not specifically directed at environmental management, but including individual provisions aimed at environmental management, like the Nuclear Energy Act, the Sea-Shore Act and the National Roads Act;
4. legislation not aimed at environmental management, but including provisions that are directly or potentially of environmental significance, like land-use planning legislation and the Customs and Excise Act;
5. legislation not aimed at environmental management, but rather at environmental exploitation (like the old mining legislation and legislation promoting afforestation and fishing, and the development of townships); and, finally,
6. Legislation with no environmental relevance .

== Sources ==
There are a number of diverse sources of South African environmental law:

- International law – Both international customary law and international conventions function as sources of South African environmental law.
- Common law – A variety of common-law rules, derived from neighbour law, for example, and the law of nuisance, are of significance as sources of environmental law. The dictum sic utere tuo ut alienum non laedas ("use your own so as to cause no harm") furnishes one instance.
- Constitution of South Africa – The Constitution now informs and underlies the entire legal system in South Africa. Of prime importance is the Bill of Rights, with its explicit provision for environmental rights. The Constitution provides a framework for the administration of environmental laws.
- Statute law – Environmental law is also derived, fairly obviously, from national and provincial legislation, and from local by-laws.
- Customary law – Custom functions to some degree as a source of environmental law.

== Jurisprudential grounding ==
There are, broadly speaking, two bases in jurisprudence for protection of the environment:

1. the biocentric (or life-centred) approach; and
2. the anthropocentric (or human-centred) approach.

The anthropocentric approach finds some support in the common law of South Africa. There is, again, the Roman-law maxim sic utere tuo ut alienum laedas ("you may use your property only in such a way as will not harm another"), for example. The Constitution, insofar as it deals with the environment, also embraces anthropocentric philosophy, providing for basic environmental rights.

NEMA additionally provides that "environmental management must place people and their needs at the forefront of its concern, and serve their physical, psychological, developmental, cultural and social interests equitably."

== History ==
=== Pre-1994 ===
==== First three centuries ====
For the first three centuries of South African law, the most prominent environmental issues were

- the control of drinking water;
- pollution; and
- the conservation of wild animals. This last became increasingly important in the late Nineteenth and early Twentieth Century, when the first conservation areas were established.

==== 1940–1969 ====
In the three decades from 1940 to 1969, environmental concern intensified. Several important pieces of legislation were passed, including the Water Act and the Atmospheric Pollution Prevention Act.

The legislature, however, only responded to environmental concerns on an ad hoc basis, leading to a piece-meal effort.

==== 1970–1994 ====
The 1970s heralded an environmental watershed worldwide, with the publication of Rachel Carson's The Silent Spring in 1962, the Torrey Canyon Disaster of 1967, and Woodstock in 1970.

In South Africa, a variety of new laws were passed, and several novel concepts were introduced. Several important Acts were also updated, including the Environment Conservation Act.

=== Post-1994 ===
In 1996, section 24 of the Constitution enshrined basic environmental rights. A strong theme in the current legal order is that of equitable access to resources.

In the late 1990s, South Africa ratified several international conventions relating to the environment. It also enacted the National Environmental Management Act (NEMA), which supplemented but did not entirely repeal the provisions of the Environment Conservation Act, some of which are still in force.

Other important recent legislation includes

- the National Water Act;
- the National Forests Act;
- the National Environmental Management: Protected Areas Act;
- the National Environmental Management: Biodiversity Act; and
- the Marine Living Resources Act.

== International environmental law ==
International law is made up of:

- international conventions (or treaties);
- international custom, as evidence of a general practice accepted as law;
- general principles of law as recognised by civilised nations; and
- judicial decisions and the writings of the most highly qualified publicists.

Most of this is applicable to South African environmental law, and is binding in South Africa.

=== Impact on South African law ===
International environmental law has had a considerable influence on South African environmental law. The former is usually incorporated into the latter in one of three ways:

1. by incorporation of the provisions of the treaty into an Act of Parliament;
2. by including the treaty as a schedule to a statute; and
3. by proclamation by the executive in the Government Gazette, under the authorisation of a particular Act, giving the executive the power to bring the treaty into effect.

==== Constitution ====
See Chapter 14 of the Constitution and Chapter 6 of NEMA.

== Constitution ==
=== s 24 ===
Section 24 of the Constitution explicitly grants environmental rights to "everyone."

==== s 24(a) ====
Section 24(a) grants everyone the right to an environment that is not harmful to their health. This goes beyond the right of access to healthcare, established in section 27 of the Constitution, as a particular environment may be damaging to one's health and yet not on infringe on one's right of access to healthcare. In Verstappen v Port Edward Town Board, where the plaintiff sought an interdict on the ground that she was suffering health problems due to the local council's dumping waste, without the requisite permit, on the adjoining property, she might have invoked section 24, but did not.

The right to an environment that is not harmful to one's "well-being," the second aspect of subsection 24(a), "elevates the right beyond health but to a not readily determinable realm," writes Glazewski. He takes the word "well-being" to imply "that the environment has not only an instrumental value [...], but that in addition, aspects of the environment [...] are derserving of conservation for their intrinsic value."

The ambit of "well-being" is potentially limitless, but is clearly relevant to pollution. It was invoked in Hichange Investments v Cape Produce Company, where Leach J opined,

One should not be obliged to work in an environment of stench and, in my view, to be in an environment contaminated by H2S [as it was in casu] is adverse to one's 'well-being.'"

It may be argued that what constitutes "well-being" is relative to the nature and personality of the person seeking to assert this right, and that it will be decided on the facts of the particular case. Leach J concurs: "The assessment of what is significant involves, in my view, a considerable measure of subjective import."

==== s 24(b) ====
Section 24(b) states that the government must use "reasonable legislative and other measures" to protect the environment.

Glazewski argues that "the government has clearly complied" with the constitutional injunction to take legislative measures: It has enacted "a plethora of environmental legislation and accompanying regulations since 1994."

The meaning of "reasonable [...] other measures" was considered in the context of the environmental right in BP Southern Africa v MEC for Agriculture, Conservation & Land Affairs, where the court determined that it is up to the courts to determine what measures are reasonable.

===== s 24(b)(i) =====
Section 24(b)(i) requires these measures to "prevent pollution and ecological degradation." This leads to the question: What degree of pollution should be tolerated in a developing country like South Africa? This issue was highlighted in Hichange Investments, where Leach J considered what constitutes "significant pollution." He answered, that "the assessment [...] involves [...] a considerable measure of subjective import," and referred to the right to an environment that is not harmful to one's well-being.

===== s 24(b)(ii) =====
Section 24(b)(ii) requires these measures to "promote conservation." This is satisfied by "the various statutory obligations on the state contained in the vast array of environmental statutes and regulations enacted before and after 1994."

===== s 24(b)(iii) =====
Section 24(b)(iii) requires "measures that [...] secure ecologically sustainable development and use of natural resources while promoting justifiable economic and social development."

In Minister of Public Works v Kyalami Ridge Environmental Association, where the government sought to establish a transit camp for people rendered homeless as a result of severe flooding, the court found that, in effect, the government's duty to fulfil its obligations in terms of the right to housing trumped other legal claims, including the environmental concerns of the respondents.

The notion that sustainable development is an inherent factor to be considered in environmental decision-making was specifically endorsed in BP Southern Africa v MEC for Agriculture, Conservation & Land Affairs:

The concept of "sustainable development" is the fundamental building block around which environmental legal norms have been fashioned, both internationally and in South Africa, and is reflected in section 24(b)(iii) of the constitution [sic].

Pure economic principles will no longer determine in an unbridled fashion whether a development is acceptable. Development, which may be regarded as economically and financially sound, will in future be balanced by its environmental impact, taking coherent cognisance of the principle of intergenerational equity and sustainable use of resources in order to arrive at an integrated management of the environment, sustainable development and socio-economic concerns.

=== s 25 ===
Section 25 of the Constitution guarantees property rights, which Glazewski states is fundamentally linked to environmental concerns.

Property rights are not absolute; owners may not use their property as they please.

A central question is the extent to which private property rights may be limited in the public environmental interest, and when compensation is triggered if they are so limited. This tension has always been present in South African law; it is now more acute in view of the relatively recent recognition of environmental rights. In Diepsloot Residents' & Landowners Association v Administrator, Transvaal, a landowners' association challenged the administrator's decision to settle squatters near a residential area, on the grounds that this decision constituted an unwarranted interference with its property rights. The landowners contended that these property rights included an environmental component: The settlement would pollute the water and air. Their application was dismissed, however, on numerous grounds.

In BP Southern Africa v MEC for Agriculture, Conservation & Land Affairs, the court found that:

the constitutional right to environment is on a par with the rights to freedom of trade, occupation, profession and property entrenched in sections 22 and 25 of the Constitution. In any dealings with the physical expressions of property, land and freedom to trade, the environmental rights requirements should be part and parcel of the factors to be considered without any a priori grading of the rights. It will require a balancing of rights where competing interests and norms are concerned.

=== s 32 ===
Section 32 accords "everyone" the right to access information. This echoes Principle 10 of the Rio Declaration, which provides as follows:

Environmental issues are best handled with the participation of all concerned citizens at the relevant level. At the national level, each individual shall have appropriate access to information concerning the environment that is held by public authorities, including information on hazardous materials and activities in their communities, and the opportunity to participate in decision-making processes. States shall facilitate and encourage public awareness and participation by making information widely available.

=== s 33 ===
The Constitution also provides that "everyone has the right to administrative action that is lawful, reasonable and procedurally fair," and that "everyone whose rights have been adversely affected by administrative action has the right to be given written reasons." It requires that national legislation, enacted "to give effect to these rights," must

- "provide for the review of administrative action by a court or, where appropriate, an independent and impartial tribunal;"
- "impose a duty on the state to give effect to the rights" above; and
- "promote an efficient administration."

Section 1(5) of NEMA, inserted by section 1 of the National Environmental Management Amendment Act, and effective from 1 May 2009, provides that

any administrative process conducted or decision taken in terms of this Act must be conducted or taken in accordance with the Promotion of Administrative Justice Act [...] unless otherwise provided for in this Act.

In terms of the Promotion of Administrative Justice Act (PAJA), "administrative action" refers to "any decision taken, or any failure to take a decision, by

- "an organ of state, when
  - "exercising a power in terms of the Constitution or a provincial constitution; or
  - "exercising a public power or performing a public function in terms of any legislation; or
- "a natural or juristic person, other than an organ of state, when exercising a public power or performing a public function in terms of an empowering provision,

"which adversely affects the rights of any person and which has a direct, external legal effect." The provision goes on to list those actions which are not included in the definition of "administrative action."

An "administrator" is defined in PAJA is "an organ of state or any natural or juristic person taking administrative action."

A "decision," meanwhile, means "any decision of an administrative nature made, proposed to be made, or required to be made, as the case may be, under an empowering provision, including a decision relating to

- "making, suspending, revoking or refusing to make an order, award or determination;
- "giving, suspending, revoking or refusing to give a certificate, direction, approval, consent or permission;
- "issuing, suspending, revoking or refusing to issue a licence, authority or other instrument;
- "imposing a condition or restriction;
- "making a declaration, demand or requirement;
- "retaining, or refusing to deliver up, an article; or
- "doing or refusing to do any other act or thing of an administrative nature, and a reference to a failure to take a decision must be construed accordingly."

An "empowering provision" is "a law, a rule of common law, customary law, or an agreement, instrument or other document in terms of which an administrative action was purportedly taken."

==== Procedural fairness ====
Fundamental to administrative decision-making, and to the right to just administrative action, is procedural fairness, referred to in section 33(1) of the Bill of Rights. It has been taken up by PAJA, which provides that "administrative action which materially and adversely affects the rights or legitimate expectations of any person must be procedurally fair."

Inherent in procedural fairness is the common-law audi alteram partem rule: "Hear the other side." Its application is illustrated in The Director: Mineral Development, Gauteng Region v Save the Vaal Environment, where the applicant had granted a mining licence to carry out open-cast mining near the Vaal river. The respondent, an environmental NGO, which had not been permitted to make representations prior to the granting of the permit, applied successfully to the High Court for a review of the decision. The question on appeal before the Supreme Court of Appeal was whether (and, if so at what point) interested parties wishing to oppose a mining licence application on environmental grounds were entitled to be heard by the Director. The court rejected the Director's argument that section 9 of the Minerals Act excluded the application of the audi alteram partem rule, finding that the respondent should have been granted a hearing when the licence decision was made.

==== Right to reasons ====
The importance of right to reasons for an administrative action, whether generally or in the environmental context, was well known before the advent of section 33 of the Bill of Rights and section 5 of PAJA, where the right is now entrenched. Lawrence Baxter in 1984, in his textbook on administrative law, provided a précis of the right's importance:

In the first place, a duty to give reasons entails a duty to rationalise the decision. Reasons therefore help to structure the exercise of discretion, and the necessity of explaining why a decision is reached requires one to address one's mind to the decisional referents which ought to be taken into account. Secondly, furnishing reasons satisfies an important desire on the part of the affected individual to know why a decision was reached. This is not only fair: it is also conducive to public confidence in the administrative decision-making process. Thirdly—and probably a major reason for the reluctance to give reasons—rational criticism of a decision may only be made when the reasons for it are known. This subjects the administration to public scrutiny and it also provides an important basis for appeal or review. Finally, reasons may serve a genuine educative purpose, for example where an applicant has been refused on grounds which he is able to correct for the purpose of future applications.

Section 5 of PAJA gives effect to the constitutional imperative in section 33(2) for written reasons in the following terms:

Any person whose rights have been materially and adversely affected by administrative action and who has not been given reasons for the action may, within 90 days after the date on which that person became aware of the action or might reasonably have been expected to have become aware of the action, request that the administrator concerned furnish written reasons for the action.

The rest of section 5 sets out the procedures for obtaining reasons; it also sets out the circumstances in which reasons need not be furnished by the administrator concerned. "This section is welcome," writes Glazewski, "as it lays down for the first time the right to reasons in clear statutory terms."

The importance of the right to reasons in the environmental context is illustrated in Administrator, Transvaal and The Firs Investments (Pty) Ltd v Johannesburg City Council, concerning opposition to the then-controversial proposal to rezone a residential area to business, in order to enable the establishment of what today is the Firs Shopping centre in northern Johannesburg. On the question of reasons, Chief Justice Ogilivie Thompson said the following:

The Administrator would have been well advised to state the reasons for his decision [...] for just as the failure of a party to testify on a matter within his knowledge may, under certain circumstances, give rise to an inference against him, so may the failure to give reasons for the decision constitute an adverse element in assessing the conduct of the person making that decision. In particular [...] the failure to furnish reasons may—I emphasise "may" not "must"—add colour to an inference of arbitrariness.

Reasons for administrative decision-making in the environmental context were also in issue in Minister of Environmental Affairs and Tourism v Phambili Fisheries (hereafter referred to as "Phambili 1"). The first respondent, a fishing company, feeling aggrieved by the inadequacy of the fishing quota allocated to it, contended that inadequate reasons had been given regarding the historical baseline used to allocate current quotas. The court dismissed the argument, quoting an Australian decision in which it was held that

the [Australian] Judicial Review Act requires the decision-maker to explain his decision in a way which will enable a person aggrieved to say, in effect: "Even though I may not agree with it, I now understand why the decision went against me. I am now in a position to decide whether that decision has involved an unwarranted finding of fact, or an error of law, which is worth challenging." This requires that the decision-maker should set out his understanding of the relevant law, any findings a fact on which his conclusions depend (especially if those facts have been in dispute), and the reasoning processes which led him to those conclusions. He should do so in clear and unambiguous language, not in vague generalities or the formal language of legislation.

The court also quoted Cora Hoexter, a leading authority on South African administrative law, to the effect that

it is apparent that reasons are not really reasons unless they are properly informative. They must explain why action was taken or not taken; otherwise they are better described as findings or other information.

The court applied these dicta to the respondents' contention that the reasons given were no reasons at all in respect of the question regarding the historical baseline used, and dismissed the contention, holding that "a fair reading of the reasons makes it clear that the Chief Director, suitably assisted, in the exercise of his discretion, decided that an appropriate percentage for the diminution of quotas at the end of 2001 was 5%," and satisfied itself that adequate reasons had been given for the administrative decisions taken in this instance.

==== Legitimate expectations ====
Section 3 of PAJA, quoted above, applies procedural fairness not only to the "rights of persons," but also to situations where there may be "legitimate expectations."

Legitimate expectation is relevant in the environmental context: for example, in the marine fisheries domain, where legal persons, having had regular fishing quotas in the past, may now be granted a lesser quota; conversely, a historically disadvantaged person may expect to receive a quota in the new dispensation.

This issue, as well as a number of other administrative law principles, were considered relatively recently, in just such a fisheries-allocation question, by both the Supreme Court of Appeal, in Phambili 1, and the Constitutional Court, in Bato Star Fishing v Minister of Environmental Affairs (referred to hereinafter as "Phambili 2").

Historically, however, the leading case on legitimate expectation is Administrator, Transvaal v Traub where a group of medical doctors successfully argued that they had a legitimate expectation that their posts would be confirmed. Chief Justice Corbett, quoting with approval Lord Denning's judgment in Ridge v Baldwin, held

that an administrative body may, in a proper case, be bound to give a person who is affected by their decision an opportunity of making representations. It all depends on whether he has some right or interest, or, I would add, some legitimate expectation, of which it would not be fair to deprive him without hearing what he has to say.

Later in the judgment, the Chief Justice described the doctrine of legitimate expectation as follows:

The legitimate expectations doctrine is sometimes expressed in terms of some substantive benefit or advantage or privilege which the person concerned could reasonably expect to acquire or retain and which it would be unfair to deny such person without prior consultation or a prior hearing; and at other times in terms of a legitimate expectation to be accorded a hearing before some decision adverse to the interests of the person concerned is taken.

In Phambili 1, the respondent argued that it had a legitimate expectation that it would receive increased allocations under the quota system for hake fishing. The Supreme Court of Appeal considered the legitimate-expectation doctrine, noting with approval National Director of Public Prosecutions v Phillips, where Heher J described the doctrine in the following terms:

The law does not protect every expectation but only those which are "legitimate". The requirements for legitimacy of the expectation, include the following: (i) The representation underlying the expectation must be "clear, unambiguous and devoid of relevant qualification" [....] The requirement is a sensible one. It accords with the principle of fairness in public administration, fairness both to the administration and the subject. It protects public officials against the risk that their unwitting ambiguous statements may create legitimate expectations. It is also not unfair to those who choose to rely on such statements. It is always open to them to seek clarification before they do so, failing which they act at their peril. (ii) The expectation must be reasonable [....] (iii) The representation must have been induced by the decision-maker [....] (iv) The representation must be one which it was competent and lawful for the decision-maker to make without which the reliance cannot be legitimate.

Applying the above principles to the case in point, the court dismissed the argument that the appellants had a legitimate expectation on the ground that the various statements made by government officials regarding the allocation of fishing quotas did not amount to statements which were "clear, unambiguous and devoid of relevant qualification."

==== Judicial review ====
===== Promotion of Administrative Justice Act (PAJA) =====
The grounds of judicial review have been codified in section 6(2) of PAJA. Grounds for judicial review will exist if the administrator who took the administrative action

"was not authorised to do so by the empowering provision; "acted under a delegation of power which was not authorised by the empowering provision; or "was biased or reasonably suspected of bias."

Judicial review will also be possible if

- "a mandatory and material procedure or condition prescribed by an empowering provision was not complied with;
- "the action was procedurally unfair; or
- "the action was materially influenced by an error of law."

If the action was taken

- "for a reason not authorised by the empowering provision;
- "for an ulterior purpose or motive;
- "because irrelevant considerations were taken into account or relevant considerations were not considered;
- "because of the unauthorised or unwarranted dictates of another person or body;
- "in bad faith; or
- "arbitrarily or capriciously,"

the courts will be entitled to review such action. They may do so, too, if "the action itself contravenes a law or is not authorised by the empowering provision," or if it "is not rationally connected to

- "the purpose for which it was taken;
- "the purpose of the empowering provision;
- "the information before the administrator."

Finally, judicial review is possible if

- "the action concerned consists of a failure to take a decision;
- "the exercise of the power or the performance of the function authorised by the empowering provision, in pursuance of which the administrative action was purportedly taken, is so unreasonable that no reasonable person could have so exercised the power or performed the function; or
- "the action is otherwise unconstitutional or unlawful."

Section 8(1) of PAJA provides for remedies in judicial-review proceedings in the following terms: "The court or tribunal, in proceedings for judicial review [...], may grant any order that is just and equitable, including orders

- "directing the administrator
  - "to give reasons; or
  - "to act in the manner the court or tribunal requires;
- "prohibiting the administrator from acting in a particular manner;
- "setting aside the administrative action and
  - "remitting the matter for reconsideration by the administrator, with or without directions; or
  - "in exceptional cases
    - "substituting or varying the administrative action or correcting a defect resulting from the administrative action; or
    - "directing the administrator or any other party to the proceedings to pay compensation;
- "declaring the rights of the parties in respect of any matter to which the administrative action relates;
- "granting a temporary interdictor other temporary relief; or
- "as to costs."

===== Common law =====
In the environmental context, litigation around the enforcement of statutory duties arises in two broad ways:

1. An application may be brought to compel the exercise of a statutory duty: for example, for the Minister to declare an environmental policy or to allocate fishing quotas.
2. A plaintiff may seek some form of relief, like compensation for harm suffered due to the failure by the government to carry out a statutory duty.

====== Compelling exercise of statutory duty ======
Regard must be had to whether the provision imposing the duty is peremptory or permissive.

A question in Van Huyssteen NO v Minister of Environmental Affairs and Tourism, concerning the erection of a steel mill at Langebaan Lagoon, was whether or not the applicant had the right to compel the respondent Minister to appoint a Board of Investigation provided for in section 15(1) of the Environmental Conservation Act (ECA), and to order such appointment. It was held that, as the relevant provisions of the ECA were permissive, not directory or peremptory, there was no obligation on the Minister to appoint a Board. The applicants accordingly had no right to compel the constitution thereof.

In Wildlife Society of Southern Africa v Minister of Environmental Affairs and Tourism of the Republic of South Africa, the court held, as regards the merits of an application for a mandamus compelling the State to comply with its statutory obligations to protect the environment, that the first respondent's opposition to the application rested largely upon the fact that there was in existence a Task Group which had been established to tackle the issue. The court found, however, that the Task Group was a non-statutory, advisory body of uncertain nature and duration, whose actions had in any event fallen short of establishing that the provisions of section 39(2) of the Transkei Environmental Decree were being enforced by first respondent. The Court held, accordingly, that the applicants were entitled to an order that the first respondent enforce the provisions of section 39(2) of the Decree, which were, as "degree" implies, peremptory rather than permissive.

====== Relief ======
An example of the second scenario is Verstappen v Port Edward Town Board, where the plaintiff sought an interdict on the ground that she was suffering health problems, as the local authority was dumping waste on the adjoining property without the requisite permit. The case (heard prior to the advent of the interim Constitution) failed, as the applicant not shown that she was likely to suffer "special damage."

=== s 38 ===
The use of word "everyone" in the environmental right raises the issue of locus standi, traditionally a serious obstacle to individual litigants or NGOs concerned with the implementation and enforcement of environmental laws, or those wishing to assert environmental rights or defend environmental actions. South African law, in common with many other legal systems, formerly required that to have legal standing to challenge administrative lawfulness, an individual must show that he had some degree of personal interest in the administrative action under challenge.

Section 38 of the Constitution dramatically changed this. The following persons, among others, may approach a competent court:

- anyone acting as a member of, or in the interest of, a group or class of persons;
- anyone acting in the public interest; and
- an association acting in the interest of its members.

Most importantly, litigation may now also be brought in the public interest.

== Administration ==
=== Co-operative governance ===
Government in South Africa, as in most modern states, is divided broadly into three branches:

- the legislative;
- the executive; and
- the judicial.

The Constitution sets the framework for these three branches.

Of particular practical importance for the administration of environmental laws are the respective powers of the national, provincial and local levels of government. "Co-operative governance" refers to and regulates the interrelationship between these levels.

Chapter 3 of the Constitution, entitled "Co-operative government," reflects a "fundamental departure from the past," in that the three levels of government are "no longer regarded as hierarchical tiers with the national government at the helm," but rather, in the words of the Constitution, as "distinctive, interdependent and interrelated."

Co-operative relationships between all spheres of government play a central role in the development of an integrated environmental management framework for South Africa.

Section 41 of the Constitution sets out the principles of co-operative governance and intergovernmental relations. Particularly important are subsections 41(1)(g)-(h), which provides that all levels of government, and all organs of state, must

- "exercise their powers and perform their functions in a manner that does not encroach on the geographical, functional or institutional integrity of government in another sphere; and
- "co-operate with one another in mutual trust and good faith by
  - "fostering friendly relations;
  - "assisting and supporting one another;
  - "informing one another of, and consulting one another on, matters of common interest;
  - "co-ordinating their actions and legislation with one another;
  - "adhering to agreed procedures; and
  - "avoiding legal proceedings against one another."

Section 41(3) provides that "an organ of state involved in an intergovernmental dispute must make every reasonable effort to settle the dispute by means of mechanisms and procedures provided for that purpose, and must exhaust all other remedies before it approaches a court to resolve the dispute."

Section 43 of the Constitution also states "the legislative authority

- "of the national sphere of government is vested in Parliament, as set out in section 44;
- "of the provincial sphere of government is vested in the provincial legislatures, as set out in section 104; and
- "of the local sphere of government is vested in the Municipal Councils, as set out in section 156."

All three levels of government, write Paterson and Kotze,

have a key role to play in environmental governance and, accordingly, environmental compliance and enforcement. However, this role has to a degree been undermined by significant overlap in their respective competences, which, during the course of the past decade, has resulted in legislative and institutional fragmentation, both within and between the different spheres of governance. This fragmentation has in turn led to functional duplication and confusion, an undesirable reality in a country with significant resource constraints.

Co-operative governance is accordingly regarded as "a necessary precursor" for the development of an effective environmental compliance and enforcement effort in South Africa.

==== National authority ====
National executive authority is vested in the President who, together with his Cabinet, must implement national legislation, develop and implement national policy, co-ordinate the functions of state departments and administrations, prepare and initiate legislation, and perform any other executive function provided for in law. The Cabinet consists of the President, a Deputy President and the Ministers. The members of the Cabinet must, inter alia, act in accordance with the Constitution and provide Parliament with full and regular reports concerning matters under their control.

In the environmental context, the Minister of Environmental Affairs and Tourism, with his Department of Environmental Affairs and Tourism, constitutes the leading national environmental authority. There are a number of other ministries and departments which play a role in environmental governance. They include Agriculture, Foreign Affairs, Health, Housing, Justice and Constitutional Development, Land Affairs, Provincial and Local Government, Science and Technology, Transport, Minerals and Energy, Trade and Industry, and Water Affairs and Forestry. The fact that environmental matters fall within the jurisdiction of so many different ministries and departments "poses an immense challenge for developing a coherent and effective environmental regime in South Africa."

The national government's legislative authority is similarly prescribed in the Constitution. It has exclusive competence to make laws governing the following environmental matters:

- national parks;
- national botanical gardens;
- marine resources;
- fresh-water resources; and
- mining.

Furthermore, it has concurrent competence with provincial government to make laws regulating the following environmental matters:

- indigenous forests;
- agriculture;
- disaster management;
- cultural matters;
- environment;
- health services;
- housing;
- nature conservation;
- pollution control;
- regional planning and development;
- soil conservation;
- trade; and
- urban and rural development.

The national government has exercised this legislative authority to prescribe an extensive array of new environmental laws, such as

- NEMA;
- the National Environmental Managemeht: Biodiversity Act;
- the National Environmental Management: Air Quality Act;
- the National Environmental Management: Protected Areas Act;
- the National Water Act; and
- the Mineral and Petroleum Resources Development Act.

These laws, which apply across the entire territory of South Africa, and are generally administered by several national departments, contain a myriad of provisions of relevance to environmental compliance and enforcement.

National legislative and executive competence is provided for in section 44 of the Constitution, which states that Parliament may pass legislation on any matter, including a matter referred to in Schedule 4, but excluding a matter in Schedule 5 unless it is a matter in which it is specifically authorised to intervene. Among the reasons for which it may intervene within a functional area listed in Schedule 5 are the following, which are relevant to environmental concerns:

- "to maintain essential national standards;
- "to establish minimum standards required for the rendering of services; or
- "to prevent unreasonable action taken by a province which is prejudicial to the interests of another province or to the country as a whole."

It ought to be noted, however, that this may only be done in accordance with the procedure set out in section 76(1), which provides for ordinary bills affecting provinces, and stipulates that "the Bill must be referred to the National Council of Provinces." It provides for certain procedures, depending on whether the bill is accepted, amended or rejected by the NCOP.

Parliament therefore enjoys "residual competence," in that it has exclusive legislative competence in respect of all matters which are not expressly assigned to the concurrent or exclusive competence of provincial legislatures. If, in other words, the matter appears in neither Schedule 4 nor Schedule 5, Parliament has exclusive competence to deal with it.

Apart from section 44, intervention is also possible under the national override section, which deals with conflicts between national and provincial legislation falling within the functional areas of concurrent competences listed in Schedule 4. It provides that national legislation prevails over provincial legislation if the former meets certain stipulated conditions.

National legislation which applies uniformly across the nation will prevail over provincial legislation if it is necessary for "the protection of the environment."

Similarly, if the national legislation deals with a matter that requires uniformity if it is to be dealt with effectively, it will prevail over provincial legislation if it establishes uniform norms and standards, frameworks or national policy. Pollution control is a pertinent example.

If standards are not uniform throughout the country, individual provinces could pass, for example, less stringent standards for their individual provinces in order to attract industrial investment. This, however, could be detrimental to the national public environmental interest. "Uniform standards," notes Glazewski, "would inhibit a situation where polluting industries go 'polluter-haven shopping', for the provinces with the least stringent environmental standards."

==== Provincial authority ====
South Africa has nine provinces, each with its own provincial government, which possesses legislative and executive authority. The legislative authority of a province vests in its provincial legislature, which section 104 of the Constitution states may pass legislation not only in respect of the functional areas listed in Schedule 4 and 5, but also in respect of "any matter outside those functional areas, and that is expressly assigned to the province by national legislation."

Furthermore, "provincial legislation with regard to a matter that is reasonably necessary for, or incidental to, the effective exercise of a power concerning any matter listed in Schedule 4, is for all purposes legislation with regard to a matter listed in Schedule 4."

Provincial legislatures must provide for mechanisms to ensure that all provincial executive organs of state are accountable to it, and must maintain oversight of the exercise of provincial executive authority in the province, including the implementation of legislation.

The executive power in the principal sphere vests in the premier of the province, who exercises this authority together with the Members of the Executive Council (MECs).

Executive powers accorded to the provincial executives include

- implementing provincial legislation in the province;
- implementing all national legislation within the functional areas listed in Schedules 4 and 5 of the Constitution;
- developing and implementing provincial policy;
- co-ordinating the functions of the provincial administration and its departments; and
- preparing and initiating provincial legislation.

Possible conflicts which arise between national and provincial legislation are regulated in sections 146 to 150 of the Constitution.

The Constitution also enables relevant provincial executive authorities to intervene in local governance, where a municipality refrains from or fails to fulfil an executive obligation in terms of legislation, by taking any appropriate steps to ensure fulfilment of that obligation: "A typical example would be where provincial legislation compels all local governments within the province to draft a cultural heritage resources management plan, and a particular municipality fails to do so."

In most instances, MECs are responsible for the various provincial departments, certain of which undertake environmental functions. The manner in which these functions are grouped per department varies between the provinces:

- In Gauteng, for example, the Department of Agriculture, Conservation and Environment administers environmental matters.
- In the Western Cape, on the other hand, the Department of Environmental Affairs and Development Planning is the provincial environmental authority.

These provincial authorities administer

- various old provincial conservation and land-use planning ordinances;
- new provincial environmental Acts; and
- environmental functions delegated to them by the national executive.

They have "a key role to play," therefore, in environmental compliance and enforcement.

==== Local authority ====
Within the sphere of local government, South Africa has 284 municipalities. "As the sphere of government closest to communities," write Kotze and Paterson, "local government has an essential role to play in promoting not only socio-economic development and the provision of basic services, but also environmental compliance and enforcement" (33).

The Constitution prescribes the objectives, composition, executive powers and legislative functions of local governments. They generally have the right to govern, at their own initiative, the local affairs relevant to their community, subject to national and provincial legislation. National and provincial governments may not, however, compromise or impede a municipality's ability or right to exercise its powers or to perform its functions.

Some of the environmentally relevant areas over which local governments exercise legislative competence include

- building regulations;
- electricity and gas reticulation;
- municipal planning;
- specified water and sanitation services;
- cleansing;
- control of public nuisances;
- municipal roads;
- noise pollution;
- public places;
- refuse removal;
- refuse dumps; and
- solid waste disposal.

The Constitution goes on to set out the areas of local authority competence, stipulating that a municipality has executive authority and the right to administer

- local government matters listed in the respective Part Bs of Schedules 4 and 5, so that "air pollution," for example, being a Part-B item in Schedule 4, may be administered by local authorities; and
- "any other matter assigned to it by national or provincial legislation." In this regard, a further subsection stipulates that national and provincial government must assign, by agreement, the administration of any "Part A" matter listed in Schedules 4 and 5, if the matter would be more effectively administered locally and the municipality has the capacity to administer it.

Although section 156 of the Constitution refers to municipalities' "executive authority," and the "right to administer" certain matters, it specifically stipulates that "a municipality may make and administer by-laws for the effective administration of the matters which it has the right to administer."

Therefore, although the section does not refer specifically to a municipality's legislative competence, it may legislate for Part B matters of Schedules 4 and 5.

The Constitution requires provincial government to establish municipalities in a manner consistent with legislation prescribed in the Constitution, and to monitor, support and promote the development of local government capacity. National legislation, in the form of the Local Government: Municipal Structures Act 117 of 1998, which deals with local authority competences, has been passed.

The Constitution establishes three categories of municipalities:

1. A "Category A" municipality has exclusive municipal executive and legislative authority in area.
2. A "Category B" municipality shares municipal executive and legislative authority in its area with a "Category C" municipality.
3. A "Category C" municipality has municipal executive and legislative authority in an area that includes more than one municipality.

The Local Government: Municipal Structures Act elaborates on this categorisation, providing for "the establishment of municipalities in accordance with the requirements relating to categories and types of municipality," and seeks "to establish criteria for determining the category of municipality in an area and related matters." The Act includes chapters on

- categories and types of municipality;
- the establishment of municipalities; and
- the functions and powers of municipalities.

The Act was assented to in December 1998, and came into force in February 1999. In Cape Metropolitan Council v Minister for Provincial Affairs and Constitutional Development, the applicant challenged the constitutionality of the Act without success.

==== Schedules 4 and 5 ====
Schedules 4 and 5 of the Constitution include various environmental matters (See Glazewski 113).

Schedule 4 includes "Pollution control" under Part A, but "Air Pollution" under Part B, which also includes a further item relevant to pollution: "Municipal Health Services."

Schedule 5 includes "control of public nuisances" in Part B as one of its items, which is also relevant to pollution.

Therefore, while "pollution," and specifically "air pollution," generally is a concurrent matter, the inclusion of "air pollution" in Part B of Schedule 4 means that local authorities have specific executive authority and the right of administration in respect of that matter.

Moreover, the national and provincial governments have a duty to see to the effective performance by municipalities of their functions.

As "pollution" and "air pollution" are designated concurrent matters in Schedule 4, either national or provincial government could conceivably promulgate air pollution Acts.

The Constitution is clear, however, that national government has overriding powers as regards the setting of standards. Where uniform standards are warranted, national government could invoke the provisions of the Constitution which deal with conflicting laws.

The so-called override provision, which specifically applies to conflicts between national and provincial legislation within the functional areas listed in Schedule 4, provides that national legislation prevails over provincial legislation if the former "deals with a matter that, to be dealt with effectively, requires uniformity across the nation, and the national legislation provides that uniformity by establishing [...] norms and standards." This is particularly relevant to the prevention of "polluter-haven shopping."

Furthermore, national legislation which applies uniformly across the nation prevails over provincial legislation if it is necessary for "the protection of the environment."

The differentiation between Parts A and B of Schedules 4 and 5 has to do with the respective roles of provinces and local authorities in administering the items listed in these respective parts of the two schedules.

Municipalities have executive authority and the right to administer the local-government matters listed in Part B of both Schedules 4 and 5, and the right to make and administer by-laws in this regard. They also have this right in respect of those matters specifically assigned to them by national or provincial legislation. Furthermore, Part A matters which relate to local government must be assigned to municipalities if the matter would most effectively be administered locally, and if the municipality has the capacity to administer it.

It follows from all this that either national government or provincial governments are to administer pollution laws generally, but that, in the case of air pollution, local authorities have the right to do so.

The question of the respective competence of national and provincial governments in respect of Schedules 4 and 5 has not yet been considered by the courts in an environmental matter, but analogies may be drawn from the case of Ex parte the President of the Republic of South Africa, In re: Constitutionality of the Liquor Bill. "Liquor licences" are specifically mentioned in Schedule 5, but "trade" and "industrial promotion" appear in Schedule 4: They are concurrent matters, therefore. The question considered by Cameron J in the Constitutional Court was whether or not the override provision, applied in casu, gives national government the competence to enact legislation on various facets of the liquor trade. After a thorough analysis of the position the court pointed out that

Where a matter requires regulation inter-provincially, as opposed to intra-provincially, the Constitution ensures that national government has been accorded the necessary power, whether exclusively or concurrently under Schedule 4, or through the powers of intervention accorded by section 44(2). The corrolorary is that where provinces are accorded exclusive powers these should be interpreted as applying primarily to matters which may appropriately be regulated intra-provincially.

The court found the Bill to be unconstitutional because, while the national government had made out a case for intervening in crediting a national system of registration for manufacturers aid and wholesale distributors of liquor, no such case had been made out in the case of retail sales of liquor.

"In summary," writes Glazewski,

in considering the question of who does what, the starting point is that national level of government enjoys exclusive competence with respect to all matters which are not expressly assigned to the concurrent or exclusive competence of provincial legislatures, but the provinces have only those powers and functions specifically allocated to them by the Constitution.

==== Mechanisms ====
The Constitution specifically prescribes a set of principles of cooperative governance and intergovernmental relations. The Intergovernmental Relations Framework Act (IRFA) contains detailed provisions on co-operative governance, while NEMA prescribes an array of statutory mechanisms for achieving co-operative environmental governance, such as a set of national environmental management principles, planning frameworks and procedures for conflict resolution.

Notwithstanding the above array of provisions, "some commentators are of the view that that these mechanisms will not achieve cooperative governance unless they are accompanied by the requisite political will" (Paterson and Kotze 34).

===== Intergovernmental Relations Framework Act =====
IRFA is the primary Act on co-operative governance. Its specific objectives include

- facilitating and co-ordinating the implementation of policy and legislation, including coherent government;
- monitoring such implementation;
- providing for effective services; and
- realising national priorities.

When read together with the conflict-resolution procedures prescribed in NEMA, IRFA "should significantly contribute to resolving disputes arising as a result of environmental governance inefficiencies" (Paterson and Kotze 124).

===== National Environmental Management Act =====
The long title of NEMA describes its purpose below:

"To provide for co-operative environmental governance by establishing principles for decision-making on matters affecting the environment, institutions that will promote cooperative governance and procedures for co-ordinating environmental functions exercised by organs of state;

- "to provide for certain aspects of the administration and enforcement of other environmental management laws; and
- "to provide for matters connected therewith."

Chapter 3 of NEMA, entitled "Procedures for Co-operative Governance," provides for the drawing up of environmental implementation plans by certain scheduled national government departments and provinces. These reflect how the activities of the organ of state affect the environment (s 13).

In addition, environmental management plans shall be drawn up by certain other scheduled national departments. These reflect how the respective functions of the departments listed involve the management of the environment (s 14).

These plans are one of the principle ways of implementing the set of principles contained in section 2 of the Act.

All provinces, and only those national government departments listed in Schedules 1 and 2, have to carry out environmental implementation and/or management plans.

- Schedule 1 lists national government departments which exercise functions which "may affect the environment." These have to prepare environmental implementation plans.
- Schedule 2 lists national departments exercising functions that "involve the management of the environment". These have to prepare environmental management plans.

"It is accordingly evident," writes Glazewski,

that a primary focus of the Act is not to impose a set of burdensome requirements on the private sector but to design a national environmental management system applicable to certain organs of state whether at national, provincial, and possibly local level. The private sector, however, will obviously be influenced indirectly thereby" (143).

The following departments are listed in both Schedules 1 and 2:

- the Department of Environmental Affairs and Tourism;
- the Department of Water Affairs and Forestry; and
- the Department of Land Affairs.

These, accordingly, have to carry out both environmental implementation and environmental management plans, but the two sets of plans may be consolidated.

The following departments are listed only in Schedule 1, and therefore have to prepare only environmental implementation plans:

- Agriculture;
- Housing;
- Trade and Industry;
- Transport; and
- Defence.

The following are listed only in Schedule 2 and therefore have to prepare only environmental management plans:

- Minerals and Energy;
- Health; and
- Labour.

Glazewski notes that, although the Department of Minerals and Energy is listed in Schedule 2, its activities clearly "affect the environment," and should therefore logically fall into Schedule 1 (143).

The provinces have to prepare environmental implementation plans only.

Local authorities do not appear to be directly affected by these requirements.

Both implementation and management plans have to be prepared within one year of the promulgation of the Act, and every four years thereafter.

The purpose of both environmental implementation and environmental management plans is set out in some detail. In essence, these plans must

- give effect to the principle of co-operative governance;
- give preference to national rather than provincial interests where the latter are unreasonable or prejudicial to the interests of the country as a whole;
- enable the Minister to monitor the achievement, promotion and protection of sustainable environment; and
- co-ordinate and harmonise environmental policies, plans, programmes and decisions of national, provincial and local tiers of government to minimise duplication and promote consistency. "A confusing point," notes Glazewski, "is that this subsection refers to 'functions that may affect the environment,' implying that it only refers to Schedule 1 departments. However," he continues, "this phrase is wide enough to embrace functions involving the 'management of the environment', that is Schedule 2 departments as well" (144).

These guidelines appear to give a wide discretion to those charged with drawing up these plans (Glazewski 144).

One of the differences between environmental implementation plans and environmental management plans is illustrated by sections 13 and 14, which set out the contents of environmental management plans and environmental implementation plans respectively.

Another difference between the two kinds of plans is evident in the two headings of Schedules 1 and 2. Schedule 1 is applicable to national departments exercising functions "which may affect the environment", while Schedule 2 refers to national departments that exercise functions that "involve the management of the environment."

The environmental implementation plan should reflect how the activities of the particular organ of state affect the environment. To this end, the relevant section provides that it must contain:

- a description of policies, plans and programmes that may significantly affect the environment;
- a description of the manner in which the relevant national department or province will ensure that its policies, plans and programmes will comply with the principles set out in section 2, as well as any national norms and standards as envisaged under section 146(2)(b)(i) of the Constitution and set out by the Minister or by any other Minister, which have as their objective the achievement, promotion, and protection of the environment;
- a description of the manner in which the relevant national department or province will ensure that its functions are exercised so as to ensure compliance with relevant legislative provisions, including the principles set out in section 2, and any national norms and standards envisaged under section 146 (2)(b)(i) of the Constitution and set out by the Minister, or by any other Minister, which are in accordance with the same objective described above; and
- recommendations for the promotion of the objectives and plans for the implementation of integrated environmental management procedure and regulations referred to in Chapter 5 of the Act. "This," according to Glazewski, "is a particularly significant provision as it places the onus of compliance with the integrated environmental assessment procedures squarely in the court of the provinces and listed sectoral ministries" (145).

Environmental management plans should in contrast reflect how the respective functions of the departments listed in Schedule 2 "involve the management of the environment."

"Clearly," writes Glazewski, "this is onerous than is the case with environmental implementation plans."

The relevant section provides that the contents of environmental management plans must include:

- a description of the functions exercised by the relevant department in respect of the environment;
- a description of environmental norms and standards, including norms and standards contemplated in section 146(2)(b)(i) of the Constitution, set or applied by the relevant department;
- a description of the policies, plans and programmes of the relevant department that are designed to ensure compliance with its policies by other organs of state and persons;
- a description of priorities regarding compliance with the relevant department's policies by other organs of state and persons;
- a description of the extent of compliance with the relevant department's policies by other organs of state and persons;
- a description of arrangements for co-operation with other national departments and spheres of government, including any existing or proposed memoranda of understanding entered into, or delegation or assignment of powers to other organs of state, with a bearing on environmental management; and
- proposals for the promotion of the objectives and plans for the implementation of the procedures and regulations referred to in Chapter 5 of the Act.

Although the two sets of plans are "very similar," Glazewski notes what he describes as "a significant difference," which is that "the implementation plans have to set out how they will give effect to the section 2 principles while management plans do not" (145).

Both must be submitted for approval to the Minister or MEC, as the case may be (s 15(1)).

Both have to comply with the norms-and-standards provisions of section 146(2)(b)(i) of the Constitution, which requires uniformity across the country.

Both environmental management plans and environmental implementation plans must be submitted to the Committee for Environmental Co-ordination (the CEC).

In the case of environmental implementation plans, the CEC must scrutinise these and either adopt them, or report to the Minister of Environment and every other responsible Minister that they do not comply with certain stipulated criteria.

Where the CEC agrees to the adoption of an environmental implementation plan, the plan must be published in the Government Gazette by the relevant organ of state within ninety days of such adoption, whereupon it becomes effective.

If the CEC finds that the plan does not comply with the principles in section 2, the purpose and objectives of such environmental implementation plans, or any relevant environmental management plan, this fact must be reported to the Minister of Environment and every other responsible Minister.

In the event of a dispute concerning the content or submission of an environmental implementation plan, this must be submitted to the Minister of Environment in consultation with the other Schedule 2 Ministers for determination by him or her, where a national department is concerned.

Where such a dispute concerns a province, it must be submitted to the Director-General for conciliation in accordance with the procedure set out in Chapter 4 of the Act.

Although environmental management plans are submitted to the CEC, they are not subject to scrutiny by the CEC, but must simply be published in the Gazette within ninety days of such submission, whereupon they become effective.

Section 16 provides for compliance with these plans in different ways. Firstly, it obliges organs of state which have prepared these plans to exercise all their functions in accordance with them. Secondly, all organs of state are obliged to submit their plans to the Director-General and the Committee annually.

Where the plans have not been submitted or adopted, the Minister may recommend that it comply after consultation with the Committee.

The Director-General is charged with monitoring compliance with the environmental implementation and management plans, and may make inquiries or take other appropriate steps to establish whether or not the plans are being complied with.

Where the plans are not being substantially complied with, the Director-General may serve a written notice on the organ state concerned to remedy the failure of compliance. The organ of state must respond within thirty days. If it fails to do so, the Director-General may "specify steps and a time period within which steps must be taken to remedy the failure of compliance."

If thereafter the non-compliance persists, the matter must go to conciliation in accordance with Chapter 4 of the Act.

Finally, each provincial department must ensure that the relevant environmental implementation plan is complied with by each municipality in its province.

The Director-General is obliged to keep a record of all environmental implementation and management plans, and make them available to the public.

Guidelines may be published by the Minister to assist provinces in the preparation of these plans.

Of particular relevance to this process is the fact that the preparation of these plans may "consist of the assembly of information or plans compiled for other purposes." Integrated Development Plans would fall into this category.

==== Environmental implementation plans ====
Environmental implementation plans should reflect how the activities of a particular organ of state affect the environment, focusing on the ways in which general policies and functions take account of environmental management.

Environmental implementation plans are the primary statutory instruments for the promotion of cooperative governance around environmental management, through the alignment of governmental policies, plans and programmes and decisions in respect of the environment.

Their content is prescribed in section 13.

==== Environmental management plans ====
Environmental management plans should reflect how the respective functions of the departments listed involve management of the environment. They should focus on policies and mechanisms to ensure that other bodies comply with the departments' environmental management mandate.

An environmental management plan is defined as "an environmental management tool used to ensure that undue or reasonably avoidable adverse impacts of the construction, operation and decommissioning of a project are prevented; and that the positive benefits of the projects are enhanced."

They are, therefore, very important tools for ensuring that the management actions arising from EIA processes are clearly defined and implemented through all phases of the project life-cycle.

Their content is prescribed in section 13.

See Maccsand v City of Cape Town.

==== Implementation compliance and enforcement ====
"In principle," write Paterson and Kotze, "environmental compliance and enforcement are about ensuring adherence to statutorily prescribed environmental standards." They add,

The historical application of unjust and discriminatory laws has unquestionably undermined the development of a culture of legal compliance and accordingly clouded the application of the rule of law in South Africa, a reality compounded by inadequate legal enforcement. This has negatively affected the environmental sector, and the extent of environmental non-compliance with South Africa's environmental legal framework is accordingly not surprising.

Elements of both the rationalist and normative theories of compliance are evident in South Africa's current environmental regime. Historically, wildlife and conservation authorities adopted a rationalist approach, relying on the deterrence theory, with enforcement being very much secured through arrest and criminal prosecution. On the other hand, compliance and enforcement in the industrial sector, "perhaps under the influence of large corporations," has focused more on the normative theory, adopting "a far more conciliatory approach to compliance and enforcement."

This approach to environmental compliance and enforcement "appears to have shifted somewhat in recent times. There is a current trend inherent in the conservation sector," observe Paterson and Kotze, "to entrench a more normative approach focusing on cooperation and community-based participation."

Conversely, since the establishment of the Environmental Management Inspectorate (EMI), the initial normative approach, adopted in the industrial context, has turned in a more rationalist direction, "with punishment being the key enforcement strategy for compelling compliance and achieving improved environmental performance."

The term "environmental compliance and enforcement" has adopted "its own peculiar flavour" in South Africa. Many of the prescribed environmental standards are outdated; accordingly, the traditional mechanisms used to regulate behaviour and ensure compliance therewith, such as environmental permits with associated conditions, "have on occasion proven inappropriate." A recent trend has been to seek to include other non-binding standards in the compliance effort. Compliance and enforcement in the South African context may, therefore, "also describe attempts to ensure adherence to environmental standards contained in non-binding instruments such as environmental policies, guidelines and strategies."

Paterson and Kotze believe that "this approach is not ideal." Until such time, however, as appropriate environmental standards are prescribed throughout South Africa's environmental regime, they concede that it may continue.

"So," they ask, "what would be the appropriate environmental standard on which to base the country's compliance and enforcement effort?" There are numerous international precedents, including

- best available technology (BAT);
- best available technology not entailing excessive cost (BATNEEC); and
- best practicable environmental option (BPEO).

As South Africa begins to consolidate its environmental standards, and to review the measures for ensuring compliance with such standards, "it would appear that BPEO is set to become the desired environmental standard."

===== Constitutional mandate =====
A further factor shaping the distinct nature of South Africa's environmental compliance and enforcement effort is the Constitution, particularly the principle of environmental right. Section 24(b) states that everyone has the right to have the environment protected, for the benefit of present and future generations, "through reasonable legislative and other measures." These "other measures," in the view of Paterson and Kotze, "no doubt include those aimed at ensuring environmental compliance and enforcement."

The High Court has recently confirmed, in Khabisi v Aquarella Investment, that the State and its organs, and their representatives, have an "onerous constitutional mandate to promote conservation and protection of the environment."

The constitutional duty to ensure environmental compliance and enforcement is amplified in a suite of environmental legislation promulgated since 1996. Cumulatively, this legislation prescribes concrete statutory mechanisms for both encouraging and compelling compliance with, and facilitating the enforcement of, South Africa's contemporary environmental regime.

More specifically, South Africa's framework environmental law, NEMA, provides for the designation of Environmental Management Inspectors (EMIs), whose specific mandate it is to monitor and enforce compliance with South Africa's environmental regime, and to investigate potential offences and breaches of it.

===== International obligations =====
In fulfilling its constitutional mandate, the South African government is also required to comply with its international compliance and enforcement obligations. Agenda 21, one of the primary international environmental instruments, expressly recognises that building strong institutions, and prescribing dedicated compliance and enforcement programmes, are important prerequisites for achieving the goal of sustainable development. This tenor was reinforced at the World Summit on Sustainable Development, held in Johannesburg in 2002.

In addition, a number of specific international environmental instruments, to which South Africa is a party, require the government to strengthen domestic compliance and enforcement capacity, in order to execute effectively the obligations set out therein.

== Key cases ==
- Bareki NO and Another v Gencor Ltd and Others 2006 (8) BCLR 920 (T).
- Bato Star Fishing (Pty) Ltd v Minister of Environmental Affairs and Others 2004 (4) SA 490 (CC).
- Breytenbach Appellant v Frankel & Another Respondents 1913 AD 390.
- The Director: Mineral Development, Gauteng Region v Save the Vaal Environment 1999 (2) SA 709 (SCA).
- Harmony Gold Mining Co Ltd v Regional Director: Free State, Dept of Water Affairs & Forestry & another [2006] JOL 17506 (SCA).
- Hichange Investments (Pty) Ltd v Cape Produce Company (Pty) Ltd t/a Pelts Products and others [2004] 1 All SA 636 (E).
- Khabisi NO and Another v Aquarella Investment 83 (Pty) Ltd and Others (9114/2007) [2007] ZAGPHC 116 (22 June 2007).
- Maccsand (Pty) Ltd v City of Cape Town and Others (Chamber of Mines of South Africa and Another as Amici Curiae) 2012 (7) BCLR 690 (CC); 2012 (4) SA 181 (CC).
- MEC: Department of Agriculture, Conservation and Environment and another v HTF Developers (Pty) Limited 2008 (4) BCLR 417 (CC).
- Minister of Environmental Affairs and Tourism and Others v Phambili Fisheries (Pty) Ltd; Minister of Environmental Affairs and Tourism and Others v Bato Star Fishing (Pty) Ltd 2003 (6) SA 407 (SCA).
- Minister of Health and Welfare v Woodcarb (Pty) Ltd and Another 1996 (3) SA 155 (N).
- Minister of Public Works v Kyalami Ridge Environmental Association & Others 2001 (7) BCLR 652 (CC).
- Minister of Water Affairs and Forestry v Stilfontein Gold Mining Co Ltd and Others 2006 (5) SA 333 (W).
- Verstappen v Port Edward Town Board and Others 1994 (3) SA 569 (D).

== See also ==
- Administrative law in South Africa
- Constitution of South Africa
- Environmental law
- International law
- Insurance law
- Natural Justice: Lawyers for Communities and the Environment
- South African criminal law
- South African law of delict
- South African property law
