= Dominican Sisters of Grand Rapids =

The Dominican Congregation of Our Lady of the Sacred Heart, better known as the Dominican Sisters of Grand Rapids, is a religious congregation of sisters of the Dominican Third Order established in 1877, with their motherhouse located in Grand Rapids, Michigan. They were founded to provide education to the children of the Catholic populations of Michigan and other regions of the American Midwest. As of 2017, they had 209 sisters in the congregation.

== History ==
The nuns of the Dominican Second Order, had been founded by St. Dominic de Guzman in 1206 as an enclosed religious order. At the start of the 19th century, the German monasteries of the Order which had survived the Protestant Reformation were ordered by Prince-Bishop Karl Theodore von Dahlberg to provide free public education. With this expertise already established in their way of life, in 1853 four choir nuns, accompanied by two lay Sisters, volunteered to go to America from their Monastery of the Holy Cross (founded in 1233) in Regensburg, Bavaria, in order to minister to the needs of the German immigrants then pouring into that nation. Settling in Brooklyn, New York, the nuns accepted girls as students whom they taught within their cloister. They flourished and established small monastic communities around the region where they taught in the parishes of the Diocese of Brooklyn and the Archdiocese of New York.

In 1877, the nuns responded to an invitation by Caspar Henry Borgess, the Bishop of Detroit, to provide education to the children of his diocese. Six nuns of the community left for Michigan, where they settled in Traverse City in October of that year. The success of the community in New York was repeated in Michigan, and small groups of nuns were quickly established throughout the state, where they taught children in tiny monasteries, their living quarters often doubling as classrooms. By 1885 the numbers of Dominican nuns in Michigan had grown to such an extent that they were organized into St. Joseph Province, with Holy Angels Convent in Traverse City serving as the Provincial Motherhouse. This community served the Native American population of the region.

The nuns became independent of New York in 1894 and were established as the Congregation of Our Lady of the Sacred Heart. The General Motherhouse of the new congregation was located in Grand Rapids. Two years later, the nuns were reorganized by the Holy See as a congregation of Religious Sisters of the Third Order of St. Dominic, no longer being restricted to a monastic enclosure.

== Schools ==
In 1881, four nuns, led by Mother Aquinata Fiegler, O.S.D., took over a school of 150 children at St. Boniface Church in Bay City. They soon opened another school in the town at St. Joseph Church, the first Catholic church in the Saginaw Valley, dating from 1852. They also opened Holy Rosary Academy, a boarding school for girls in Essexville.

To meet the norms set by the Third Plenary Council of Baltimore regarding teachers in Catholic schools, the nuns established a normal school in Grand Rapids in 1886 to meet the needs of their candidates to the Order (which would later develop into Aquinas College). Henry Richter, Bishop of the newly erected Diocese of Grand Rapids entrusted the administration of St. John's Home, which he was establishing for orphans, to the nuns in 1888. They also established a community to teach at St. Mary School in Lake Leelanau, Michigan. Some thirty other locations soon followed in the Tri-Cities region of the Michigan peninsula.

The Sisters opened Sacred Heart Academy in Grand Rapids, for which a new facility was built in 1921. This name was changed in 1925 to Marywood Academy. The school closed about 1975, and the campus was transformed to the Dominican Center at Marywood. The Center serves a number of functions of the congregation, including as the General Motherhouse and retirement facilities. It also includes a retreat center.

== Current status ==
During the 20th century, the service of the Dominican Sisters of Grand Rapids expanded to California, New Mexico and Texas; foreign missions were opened in Canada, Honduras and Peru.

During the 1980s, the Sisters saw the effects of drugs on the students in their schools. A number of them were drawn to an analysis of the underlying causes of the violence taking place in the communities surrounding them. In 1990, the congregation established a policy which allowed individual Sisters to consider non-violent civil resistance, with the understanding that they were acting as private individuals and without any financial support by the congregation. This led several to pursue this path as a way to call attention to the role of nuclear weapons. Among them, Sisters Carol Gilbert, Jackie Hudson and Ardeth Platte embarked on a series of protests at military bases where atomic weapons were kept, sometimes repeatedly. This led to lengthy prison stays for some of them.

The Sisters now include opportunities for lay people to be involved in their work, either as an Associate or as a volunteer.
