= Shirley Weis =

American business executive, consultant and author

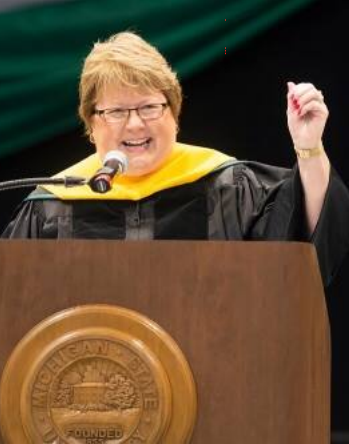
- Education: Michigan State University; Aquinas College
- Occupations: Business executive, consultant, author

Shirley Weis is an American business executive, consultant and author. She was the first woman chief administrative officer in the 150-year history of Mayo Clinic.

== Education and early career ==
Weis was born and raised in Howell, Michigan. She completed her BSN in Nursing from Michigan State University in 1975. She started her career as a nurse working in and managing emergency rooms in hospitals in Michigan. While working as a nurse, she earned a master's degree in Management degree from Aquinas College. She received her degree in 1984 and the next year she joined Blue Cross Blue Shield's Blue Care Network where she later became the Chief Operating Officer.

== Career ==
In 1995, she joined Mayo Clinic's administrative group as the executive director of Mayo's managed care health plan division. Four years later, she became the chair of the Managed Care Department and later the vice chair of administration for Mayo in Arizona. In 2007, she was selected as Mayo's chief administrative officer, becoming the first woman to serve as the organization's CAO.

As the CAO of Mayo, Weis is credited with changing the structure and the business model of the organization as well as introducing an enterprise-wide system for administrative and project management services. During the 2008 recession she led major efforts to decrease costs without layoffs. At Mayo, she oversaw multiple ventures including establishment of the Mayo Clinic Care Network and the Mall of America project. Simultaneously she was a member of the Mayo Clinic Board of Trustees and served as secretary for the Mayo Clinic Board of Governors.

Weis retired from the post of CAO at Mayo in November 2013. In January 2014, she founded Weis Associates, a management and leadership development consulting firm. In August, she was selected as special advisor to the president of Arizona State University. She was also appointed as Professor of Practice in the W.P. Carey School of Business and in the College of Nursing and Health Innovation. In 2014, she received an honorary doctorate of science from Michigan State University.

In 2015, she published Playing to Win in Business, the first book in her Just Respect for Women series. In the book, she shares the lessons she has learned being a business leader. In 2016, it was published in Mandarin Chinese. She regularly speaks at industry conferences and hosts national webinars on health care economics and marketing.

Weis is a member of the Women's Business Leaders Advisory Board in Washington, D.C.; Traverse Global Healthcare Advisory Board; and the MSU College of Nursing Board of Visitors. She is also a board member of Mednax and a previous board member of The Medical Memory, Sentry Insurance and RTI Surgical. She is currently chair of the board for Holy Family Academy in Phoenix, AZ. Weis is emerita professor in the Mayo College of Medicine and has taught health care leadership at Arizona State University, the University of Minnesota's Carlson School of Management, Michigan State University and Winona State University.

She was inducted by the National Association of Professional Women (NAPW) as a 2015-2016 member of its VIP Woman of the Year Circle.

== Awards and honors ==
- 2007 - Top 25 Women in Healthcare by Modern Healthcare
- 2011 - National Association of Professional Women “Woman of the Year”
- 2013 - Top 25 Women in Healthcare by Modern Healthcare
- 2015 - IPPY Gold Award for Business for Playing to Win in Business
