= Mary Jane Dockeray =

American educator (1927–2020)

- Born: March 8, 1927; Kent County, Michigan
- Died: August 18, 2020 (aged 93); Kent County, Michigan
- Occupations: Environmental educator, museum curator

Mary Jane Patricia Dockeray (March 8, 1927 – August 18, 2020) was an American environmental educator, founder of the Blandford Nature Center and Environmental Education Center in Grand Rapids, Michigan. In 2012, she was admitted to the Michigan Women's Hall of Fame.

== Early life ==
Dockeray grew up on a poultry farm in Walker Township. Her father, Winfield Dockeray, was a bookkeeper who also raised chickens. The family owned 2.5 acres just outside of Grand Rapids, an area where neighbors raised goats and open space was plentiful.

Dockeray attended Oakleigh School, a 7th Day Adventist Academy. Her 5th grade teacher, Anna Nelson, discovered that she had an interest in geology and the world around her. Nelson, who was typically quite austere, realized the interest in the young girl and helped Dockeray grow her love of geology.

== Career ==
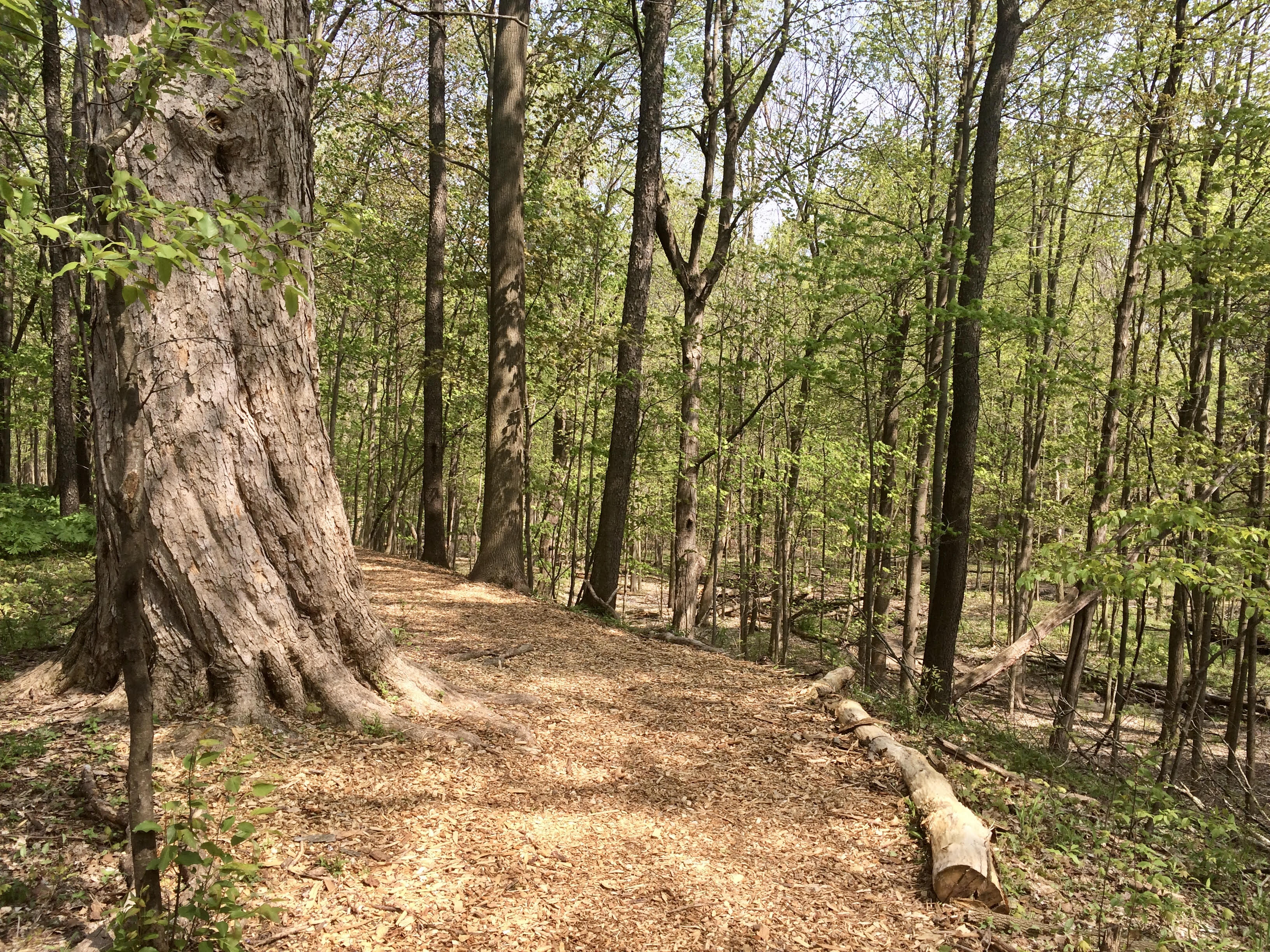
A public trail at the Blandford Nature Center in Grand Rapids, Michigan, during the early springtime, photographed in 2016

Dockeray was a curator of natural history at the Grand Rapids Public Museum in the 1950s and 1960s. She taught summer programs and visited schools to give science presentations. She began developing the Blandford Nature Center with an initial land donation in the 1960s, and the visitor center opened in 1968. She worked at the center until her retirement in 1990, but continued to volunteer at the center after that milestone. She taught at Michigan State University and at Aquinas College, hosted a radio program, Nature Spy, wrote a book, Let’s Go Exploring: Suggestions for Field Trips and Associated Studies in Environmental-Conservation Education, and narrated an educational film, These Things Are Ours (1963). Into her eighties, she was still giving geological tours of Grand Rapids.

Dockeray served on the executive board of the Michigan Audubon Society, and was recognized by the society with an Outstanding Member Award in 1985. She was inducted into the Michigan Women's Hall of Fame in 2012. The Blandford Nature Center's Mary Jane Dockeray Visitor Center opened in 2017. "If people can become better informed about the natural world around, they’ll take better care and their lives will be richer," she explained of her work.

In addition, Dockeray created and made the movie "These Things Are Ours," which was shown as part of National Audubon Society lecture tours across the US and Canada. Dockeray's school visits and lectures with her vintage slide projector were also memorable.

== Personal life ==
Dockeray self-published a memoir, Rock On, Lady: Memoirs of Dr. Mary Jane Dockeray, Geologist Naturalist, in 2014. At a young age Dockeray made the decision to put her career before marriage, and she dedicated her life to her work. Later on in her life she became engaged to her longtime partner, fellow Blandford volunteer Bertrand L. Hewett, until his death on June 18, 2008. She died 12 years later on August 18, 2020.

== Legacy ==
Dockeray's legacy is the Blandford Nature Center she founded in 1968 and the Blandford Environmental Education Program. The center, located in Grand Rapids, Michigan, began as Collins Woods which was a part of a family farm where Dockeray grew up and developed her love of the outdoors. Blandford Center preserves over 143 acres of land. Their mission as stated on their website is to engage, empower, and educate their community through enriching experiences in nature. The center hosts nature trails, an interpretive center, farm demonstrations, several historic buildings, and a wildlife care program. The Blandford Environmental Education Program allows children to experience a full year in nature, it connects every academic subject to nature.

Grand Valley State University offers a Scholarship (Mary Jane Dockeray Scholarship) honoring her legacy. The scholarship is awarded to students pursuing education in science.

== Publications and projects ==
1. Book: Let's Go Exploring: Suggestions for Field Trip and Associated Studies in Environmental-Conservation Education
2. Film: These Things Are Ours
3. Memoir: Rock on, Lady: Memoirs of Dr. Mary Jane Dockeray, Geologist Naturalist
4. Radio Program: Nature Spy

== Awards ==
1. Michigan Audubon Society Outstanding Member Award
2. Michigan Women's Hall of Fame
3. Inaugural Association of Nature Center Administrators’ President's Award for exemplary leadership in the Nature and Environmental Learning Center Profession
