= Kenneth Marin =

American economist

Kenneth Marin (14 October 1922 – 1 September 2007) was an American professor of economics who worked under President Lyndon B. Johnson. President Johnson appointed Marin as a member of the White House Consumer Advisory Council where he served on Wage and Price Control during the mid-sixties.^{1}

He was a graduate of Aquinas College and the University of Michigan, Ann Arbor.

In 1966, Professor Marin was a member of a U.S. State Department evaluation team that was assigned to review various performances in the economic and political arena in six South American countries.^{2}

In 1968, Kenneth Marin went to Tanzania where he worked as an economist for the government of Tanzania in Dar es Salaam. He served as an adviser to the government on capital mobilisation and utilisation until the early seventies. After he returned to the United States he went to teach economics at his alma mater, Aquinas College in his hometown of Grand Rapids, Michigan. He started teaching economics at Aquinas College in 1953 and was the chairman of the economics department for many years. He retired in 1989.^{3} One of his students was Godfrey Mwakikagile from Tanzania who became an African studies scholar and author of many non-fiction books on African history, economics, and politics.

Kenneth Marin died on September 1, 2007, in Chelsea, Michigan. He was 85. According to his obituary:

"His education was interrupted when he served in WWII as an Air Force weather observer in Italy, from 1943 to 1945. He returned to Aquinas to complete his degree in Economics in 1947, and continued on to the University of Michigan (U of M) to complete an M.A. in Economics in 1948. He also pursued a doctoral program in Economics at U of M from 1949 to 1952. In 1953, he returned and joined the Aquinas faculty as Asst. Professor of Economics and Public Relations Director where he stayed until his retirement in 1989....

In 1966, he was part of State Department Evaluation Team to review operations in six South American countries. In 1968, on an academic leave of absence and sabbatical, he moved his family to East Africa, where he served as an advisor on capitol mobilization and utilization to the United Republic of Tanzania; and was appointed by President Lyndon B. Johnson to his Consumer Advisory Council."^{4}
