= Dorli Rainey =

American political activist (1926–2022)

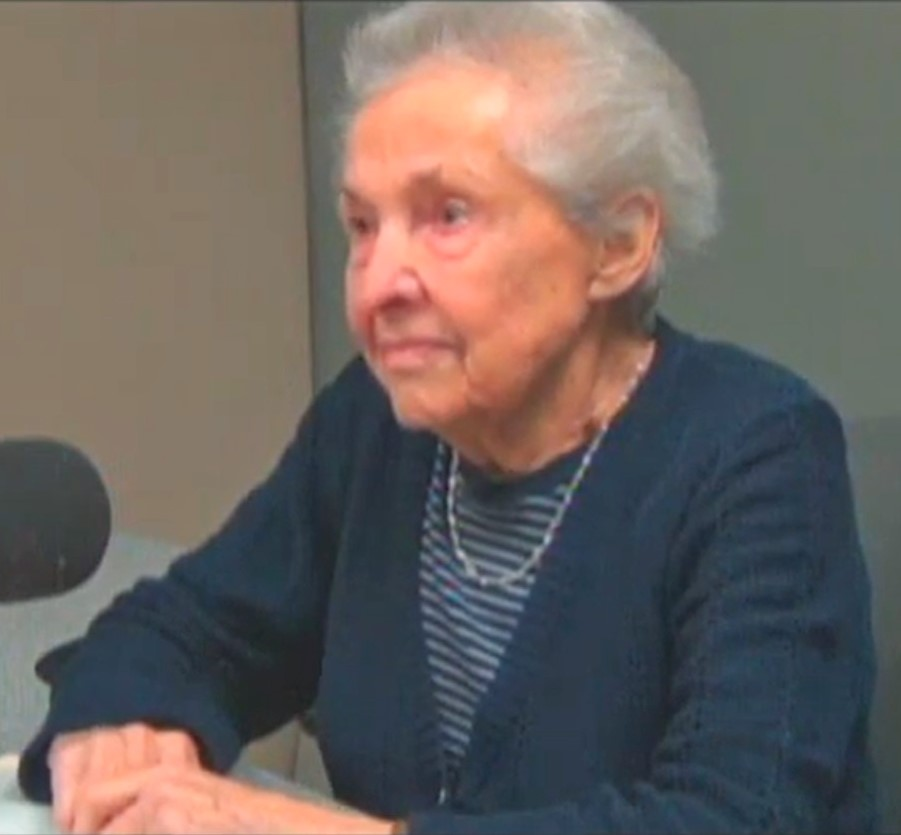
- Rainey interviewed in 2013
- Born: Dorothea Theresia Hantich; December 26, 1926; Graz, Austria
- Died: August 12, 2022 (aged 95); Seattle, Washington, U.S.
- Occupations: Political activist; nurse; real estate agent
- Known for: Progressive activism, being pepper-sprayed at an Occupy Seattle protest by police in 2011
- Spouse: Max Rainey (m. 1955, divorced)
- Children: 2

Dorli Rainey (born Dorothea Theresia Hantich; December 12, 1926 – August 12, 2022) was an Austrian-American political activist. After being pepper-sprayed at an Occupy Seattle protest by police, she became one of the faces of the Occupy Wall Street movement.

Born in Graz, Austria, Rainey spent her childhood involved in learning nursing during World War II before going to medical college and working for the United States military as a translator. Marrying an American engineer, she moved to Seattle, Washington, and became heavily involved in local political and social issues. She won a seat on a school board and ran for political office as a county council member and later as mayor of Seattle, but lost both times. She was a frequent participant in protest movements on various topics, particularly local environmental, housing, and public health issues, though she also attended major protests for women's rights and racial justice.

== Childhood and education ==
Born as Dorothea Theresia Hantich in Graz, Austria on December 12, 1926, to a railroad worker and genealogist father, Teja Hantich, and a Red Cross nurse mother, Dora (Schwarz) Hantich, Rainey spent her childhood working alongside her mother and learned nursing during World War II. Near the end of the war, she moved to Salzburg, Germany to attend medical college and then worked as a translator for the United States military in Austria. She additionally helped to organize the military's motor pool for their activities.

== Career and activism ==
After marrying in 1955, Rainey and her husband moved to Seattle, Washington, after he was hired by Boeing. She wanted to be more involved with the social community, so gave up her practice of nursing and became a real estate agent. She also spent her time volunteering as a Court Appointed Special Advocate for abused children and worked as a sunday school teacher. In the 1970s, she joined a school board in Issaquah, Washington, but found that the other board members were a part of the John Birch Society and she successfully campaigned to have them lose their next elections to the board. In 1975, she ran for the King County Council Seat 6 in the Republican primary against incumbent Tom Forsyth after she received endorsements from the local Young Republicans group, but her campaign lost by 589 votes. Beginning in 2004 and through 2010, she spent every Thursday handing out political leaflets as a member of the Women in Black. In 2009, she ran for mayor of Seattle, but decided to leave the race due to her age.

Her activism work included a wide range of topics, such as ending homelessness, environmental damage from human development on Lake Sammamish, improving public transit availability, activism against large banking conglomerates and nuclear weapons, and women's equality and racial justice.

=== Occupy Seattle incident ===
As a member of Occupy Seattle, Rainey was on her way to a street safety meeting on November 15, 2011, but noticed large amounts of police activity around a known protest location at Fifth and Pine Avenue. Joining the protesters, Rainey was pepper-sprayed by police and other members of Occupy Seattle tried to assist her by pouring milk over her eyes. This action was photographed by news crews and the photo went viral, resulting in her becoming the face of the Occupy movement at the time. The mayor, Mike McGinn, apologized to Rainey after the incident. She gave McGinn a list of concerns about police action in the city and he told her that changes would be made to policy, particularly those involving the use of pepper spray, though the changes made were ignored by police in future incidents.

== Personal life ==
Rainey married an American engineer named Max Rainey in 1955 in Austria. They later divorced after having a son and a daughter together. She died at a hospital in Seattle on August 12, 2022, at the age of 95.

She considered herself "the biggest fan" for the WNBA's Seattle Storm. She ran her own blog titled Old Lady in Combat Boots.
