= Johannesburg City Council v Knoetze and Sons =

South African legal case

In Johannesburg City Council v Knoetze and Sons, an important case in South African law, Trollip J dealt

1. with the question of whether the Supreme Court has jurisdiction to grant an interdict to restrain the performance of conduct which, of itself, constitutes a statutory offence, and
2. with the question of who has locus standi to move the court for an interdict where the court has jurisdiction to grant one.

Trollip J referred firstly to the general principle formulated by Kotze AJA in Madrassa Anjuman Islamia v Johannesburg Municipality, to the following effect:

If it be clear from the language of a statute that the Legislature, in creating an obligation, has confined the party complaining of its non-performance, or suffering from its breach, to a particular remedy, such party is restricted thereto and has no further legal remedy; otherwise the remedy provided by the statute will be cumulative.

After considering the ambit of this general principle and its application to the statute with which he was dealing—it prescribed the payment of certain registration and licence fees for commercial vehicles—Trollip J concluded that the remedies afforded the local authority by the ordinance were such as to negate any suggestion that the local authority could sue civilly to recover unpaid fees.

The judge then proceeded to consider whether the statute also impliedly precluded the local authority from seeking an interdict to prevent the owner of the vehicles in question from using them until the arrear fees had been paid and the vehicles properly registered. The ordinance in question contained a provision making it an offence to operate a vehicle on a public road unless it was duly licensed.

Trollip J quoted a dictum of Solomon JA in Madrassa case:

To exclude the right of a Court to interfere by way of interdict, where special remedies are provided by statute, might in many instances result in depriving an injured person of the only effective remedy that he has, and it would require a strong case to justify the conclusion that such was the intention of the Legislature.

The judge went on to say,

It is true that the qualification—unless the statute otherwise provides—is not incorporated in the well-known rule laid down by Solomon J (as he then was) in Patz v Greene & Co 1907 TS 427 at 433. That decision has, on that account, been criticised in certain decisions [....] But with respect I think that in Patz v Greene & Co the Court was satisfied that the statute in question had not expressly or by necessary implication excluded the civil remedy of interdict (see at 434-5), and it was therefore primarily concerned with the locus standi of the applicant to apply for the interdict (see the argument at 427). Consequently, the rule there laid down accepted, I think, that the right of interdict was available, and it was directed towards defining the person or class of persons who had locus standi to claim its enforcement. Thus, in the Madrassa case, at 726, the same learned Judge who had announced the rule applied it to determine the locus standi of the applicant [....] In my view, therefore, Patz v Greene Ltd does not add to or conflict with the rule quoted above from [...] the Madrassa case. The case will be referred to again later on the question of the present applicant's locus standi.

Now the ordinance does not exclude, expressly or by necessary implication, the remedy of interdict to enforce observance of s 4(1). That remedy, as pointed out above, is applicable to future or continuing breaches; the statutory remedy of prosecution and punishment under s 4(2) relates to past breaches; and the two can therefore co-exist without any conflict. Consequently the reasoning above for excluding the civil remedy for recovering arrear fees and penalties does not apply. Hence, in my view, future or continuing breaches of s 4(1) can be restrained by interdict.

On the question of whether or not the City Council had locus standi to seek an interdict, Trollip J held that, because the ordinance contained the provision prohibiting persons from operating unlicensed or unregistered vehicles on public roads, and because, in terms of other sections of the ordinance, a portion of licence fees paid by persons residing within the area of a local authority accrue to the local authority, the local authority in question had a sufficient "partial interest" to vest it with locus standi. The judge apparently did not consider the mere prohibition against operation of vehicles without compliance with the duty to register them an insufficient basis upon which to find that the local authority could interdict their unlawful operation.
