= Occupy Seattle =

Series of demonstrations in Seattle, U.S.

- Part of the Occupy movement
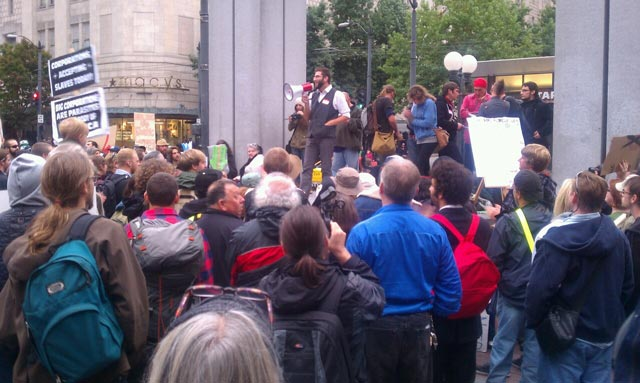
- The General Assembly of Occupy Seattle in October 2011
- Date: September 26, 2011 – 2012
- Location: Seattle, Washington, U.S.
- Caused by: Economic inequality, corporate influence over government, inter alia.
- Methods: Demonstration, occupation, protest, street protesters

Occupy Seattle was a series of demonstrations in Seattle, Washington, United States in 2011 and 2012, that formed part of the wider Occupy movement taking place in numerous U.S. and world cities at that time. The demonstrations were particularly focused on the city's downtown area including Westlake Park and Seattle City Hall; their stated aim was to oppose wealth inequality, perceived corporate greed, and corruption in the banking and economic systems of the United States.

Occupy Seattle was inspired by the Occupy Wall Street protests in New York City in September 2011, which in turn were inspired by the Arab Spring. As late as June 2012, Occupy Seattle continued to engage in organized meetings, events and actions.

== Overview ==
Occupy Seattle began with a demonstration at the Federal Building in downtown Seattle on September 26, 2011. The movement then relocated to Westlake Park on October 1. At first, Westlake was mostly used as a gathering site. Small groups of 20 to 30 people remained overnight, but, the majority of the work still took place during the day. In time, the agenda of the day activities was expanded and organized to fashion a direct democracy led by a General Assembly and supported by work groups.

Concern among some movement members about the feasibility of remaining at Westlake indefinitely lead some members of the movement to take The Mayor up on his offer to camp at City Hall. The Westlake Camp was forced out of the park on the morning of October 17. At this time, the heart of the Occupy Seattle Camp was relocated to City Hall. Several efforts over the following weeks were made to retake the Westlake Location. However, those trying to retake Westlake were met with continuous resistance by the Seattle Police Department.

Although City Hall was a more stable location-complete with power, security guards and reduced police presence, many members of the movement felt that City Hall wasn't a sufficient main camp site. The limited space and terms of the permit, put a tremendous amount of pressure on those camping at City Hall. This came to a boiling point in late October/early November causing many occupiers to depart the site.

Seattle Central Community College (SCCC) was established on October 29, 2011, and the nightly General Assembly moved to SCCC on November 4, 2011. The SCCC Camp was evicted on December 9 and much of the movement has moved indoors, in backyards of supporters, and several mini-occupies remain throughout the city. Some facilities and camping are also located at Seattle City Hall which continue on to this date. General Assemblies have been relocated to Washington Trade and Convention Center at 7pm on Tues, Wed, Fri and Sunday.

According to a news report, the City of Seattle has spent an extra $104,869 as of October 14, 2011, in response to the protest for overtime pay for police and parks & recreation personnel. Police overtime pay comprised the majority of overtime expenses at $97,200.

Ten protesters were arrested for obstructing on the evening of October 13 after refusing to vacate Westlake Park after it had closed. On October 15, the Occupy Seattle movement had its largest demonstration to date, with over 3,000 people rallying in Westlake Park. On the morning of October 17, 2011, Seattle police informed campers at Westlake Park that tents had to be removed for city personnel to clean the park. It was reported that during this incident six demonstrators who didn't comply with the order were arrested.

The city of Seattle issued permits for Occupy Seattle on October 18, 2011, which limits camping at Westlake Park and enforces the park's closure at 10:00 PM. Another permit for protests occurring at Seattle's city hall plaza allows camping with the stipulation that tents are to be deconstructed by 7:00 AM. It was reported that police are enforcing a rule in Westlake Park in which umbrellas are only allowed to be used while being held, and are not allowed to be used as tent-like shelters.

== Key events ==
=== November 2 Chase Bank demonstration ===
On November 2, Occupy Seattle protesters demonstrated at a Chase Bank on 12th Ave; the demonstration was a reaction to Chase CEO Jamie Dimon's visit to Seattle. At 3:00, five protesters entered the bank and linked together via chain and pieces of PVC and facing out from the tellers. In addition about a dozen demonstrators sat in front of the police van to prevent it from moving and were eventually pulled away. After being warned to leave the bank, Seattle Police arrested the demonstrators. During the demonstration, ten police officers were physically assaulted by protesters, one officer was struck with an empty beer bottle, two suffered minor injuries. Pepper spray was used to provide cover for the officers under attack and disperse the assailants.

=== November 15 march ===
External media

Images
- "84-Year-Old Occupy Seattle Protester Pepper Sprayed In The Face"

Video
- "Pepper sprayed in the face by the police at #OccupySeattle"

On November 15, a march commenced from the Seattle Central Community College campus to Belltown. At one point during the march, a 17-year-old female swung a stick at an officer. After officers moved in to arrest the female, the officers were hindered in their efforts; after issuing an order to disperse the officers deployed pepper spray to move subjects away from them so they could arrest the female suspect. Police were filmed spraying the crowd of people with pepper spray. It was reported that the victims included "a 4-foot 10-inch, 84-year-old woman, a priest and a woman, Jennifer Fox, who claimed the pepper spray led to a miscarriage." However, doubts have been cast on the truth of Fox's claim of pregnancy. The 84-year-old woman mentioned was Dorli Rainey a former mayoral candidate who has been active in city government on education and transportation issues since the 1960s. That night, Rainey was en route to City Hall to attend a scheduled meeting of the Seattle City Council's Transportation Committee. Dorli Rainey was photographed as she was being carried away by friends after having been hit with the police's chemical spray.

=== December 12 Port of Seattle demonstration ===
The demonstration's goal was advertised to "disrupt Wall Street on the waterfront" and in solidarity with truck drivers' and longshoremen's unions. The Occupy Seattle movement was not well received by maritime unions. Robert McEllrath, President of the International Longshore and Warehouse Union, said "Support is one thing, organization from outside groups attempting to co-opt our struggle in order to advance a broader agenda is quite another and one that is destructive to our democratic process." However, port truckers across the nation indicated their solidarity with the day of port shut-downs, signaling their own poor working conditions. On December 10, at 1:30 an estimated 400 Occupy Seattle demonstrators left Westlake Park along 2nd Ave as part of a larger effort to shut down West Coast ports. After reaching Terminal 18, protesters divided themselves into different zones; red, yellow, and green differentiating the likelihood of arrest. The demonstrators blocked traffic to Spokane Street in both directions. The protesters then took multiple sections of fencing and dragged it across the roadway leading to the terminal gate. There allegedly were numerous dispersal orders were given to the marchers, however police alleged demonstrators pulled more fencing into the roadway and began throwing burning flares, bags of bricks, and bags of paint, rebar and other debris at the police officers and police horses monitoring the demonstration. Eleven adults were arrested for various violations including Failure to Disperse, Obstructing and Assaulting an Officer. Nine were released on own recognizance while two were held overnight for felony assault on an officer.

== See also ==
Occupy articles

- List of global Occupy protest locations
- Occupy movement
- Timeline of Occupy Wall Street
- We are the 99%

Other Protests

- 15 October 2011 global protests
- 2011 United States public employee protests
- 2011 Wisconsin protests
- Capitol Hill Autonomous Zone

Related articles

- Arab Spring
- Corruption Perceptions Index
- Economic inequality
- Grassroots movement
- Income inequality in the United States
- Lobbying
- Plutocracy
- Tea Party protests
- Wealth inequality in the United States

Related portals:
