= Pearl Flutes =

Musical instrument company

- Company type: Musical Instrument Manufacturer
- Founded: April 1968
- Headquarters: Chiba, Japan
- Products: Flute, Alto flute, Piccolo
- Website: www.pearlflute.com/

Pearl Flutes (established Chiba, Japan, 1968) is part of the Pearl Musical Instrument Company which was founded in 1946. The flutes are distributed worldwide by Pearl Musical Instrument Company, in the United States by Pearl Corporation based in Nashville, Tennessee, and in Europe by Pearl Music Europe based in Venlo, The Netherlands.

Pearl Flutes manufacture all of their instruments with French Pointed Keywork, and a Pinless Mechanism system based on the use of socket headed screws. This is different from other flute makers, most of whom would choose to use small pins to hold together critical parts of the flute's mechanism - which have been known to snag on clothing and let moisture into the delicate internal workings of the flute.

The slogan of Pearl Flutes is "A Tradition of Innovation".
