= Motion in limine =

Motion to request that certain testimony be excluded

In U.S. law, a motion in limine (Latin: [ɪn ˈliːmɪnɛ], "at the start"; literally, "on the threshold") is a motion, discussed outside the presence of the jury, to request that certain testimony be excluded. A motion in limine can also be used to get a ruling to allow for the inclusion of evidence. The motion is decided by a judge in both civil and criminal proceedings. It is frequently used at pre-trial hearings or during trial, and it can be used at both the state and federal levels.

Black's Law Dictionary (8th ed. 2004) defines "motion in limine" as "a pretrial request that certain inadmissible evidence not be referred to or offered at trial." They are made "preliminary", and are presented for consideration of the judge, arbitrator or hearing officer, to be decided without the merits being reached first.

The reasons for the motions are wide and varied, but probably the most frequent use of the motion in limine in a criminal trial is to shield the jury from information concerning the defendant that could possibly be unfairly prejudicial to the defendant if heard at trial. Other reasons arise under the Federal Rules of Civil Procedure for failure to comply with discovery.

Other proper subjects for motions in limine stem from the court's power to "Provide for the orderly conduct of proceedings before it" and to "[c]ontrol its process and orders so as to make them conform to law and justice". These procedural motions in limine may include motions to control the conduct of the prosecutor, motions for separate trials on counts, prior convictions, and/or enhancements, motions to control the courtroom environment, motions to control jury conduct, and other such motions.

A motion in limine is distinct from a motion for a protective order, which is a request to prevent the discovery of evidence, and a motion to suppress, which can be raised by the defense in American criminal trials to prevent the admission of evidence that was obtained unconstitutionally.

== Governing laws ==
Most motions in limine in federal courts are governed by the Federal Rules of Evidence. Some others arise under the Federal Rules of Civil Procedure for failure to comply with discovery.

== Example ==
Examples of motions in limine would be that the attorney for the defendant may ask the judge to refuse to admit into evidence any personal information, or medical, criminal or financial records, using the legal grounds that these records are irrelevant, immaterial, unreliable, or unduly prejudicial, and/or that their probative value is outweighed by the prejudicial result to the defendant, or that the admittance of such information or evidence would otherwise violate one of the court's rules of evidence. A party proffering certain evidence can also ask for the admission of certain information or evidence via a motion in limine.

If the motion in limine to exclude evidence is granted, then the excluded records are prohibited from being presented without specific approval from the judge at the time the party wants to offer the evidence. A reference to such "highly prejudicial" evidence contrary to the tribunal's order is a ground for a mistrial.

== See also ==
- Daubert standard
