= Frank Cepollina =

American engineer and inventor

Frank J. Cepollina
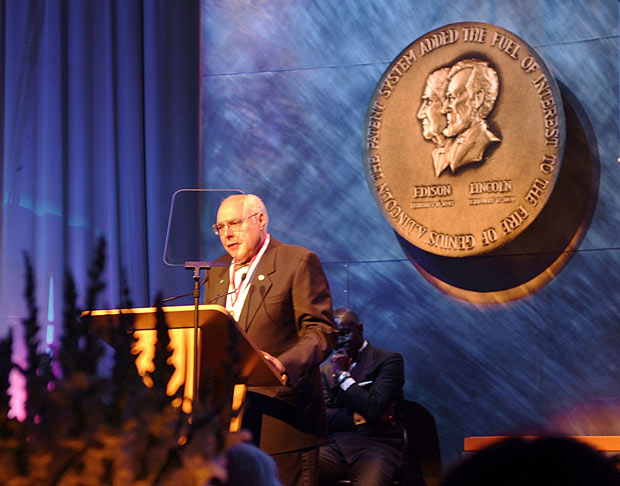
- Frank Cepollina at National Inventors Hall of Fame Induction Ceremony
- Born: December 6, 1936 (age 89); Castro Valley, California
- Education: University of Santa Clara
- Known for: In-orbit satellite servicing techniques
- Scientific career
- Fields: Aerospace
- Workplaces: NASA

Frank J. "Cepi" Cepollina (born December 6, 1936) is an American engineer and inventor who worked for NASA. He is associated with the Hubble Space Telescope. He is referred to as "the Godfather of Satellite Servicing". He was officially inducted to the National Inventors Hall of Fame in May 2003.

== Early life ==
Cepollina was born December 6, 1936, in Castro Valley, California. He grew up on a farm in Alameda, California. While growing up, he learned how to solve mechanical problems working on his grandfather's tractors.

He attended the University of Santa Clara, graduating with a B.S. in mechanical engineering in 1959. After college, he had a commission in the United States Army, working for the Army Security Agency in Warrenton, Virginia.

== Career ==
After college, Cepollina worked for Aerojet General Corp. for four years, followed by the Defense Intelligence Agency. In 1963, he accepted a position with NASA's Goddard Space Flight Center.

With NASA, he worked on the Advanced Orbiting Solar Observatory, which was canceled in 1965 before being launched. Next, he worked on the Orbiting Astronomical Observatory program. In the 1970s, he began working with the Hubble Space Telescope. Cepollina also worked on the Multimission Modular Spacecraft program which built six science satellites in the 1970s and 1980s. This included the Solar Maximum Mission, Landsats 4, Landsats 5, the Upper Atmosphere Research Satellite, and the Extreme Ultraviolet Explorer.

The first modular craft to fly was the Solar Maximum Mission satellite, launched in 1980 to conduct astronomical sun observations. When it began to fail several months into orbit, Cepollina led the repair mission, which began in 1984. The mission was successful, and the modular craft concept proved effective. Cepollina was subsequently named Satellite Servicing Project Manager.

Cepollina was tasked with repairing the Hubble Space Telescope. Having worked on the development of its modular design, as well as its command and control subsystem, Cepollina knew the Hubble's systems well, and the issue was later identified as 375 miles above Earth- a flawed mirror. NASA discovered that this had been caused by a miscalculation which made the telescope incapable of focusing sharply.

Cepollina led other repair and improvement missions for Hubble in 1997, 1999, 2002, and 2009. These added newer technologies such as improved cameras, solar arrays, and improved processors. He became the Deputy Associate Director for the Hubble Space Telescope Development Project. In 2000, he received the rank of Meritorious Executive in Senior Executive Service for his outstanding accomplishments in managing NASA programs. He retired from NASA on January 3, 2017.

His work has led to developments in other industries, including a method of detecting breast cancer, as well as more powerful microchips that used Hubble-type optics and manufacturing applications employing an intelligent, programmable, hand-held power tool.

== Awards ==
In May 2003, he was inducted into the National Inventor's Hall of Fame for his pioneering concept of in-orbit satellite servicing in May 2003.

== Personal life ==
Cepollina is married to Ann. They have four children. His hobby is modeling O gauge railroads.
