= Weiss (surname) =

Weiss or Weiß, also written Weis or Weisz, pronounced like "vice", is a German surname, meaning 'white' in German. It comes from Middle High German wîz (white, blonde) and Old High German (h)wīz (white, bright, shining).

Persons with that name include:

== A ==
- Al Weiss, (born 1954), president of worldwide operations for Walt Disney Parks and Resorts
- Andrew Weiss (disambiguation), multiple people
- Anthony S. Weiss (fl. 1998), McCaughey Chair and Professor of Biochemistry and Molecular Biotechnology at the University of Sydney, Australia
- Armin Weiss (1927–2010), German chemist and politician
- Arnold Weiss (1924–2010), German-born refugee from Nazi Germany who emigrated to the United States where he became an intelligence officer
- Avi Weiss (fl. 1968), an American Modern Orthodox rabbi who heads the Hebrew Institute of Riverdale

== B ==
- Bari Weiss (born 1984), American opinion writer and editor
- Barry Weiss (born 1959), American music executive
- Barry Weiss (Storage Wars), American antiques collector
- Bernhard Weiss (1827–1918), German Biblical scholar
- Bianca Weiß (born 1968), German field hockey player
- Bill Weiss (1925–2011), American baseball historian and statistician
- Birte Weiss (1941–2026), Danish journalist and politician
- Bob Weiss (born 1942), American basketball player and coach
- Brian Weiss (born 1944), American psychiatrist and hypnotherapist

== C ==
- Carl Weiss (1906–1935), murderer of Huey Long
- Carl W. Weiss (1915–1942), United States marine during World War II
- Carol Weiss King (1895–1952), attorney, founder of the International Juridical Association
- Catharina Weiss (born 2000), German wheelchair basketball player
- Christian Samuel Weiss (1780–1856), German mineralogist
- Christopher Weiss, a.k.a. Slipknot, a supervillain from DC Comics
- Chuck E. Weiss (1945–2021), American songwriter and vocalist
- Claudia Weiss (born 1975), German politician
- Clemens Weiss (born 1955), German artist

== D ==
- D. B. Weiss (born 1971), American television producer, writer, and novelist
- Daniel Weiss (disambiguation), multiple people
- Daniella Weiss (born 1945), Israeli settler, and founder of Nachala
- David Weiss (disambiguation), multiple people

== E ==
- Edith Weiss-Mann (1885–1951), German musicologist and harpsichordist
- Edmund Weiss (1837–1917), Austrian astronomer
- Edoardo Weiss (1889-1970), Italian psychoanalyst
- Elia Weiss (born 2009), German racing driver
- Elvira Drobinski-Weiß (born 1951), German politician
- Emanuel Weiss (1906–1944), New York organized crime figure, executed for murder
- Emily Weiss (born 1985), American businesswoman and founder
- Enoch R. Weiss (1848–1917), American military soldier
- Eric Weiss, fictional character, introduced in 2001 on the television series Alias
- Ernst August Weiß (1900–1942), German mathematician
- Ernest David Weiss (1902–1982), Naturalised British Soviet espionage agent.
- Ehrich Weiss, real name of Harry Houdini (1874–1926), Hungarian-American illusionist and stunt performer

== F ==
- Florence Weiss, Russian-Born Yiddish theatre actor and soprano
- Franz Weiss (violist) (1778–1830), Austrian viola player
- Franz Weiß (politician) (1887–1974), German politician
- Frederick Charles Weiss (1885–1968), German-American neo-Nazi activist
- Frederick Ernest Weiss (1865–1953), British botanist
- Frederick G. Weiss (born 1939), American scholar of Hegel
- Friedrich Weiß (1889–1950), known as Friedrich Feher or Friedrich Fehér, Austrian actor and film director
- Fritz Weiss (1919–1944), Czech jazz musician

== G ==
- Gaia Weiss (born 1991), French model and actress
- Gary Weiss (fl. 1984), American investigative journalist
- Georg Fritz Weiß (1822–1893), German operatic bass and actor
- George Weiss (baseball) (1894–1972), American baseball executive
- George Weiss (producer) (fl. 1954–1995), American film producer
- George David Weiss (1921–2010), American songwriter, president Songwriters Guild of America
- George Henry Weiss (1898–1946), American poet, writer and novelist
- Guido Weiss (1928–2021), Italian-born American mathematician

== H ==
- Hans Weiss (aviator) (1892–1918), German flying ace
- Harald Weiss (born 1949), German composer
- Harry Weiss (philatelist) (1888–1966), American philatelist
- Hartmut Weiß (born 1942), German footballer
- Harvey Weiss (fl. 1966), American archaeologist and professor
- Heinz Weiss (1921–2010), German film actor
- Helen Weiss, British epidemiologist
- Helen L. Weiss (1920–1948), American composer, pianist and choir director
- Heraldo Weiss (1917–1952), Argentine tennis player
- Herbert Weiss (born 1954), American author and journalist
- Herm Weiss (1916–1976), American basketball player
- Hermann Weiss (1909–??), Austrian Olympic ice hockey player
- Hilda Weiss (1900–1981), German-American sociologist
- Hymie Weiss (1898–1926), American mobster in the 1920s

== I ==
- Isaac Hirsch Weiss (1815–1905), Austrian talmudist

== J ==
- Jack Weiss (born 1964), American entrepreneur and politician
- Jacob Weiss (1750–1839), American Revolutionary War officer
- Jan Weiss (1892–1972), Czech writer
- Janet Weiss (born 1965), American rock drummer
- Jeff Weiss (1940–2022), American playwright, impresario, and actor
- Jennifer Weiss (politician) (born 1959), American politician
- Jerry Weiss (musician) (born 1946), American musician and member of Blood, Sweat & Tears
- Jim Weiss (born 1948), American children's audio storyteller and author
- Johannes Weiss (1863–1914), German theologian
- John Weiss (1818–1879), American clergyman, author, abolitionist and women's rights advocate
- John Weiss (American football) (1921–1990), American football player
- John-Allison Weiss (born 1987), New York-based indie-pop singer-songwriter
- Johnny Weiss (born 1963), known as Johnny Hotbody, American professional wrestler
- Jonathan M. Weiss (born 1942), American scholar
- Joseph Weiß (1486/87–1565), from German Renaissance family of painters, son of Marx Weiß the Elder, brother of Marx Weiß the Younger
- Joseph G. Weiss (1918–1969), British scholar of Jewish Mysticism and Hasidism, director of the Institute of Jewish Studies at University College London
- Joseph Hirsch Weiss (1800–1881), Hungarian rabbi
- Joseph Joshua Weiss (1905–1972), Austrian chemist and professor, co-discoverer of Haber–Weiss reaction
- Josephine Weiss (1805–1852), Austrian ballet dancer and dance troupe leader
- Juleanna Glover, formerly Glover–Weiss (born 1969), American public affairs consultant, lobbyist, political strategist
- Julie Weiss (fl. 1975), American film and stage costume designer

== K ==
- Kim Weiss (born 1989), American ice hockey coach

== L ==
- Lee Weiss (1928–2018), American painter
- Leopold Weiss, birth name of Muhammad Asad (1900–1992), Austro-Hungarian journalist, political theorist, diplomat and Islamic scholar
- Linda Weiss (fl. 1988), Australian professor of political science
- Louis S. Weiss (1894–1950), American lawyer
- Louis Weiss (producer) (1890-1963), American film producer
- Louise Weiss (1893–1983), French author, journalist, feminist and politician
- Luigi Weiss (born 1951), Italian ski mountaineer and biathlete

== M ==
- Manfred Weiss (1935–2023), German composer and academic teacher
- Maria Weiss (singer) (fl. 2003), Austrian baroque and opera singer
- Maria-Lena Weiss (born 1981), German politician
- Marius Weiß (born 1975), German politician
- Markus Nissa Weiss (fl. 1792), Hungarian advocate and author of Jewish Reform movement
- Marthe Weiss née Klein (1885–1953), French scientist and teacher, worked with Marie Curie, wife of Pierre Weiss
- Martin Weiss (disambiguation), multiple people
- Marx Weiß (c. 1518 – 1580), from German Renaissance family of painters, son of Marx Weiß the Elder, brother of Joseph Weiß
- Mary Weiss (1948–2024), American pop music vocalist, lead singer of The Shangri-Las
- Mary Terán de Weiss (1918–1984), Argentine tennis player
- Motti Weiss, American musician known as Matt Dubb
- Max Weiss (1857–1927), Austrian chess player
- Max Weiss (activist) (fl. 1926–1956), American author and executive in the Communist Party USA
- Melvyn Weiss (1935–2018), American attorney
- Michael Weiss (disambiguation), multiple people
- Mitch Weiss (born 1957), American investigative journalist, Pulitzer Prize winner
- Mitch Weiss (photographer) (born 1986), American photographer
- Mónica Weiss (born 1956), Argentine illustrator, artist, writer and architect
- Morris Weiss (1915–2014), American comic book and comic strip artist and writer
- Myra Tanner Weiss (1917–1997), American Trotskyist communist, three time U.S. Vice-Presidential candidate

== N ==
- Nathan Weiss (1851–1883), Austrian physicist and neurologist
- Nigel Weiss (1936–2020), South African astronomer and mathematician
- Norman Weiss (fl. 1940s–??), American talent agent for The Turtles and Tom Jones, arranged The Beatles first American tour

== P ==
- Paul Weiss (disambiguation), multiple people
- Pernille Weiss (born 1968), Danish politician
- Peter Weiss, (1916–1982), German-Swedish writer and artist
- Pierre Weiss (1865–1940), French physicist, husband of Marthe Weiss

== R ==
- Rachel Weisz (born 1970), British-American actress
- Rainbow George Weiss (1940–2021), British politician
- Rainer Weiss (1932–2025), German-American Nobel Prize laureate in Physics
- Regina Weiss, American politician
- Robert Weiss (disambiguation), multiple people
- Ruth Weiss (disambiguation), multiple people
- Ryan Weiss, American baseball player

== S ==
- Sabine Weiss (disambiguation), multiple people
- Samuel Weiss (disambiguation), multiple people
- Sara Weiss (d. 1904), American spiritualist and author
- Shaun Weiss (born 1978), American actor and recidivist criminal offender
- Shevah Weiss (1935–2023), Israeli politician
- Sholam Weiss (born 1954), American businessman and felon sentenced to 845 years in prison
- Soma Weiss (1898–1942), Hungarian-American physician
- Stephen Weiss (born 1983), Canadian ice hockey player
- Susan Archer Weiss (1822–1917), American poet, author and artist
- Sylvius Leopold Weiss (1687–1750), German composer and lutenist

== T ==
- Thorsten Weiß (born 1983), German politician
- Trude Weiss-Rosmarin (1908–1989), German-American writer, scholar and feminist activist

== V ==
- Vintilă Weiss (c. 1920–1974), Romanian Securitate official and whistleblower
- Vladimír Weiss (footballer, born 1939) (1939–2018), Slovak/Czechoslovak footballer and football coach
- Vladimír Weiss (footballer, born 1964), Slovak/Czechoslovak, footballer and football coach
- Vladimír Weiss (footballer, born 1989), Czechoslovak-born Slovak footballer

== W ==
- Walt Weiss (born 1963), American baseball player and manager
- Walter Weiß (1890–1967), Nazi German general
- Werner Weiß (1926–1990), German politician (CDU)
- Wilhelm Weiss (1892–1950), German senior Nazi Party member and editor of its newspaper
- Wincent Weiss (born 1993), German singer and talent show contestant
- Wojciech Weiss (1875–1950), Polish artist

== Y ==
- Yisroel Dovid Weiss (born 1956), American rabbi
- Yitzchok Yaakov Weiss (1902–1989), Austro-Hungarian-born British rabbi, halachic authority and Talmudic scholar

== Z ==
- Zack Weiss (born 1992), American baseball player
