= Michael Weiss (engineer) =

American engineer

Michael L. Weiss
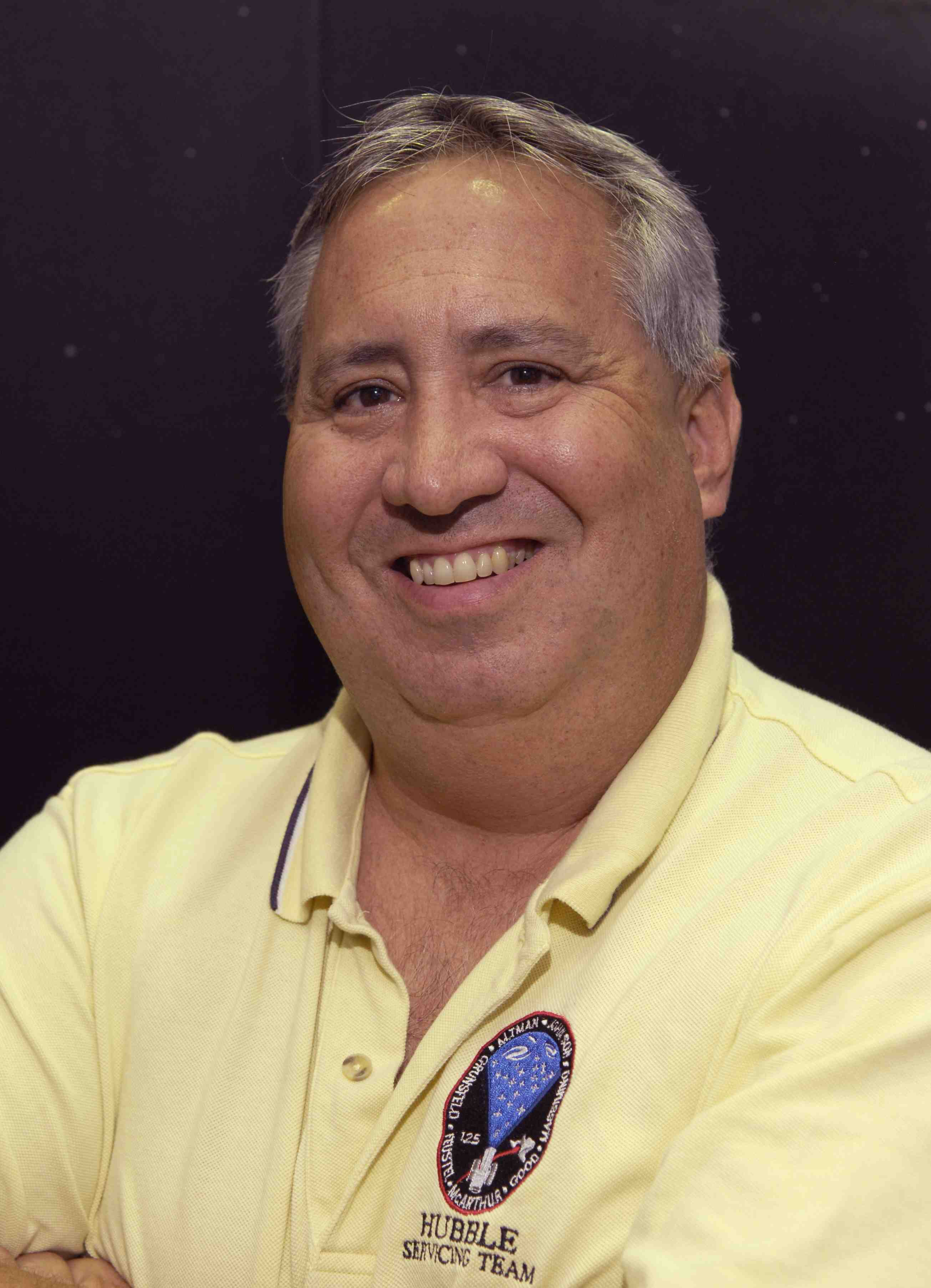
- Citizenship: United States
- Education: University of Maryland
- Known for: Hubble Space Telescope

Michael L. Weiss is an American engineer who is known for his contributions to on-orbit satellite servicing missions, particular of the Hubble Space Telescope. Weiss most recently served as deputy program director on the Hubble Space Telescope program at NASA's Goddard Space Flight Center in Greenbelt, Maryland.

Weiss received his B.S. and M.S. in aerospace engineering from the University of Maryland at College Park in 1978 and 1983. He has led the systems engineering for missions including the Solar Maximum Mission, Upper Atmosphere Research Satellite, the Compton Gamma Ray Observatory and Extreme Ultraviolet Explorer as well as the first shuttle based satellite repair, the Solar Maximum Repair Mission in 1984.

Weiss was involved in all 5 Hubble Space Telescope servicing missions. He directed systems development during servicing mission 1 and servicing mission 2. He served as deputy program director through servicing mission 4. He also led the Mishap Investigation Board investigating the failure of a balloon launch from Australia carrying a gamma-ray telescope for to the University of California at Berkeley.

Weiss is an accomplished diver having accumulated over 200 hours in NASA’s Neutral Buoyancy Laboratory in training Shuttle flight crews on servicing techniques and procedures. Outside NASA, he an open water diver and underwater photographer.

Weiss has appeared on NOVA, the Discovery Channel, NPR, and the BBC discussing Hubble and the servicing missions.
