= Oigon Lake =

Lake in Zavkhan Province, Mongolia

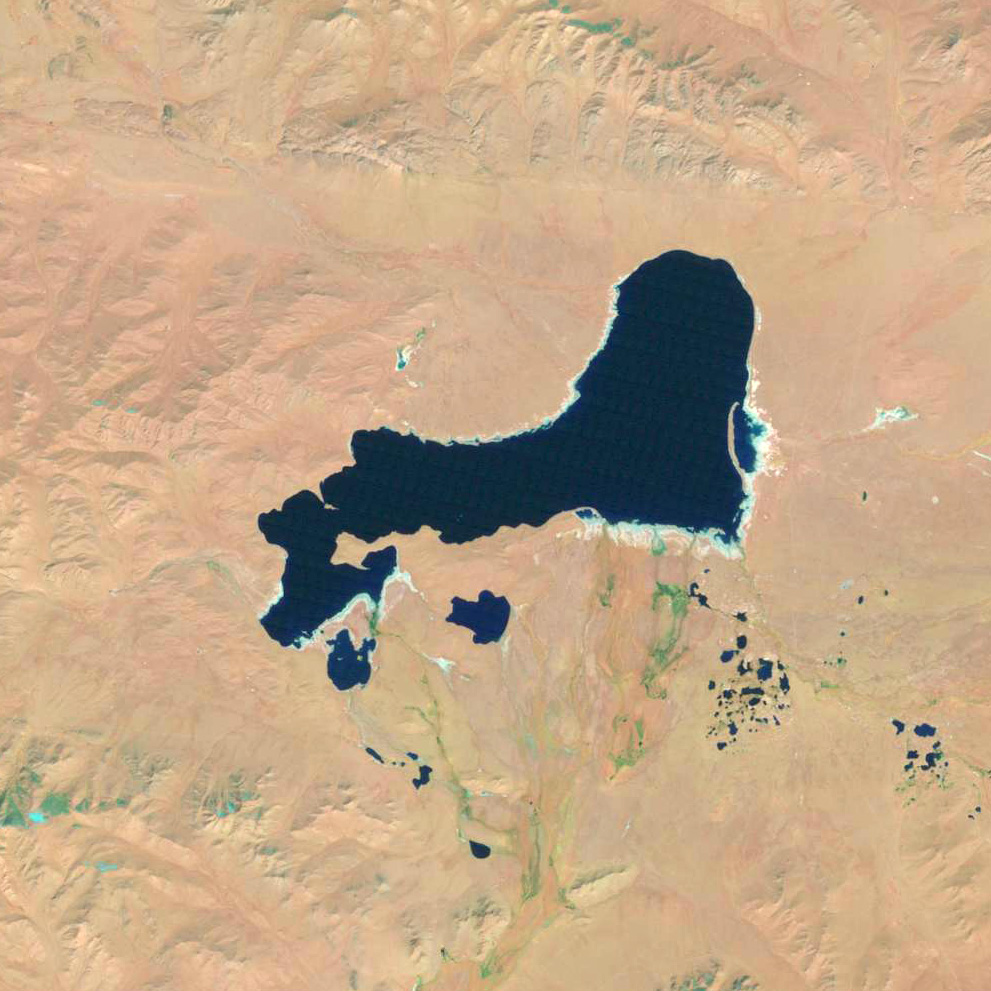
- Oigon Lake satellite image (Landsat 5, 2011-09-21)

- Location within Mongolia
- Location: Zavkhan aimag
- Coordinates: 49°10′N 96°36′E
- Basin countries: Mongolia

Oigon Lake (Mongolian: Ойгон нуур) is a lake in Zavkhan Province, Mongolia.

Mongolian prime minister and reborn lama Jalkhanz Khutagt Sodnomyn Damdinbazar was born there in 1874.
