= Vajs =

Vajs (feminine: Vajsová) is a Slovak surname, a Slovakised form of the German surname Weiss. Notable people with the surname include:

- Miroslav Vajs (born 1979), Macedonian footballer
- Roman Vajs (born 1974), Slovak slalom canoer
