= Weis (surname) =

Weis is a German surname, often occurring as a spelling variant of Weiss, from the German word weiß meaning "white", potentially referring to skin or hair complexion or a location name. The surname may in some cases have also come to be from a medieval German nickname for someone considered wise.

Notable people with this surname include:

- Aaron and Adam Weis, American child actors and school teachers
- Al Weis (born 1938), baseball player
- Alexandrea Weis, American novelist
- André Weis (born 1989), German soccer player
- Anna Weis (born 1998), American sailor
- Bernhard Weis (born 1976), German soccer coach
- Butch Weis (1901–1997), American baseball player
- Carlo Weis (born 1958), Luxembourgish soccer player
- Charlie Weis (born 1956), American football coach
- Charlie Weis Jr. (born 1993), American football coach
- Christian Weis (born 1968), German tennis player
- Danny Weis (born 1948), American guitarist for Iron Butterfly and Rhinoceros
- Dominique Weis, Canadian scientist
- Don Weis (1922–2000), American director
- Ellen Havre Weis (1957–2021), American historian
- Flemming Weis (1898–1981), Danish composer
- Frédéric Weis (born 1977), French basketball player
- Frederick Lewis Weis (1895–1966), American historian
- Gary Weis, American filmmaker
- Heinz Weis (born 1963), German athlete
- Heidelinde Weis (1940–2023), Austrian actress
- Indira Weis (born 1979), German actress and singer
- Jakob Weis (1879–1948), German priest
- Jessica M. Weis (1901–1963), American politician
- Jody Weis (born 1957), American police officer
- John Ellsworth Weis (1892–1962), American painter
- John Harvey Weis (1911–1992), American politician
- Joseph F. Weis Jr. (1923–2014), American judge
- Judith Weis (born 1941), American marine biologist
- Kaleb Weis, American politician
- Karel Weis (1862–1944), Czech composer
- Kira Weis (born 2004), German long-distance runner
- Margaret Weis (born 1948), American writer
- Martin Weis (born 1970), German rower
- Melissa Weis (born 1971), American discus thrower
- Michelle Weis (born 1997), Danish ice hockey player
- Nicolaus von Weis (1796–1869), German bishop
- Paul Weis (1907–1991), Austrian lawyer
- Petra Weis (born 1957), German politician
- Reinhard Weis (born 1949), German politician
- Samuel Washington Weis (1870–1956), American painter
- Shirley Weis, American business executive
- Sosthène Weis (1872–1941), Luxembourgish artist
- Thea Weis (1924–1999), Austrian actor
- Tobias Weis (born 1985), German soccer player
