= Maria Weiss =

Maria Weiss may refer to:

- Mary Terán de Weiss, also known as María Teran Weiss, Argentine tennis player
- Maria Weiss (singer), Austrian mezzo-soprano
- Maria-Lena Weiss, German politician
