= David Weiss =

David Weiss may refer to:

== Music ==
- David Weiss (musician) (born 1964), jazz trumpeter, composer, and arranger
- David Was (born 1952), stage name of David Weiss, American musician and producer

== Science and academia ==
- David Weiss (physicist), American physicist
- David Solomon Weiss (born 1953), Canadian organizational psychologist and business strategist
- David Weiss Halivni (1927–2022), Israeli-American scholar and professor of Jewish studies and the Talmud

== Writers ==
- David Weiss (novelist) (1909–2002), American author
- David N. Weiss, American screenwriter, executive in the Writers Guild of America
- David S. Weiss (fl. 1995), American comedy writer, radio sidekick for Dennis Miller

== Other ==
- David Weiss (1946–2012), of duo Peter Fischli & David Weiss, Swiss multi-media artist
- David C. Weiss (born 1956), United States Attorney for the District of Delaware
- David Weiss (footballer) (born 2007), Finnish footballer
