= Solar Maximum Mission =

NASA solar observatory (1980–1989)

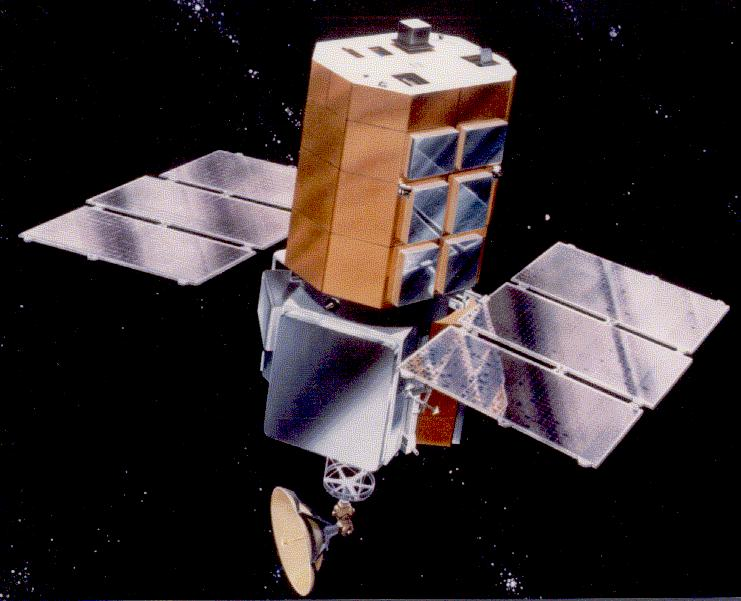
- Names: SolarMax; SMM
- Mission type: Heliophysics
- Operator: NASA
- COSPAR ID: 1980-014A
- SATCAT no.: 11703
- Website: hao.ucar.edu
- Mission duration: 9 years, 9 months, 18 days

Spacecraft properties
- Bus: Multimission Modular Spacecraft
- Manufacturer: Fairchild Industries
- Launch mass: 2,315 kg (5,104 lb)
- Dimensions: 4 × 2.3 m (13.1 × 7.5 ft)

Start of mission
- Launch date: 14 February 1980, 15:57:00 UTC
- Rocket: Delta 3910; D-151
- Launch site: Cape Canaveral LC-17A

End of mission
- Disposal: Deorbited
- Decay date: 2 December 1989

Orbital parameters
- Reference system: Geocentric
- Regime: Low Earth
- Eccentricity: 0.00029
- Perigee altitude: 508.0 km (315.7 mi)
- Apogee altitude: 512.0 km (318.1 mi)
- Inclination: 28.5 degrees
- Period: 94.80 minutes
- Mean motion: 15.19
- Epoch: 14 February 1980, 15:57:00 UTC

The Solar Maximum Mission satellite (or SolarMax) was designed to investigate Solar phenomena, particularly solar flares. It was launched on February 14, 1980. The SMM was the first satellite based on the Multimission Modular Spacecraft bus manufactured by Fairchild Industries, a platform which was later used for Landsat 4 and Landsat 5 as well as the Upper Atmosphere Research Satellite.

After an attitude control failure in November 1980 it was put in standby mode until April 1984 when it was repaired by a Shuttle mission.

The Solar Maximum Mission ended on December 2, 1989, when the spacecraft re-entered the atmosphere and burned up over the Indian Ocean.

== Instruments ==
Experiments on board the Solar Maximum Mission
Name	Target	Principal Investigator
Coronagraph/Polarimeter: 446.5–658.3 nm, 1.5- 6 sq.solar radii fov, 6.4 arcsec res.	Solar corona, prominences, and flares	House, Lewis L., High Altitude Observatory
Ultraviolet Spectrometer and polarimeter 175.0–360.0 nm raster imager, 0.004 nm sp.res.	Solar UV, Earth's atmosphere	Tandberg-Hanssen, Einar A., NASA Marshall Space Flight Center
Soft X-ray Polychromator: raster imager, crystal spectrom. in parts of 0.14–2.25 nm	Solar flares, active solar regions	Acton, Loren W., Lockheed Palo Alto, Culhane, J University College, London, Leonard, Gabriel, Alan-Henri, Rutherford Appleton Laboratory
Hard X-ray Imaging Spectrometer: fov 6.4 arcmin, 8 or 32 arcsec res, 3.5–30 keV	Solar active regions and flares	de Jager, Cornelis, University of Utrecht
Hard X-ray Burst Spectrometer: CsI(Na), 15 energy channels covering 20–260 keV	Solar flares and active regions	Frost, Kenneth J., NASA Goddard Space Flight Center
Gamma-ray Spectrometer: NaI(T1),0.01-100 MeV in 476 channels, 16.4 s per spectrum	solar gamma-rays	Chupp, Edward L, University of New Hampshire
Active Cavity Radiometer Irradiance Monitor: 0.001-1000 micrometer solar flux	solar irradiance	Willson, Richard C, NASA Jet Propulsion Laboratory

== Failure and repair ==
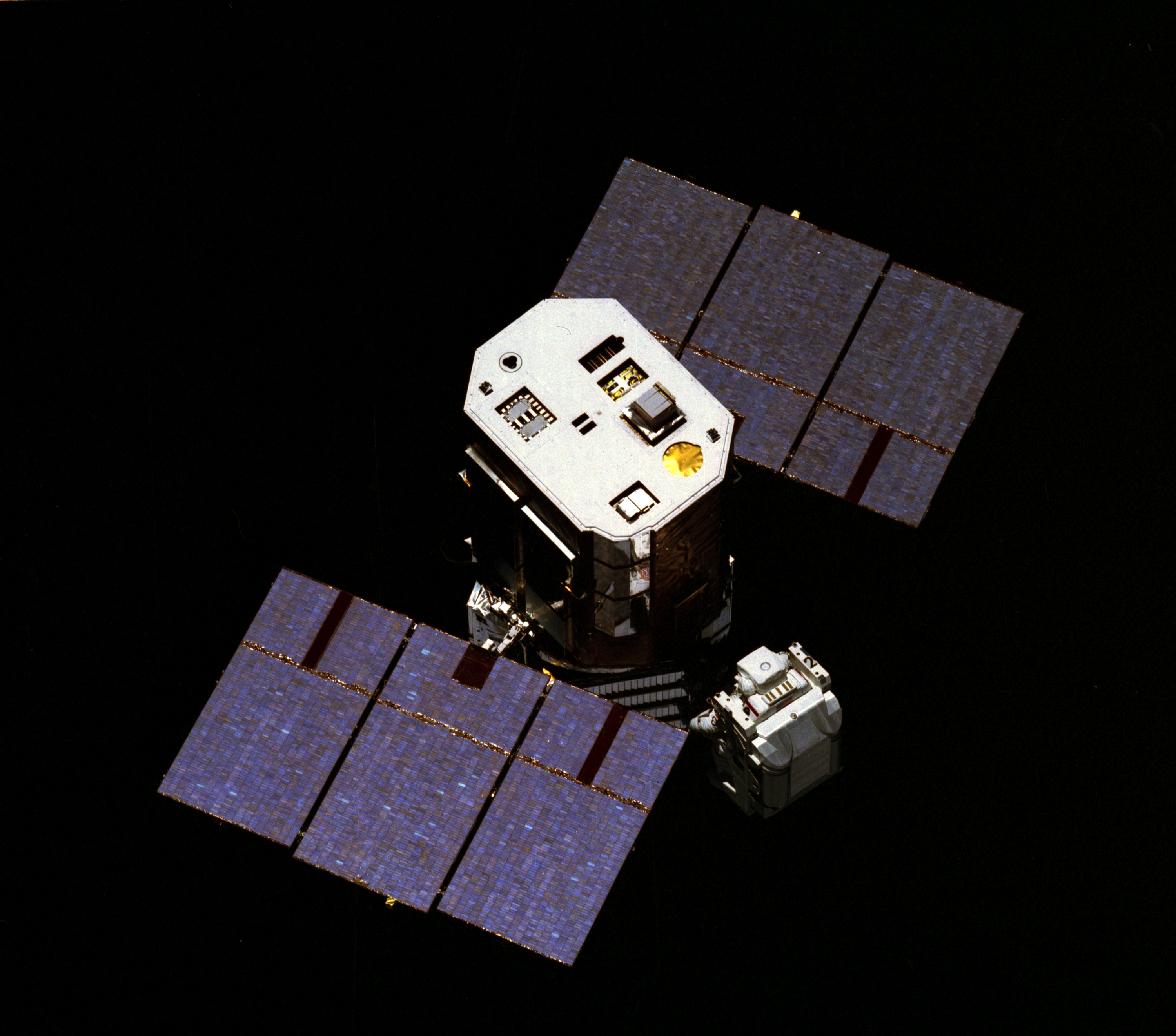
Astronaut George Nelson attempts to capture the Solar Maximum Mission satellite during STS-41-C.

The white-light coronagraph/polarimeter (C/P) took coronal images for about six months from March 1980 before suffering an electronics failure in September that prevented operation.

In November 1980, the second of four fuses in SMM's attitude control system failed, causing it to rely on its magnetorquers in order to maintain attitude. In this mode, only three of the seven instruments on board were usable, as the others required the satellite to be accurately pointed at the Sun. The use of the satellite's magnetorquers prevented the satellite from being used in a stable position and caused it to "wobble" around its nominally sun-pointed attitude. SMM was left in standby mode for 3 years.

The first orbiting, uncrewed satellite to be repaired in space, SMM was notable in that its useful life compared with similar spacecraft was significantly increased by the direct intervention of a crewed space mission. During STS-41-C in April 1984, the Space Shuttle Challenger rendezvoused with the SMM, astronauts James van Hoften and George Nelson attempted to use the Manned Maneuvering Unit to capture the satellite and to bring it into the orbiter's payload bay for repairs and servicing. The plan was to use an astronaut-piloted Maneuvering Unit to grapple the satellite with the Trunnion Pin Attachment Device (TPAD) mounted between the hand controllers of the Maneuvering Unit, null its rotation rates, and allow the Shuttle to bring it into the Shuttle's payload bay for stowage. Three attempts to grapple the satellite using the TPAD failed. The TPAD jaws could not lock onto Solar Max because of an obstructing grommet on the satellite not included in its blueprints.

This led to an improvised plan which nearly ended the satellite's mission. The improvisation had the astronaut use his hands to grab hold of a solar array and null the rotation with a push from the Maneuvering Unit's thrusters. Instead, this attempt induced higher rates and in multiple axes; the satellite was tumbling out of control and quickly losing battery life. SMM Operations Control Center engineers shut down all non-essential satellite subsystems and with a bit of luck were able to recover the satellite minutes before total failure. The ground support engineers then stabilized the satellite and nulled its rotation rates for capture with the Shuttle's robotic arm. This proved to be a much better plan. The satellite had been fitted with one of the arm's grapple fixtures so that the robotic arm was able to capture and maneuver it into the shuttle's payload bay for repairs.

During the mission, the SMM's entire attitude control system module and the electronics module for the coronagraph/polarimeter instrument were replaced, and a gas cover was installed over the X-ray polychromator. Their successful work added five more years to the lifespan of the satellite. The mission was depicted in the 1985 IMAX movie The Dream Is Alive.

== Discovery of comets ==
10 comets were discovered in images from the SMM, all of which are members of the Kreutz sungrazer group. Robert M. MacQueen estimated that the comets seen by SMM had nuclei no greater than 16 m (52 ft) in radius.

Designation	Alternate	Observation date	Discoverer	Ref
C/1987 T2 (SMM-1)	-	1987-Oct-05	O. C. St. Cyr	
C/1987 U4 (SMM-2)	-	1987-Oct-17	O. C. St. Cyr	
C/1988 M1 (SMM-3)	1988l	1988-Jun-27	O. C. St. Cyr	
C/1988 Q1 (SMM-4)	1988m	1988-Aug-21	D. Kobe; C. Waugh	
C/1988 T1 (SMM-5)	1988n	1988-Oct-11	O.C. St. Cyr	
C/1988 U1 (SMM-7)	1988q	1988-Oct-24	A. L. Stanger	
C/1988 W1 (SMM-6)	1988p	1988-Nov-18	O.C. St. Cyr	
C/1989 L1 (SMM-8)	1989m	1989-Jun-02	O.C. St. Cyr; D. L. Kobe	
C/1989 N3 (SMM-9)	1989q	1989-Jul-08	O.C. St. Cyr	
C/1989 S1 (SMM-10)	1989x	1989-Sep-28	O.C. St. Cyr	

== Findings ==
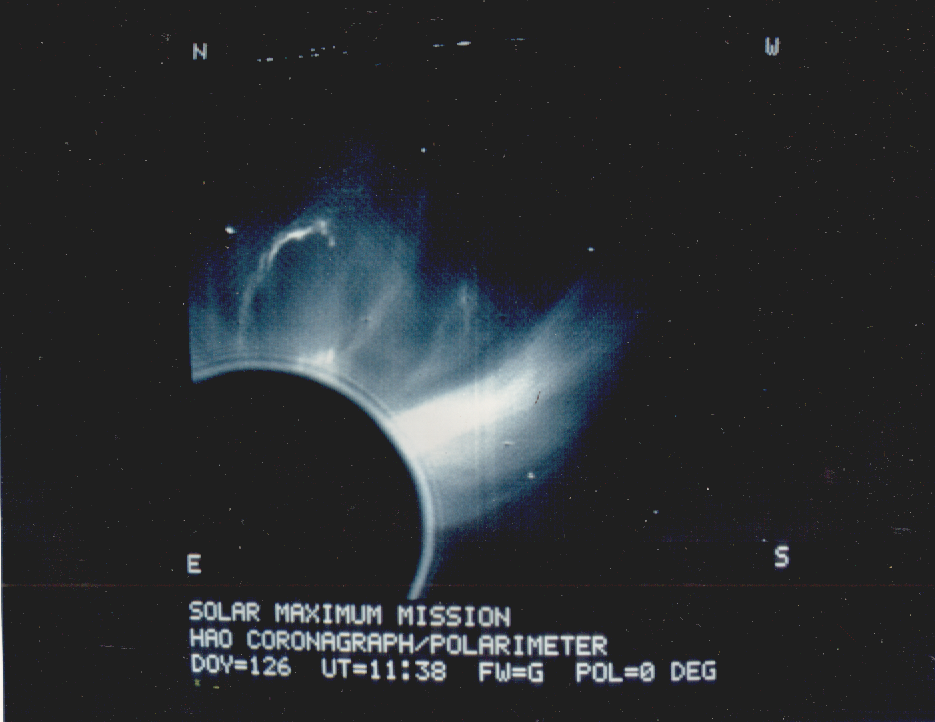
A coronal transient as seen by the SMM on May 5, 1980.

Significantly, the SMM's ACRIM instrument package showed that contrary to expectations, the Sun is actually brighter during the sunspot cycle maximum (when the greatest number of dark 'sunspots' appear). This is because sunspots are surrounded by bright features called faculae, which more than cancel the darkening effect of the sunspot.

The major scientific findings from the SMM are presented in several review articles in a monograph.

== End of mission ==
SMM's orbit slowly decayed due to atmospheric drag taking it down into denser regions. The March 1989 geomagnetic storm was reported to have led to SMM dropping half a kilometre at the start of the storm and 5 kilometres over the whole period. The satellite eventually lost attitude control on November 17, 1989, and re-entry and burn-up occurred on December 2, 1989, over the Indian Ocean.

== See also ==
- List of heliophysics missions
  - Advanced Composition Explorer
  - Parker Solar Probe
  - Solar and Heliospheric Observatory
  - Solar Dynamics Observatory
  - Solar Orbiter
  - WIND (spacecraft)
- Charles Hyder
