= Robert Wise (disambiguation) =

Robert Wise (1914–2005) was an American film producer and director.

Robert Wise may also refer to:

- Bob Wise (born 1948), American governor of West Virginia
- Chubby Wise (Robert Russell Wise, 1915–1996), American bluegrass fiddler
- Robert C. Wise (1925–2024), American politician in Pennsylvania
- Robert Wise, chairman and managing director of the Wise Music Group, sheet music publishers
- Robert E. Wise, American architect, founder of the Cramer, Bartlett & Wise firm in Los Angeles in the early 1900s

== See also ==
- Bob Wiese (1923–1971), American football player
- Bob Wiese (politician) (born 1940), Australian politician
- Robert Weiss (disambiguation)
