= Michael Weiss =

Michael Weiss may refer to:

== Sports ==
- Michael Weiss (figure skater) (born 1976), American former figure skater
- Michael Weiss (swimmer) (born 1991), American swimmer
- Michael Weiss (triathlete) (born 1981), Austrian triathlete and cyclist
- Michael Weiß (football manager) (born 1965), German association football coach

== Other ==
- Michael Weiss (engineer), American engineer in NASA in-orbit satellite program
- Michael Weiss (journalist), American journalist and author
- Michael Weiss (mathematician) (born 1955), German mathematician
- Michael Weiss (pianist) (born 1958), jazz pianist and composer
- Michael David Weiss (1967–1999), American lawyer who fought to provide nurses with safer syringes, as told in the 2011 feature film Puncture
- Michael T. Weiss (born 1962), American actor
- Michael Weiß (politician) (1569–1612), Transylvanian Saxon politician and historian
