= Thematic Mapper =

A Thematic Mapper (TM) is one of the Earth observing sensors introduced in the Landsat program. The first was placed aboard Landsat 4 (decommissioned in 2001), and another was operational aboard Landsat 5 up to 2012. ^{[2]} TM sensors feature seven bands of image data (three in visible wavelengths, four in infrared) most of which have 30 meter spatial resolution. TM is a whisk broom scanner which takes multi-spectral images across its ground track. It does not directly produce a thematic map.

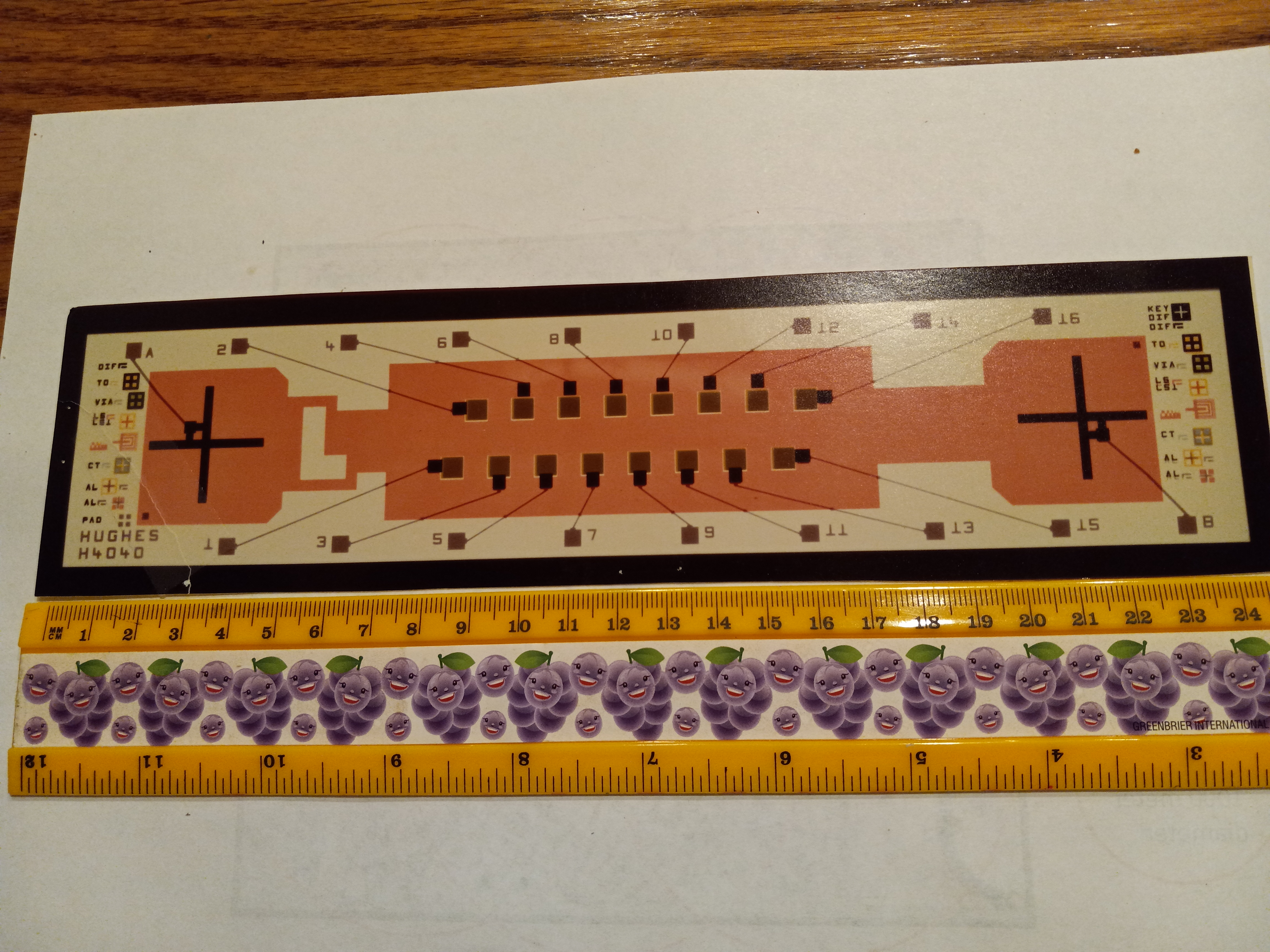

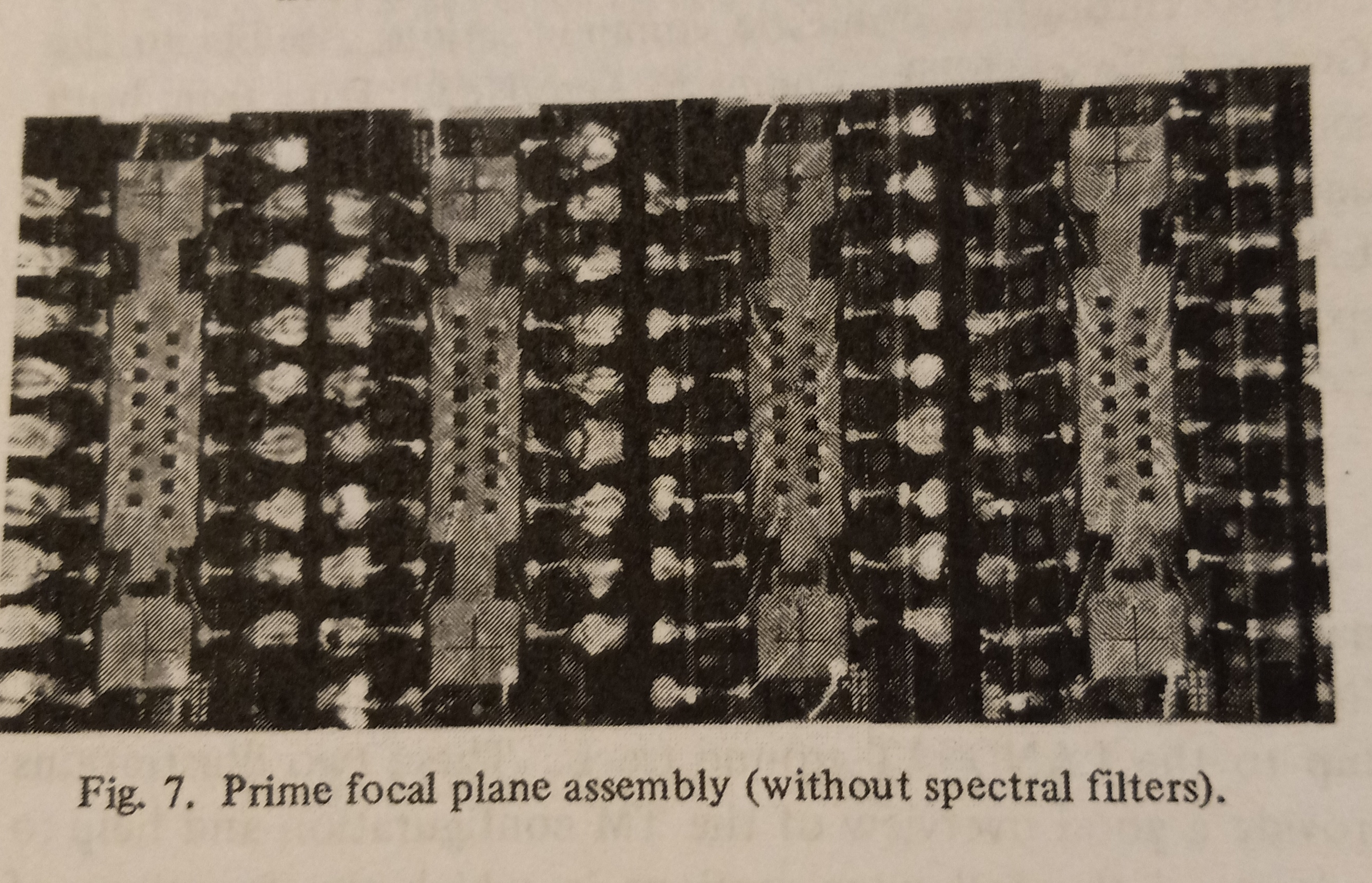
TM Focal Plane

The upper photo on the right is a 50 times magnification of the combined photomasks used to fabricate the Hughes H4040, the linear silicon photodiode array used in the Thematic Mapper to image the visible bands. Each of the 16 photodiodes is 100 microns square and their separation is 100 microns. There are two rows because it is scanned perpendicular to the lines of diodes and they produce a complete line with no separation. The alignment marks and their layer names can be seen at each end. Each layer is a different color. The pink layer is a second layer of aluminium acting as an aperture. The openings had to be 100u square exactly. The exact dimensions were required in order to achieve a 30 meter resolution on the ground. A set of four of these were fabricated and the fabrication process documented to NASA requirements and verified the dimensions as part of my employment at Hughes Aircraft Company's Industrial Products Division in Carlsbad California in 1978. The challenge was to customize each of these for one of the narrow visible bands that were required. To do that the thickness of the silicon nitride antireflective layer had to meet a precise target, for example, for one band the target was 120 nm while the next band required 130 nm. In addition all of the 16 photodiodes in the array had to have the same thickness. At the time all that was available to manufacture this film was an atmospheric deposition system that basically burned silane (SiH4) in the presence of ammonia in a horizontal tube heated to about 850 °C. But that process yielded a smoky film that varied significantly over the silicon wafer and the diode array. So with the help of a workmate who had invented low pressure (LPCVD) polysilicon deposition at Motorola a few years earlier a low pressure silicon nitride system was built using silane and ammonia to produce the precisely tunable and uniform thicknesses needed at each of the bands. Without that innovation there would have been no TM. The boron diffused photodiodes had to have very low dark current and high photosensitivity in order to meet the imager specifications. The large crosses visible on the pattern were used when the different arrays were aligned together at final assembly in the Thematic Mapper. The final assembly or the TM Focal Plane without filers is shown in the second photo to the right. ^{[2]} They flew in Landsat 4 and for 20 years maintained operation.

Also shown on the right is a letter of acknowledgement from Hughes Aircraft Company's Industrial Products Division (IPD) on the invention of the LPCVDs silicon nitride system that made the Thematic Mapper diode arrays possible.

Additionally a photo shows the Hughes (IPD) Newsletter from August 1978 highlighting the second level of aluminium that formed the light shield and set the aperture locations. It was a necessary requirement to prevent this shield from shorting out the lower layer aluminium leads to the photodiodes through defects and pinholes given that this layer was a large sheet over everything. Added ref 3.

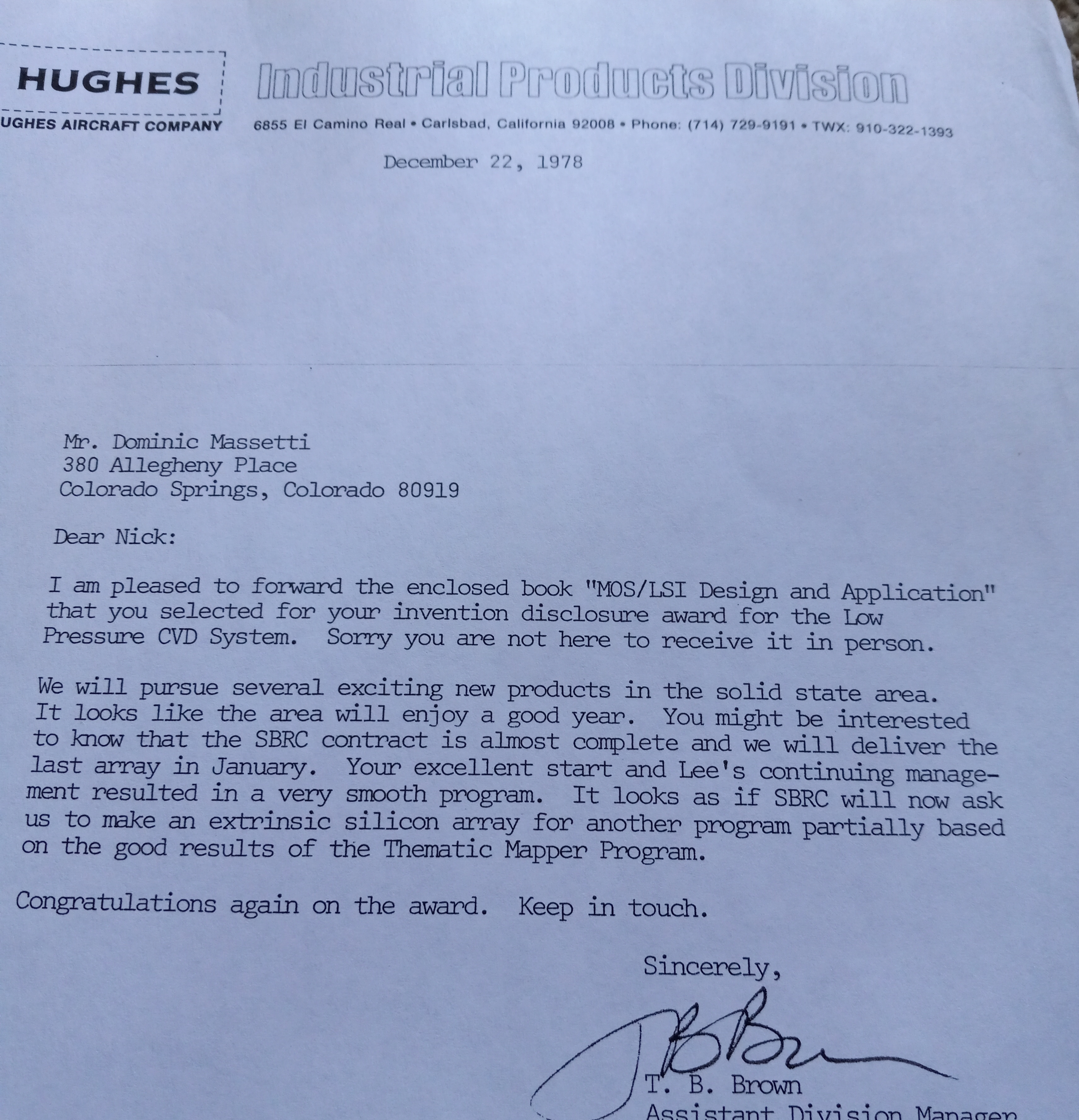
Hughes IPD Letter re award for LPCVD nitride invention and TM

.

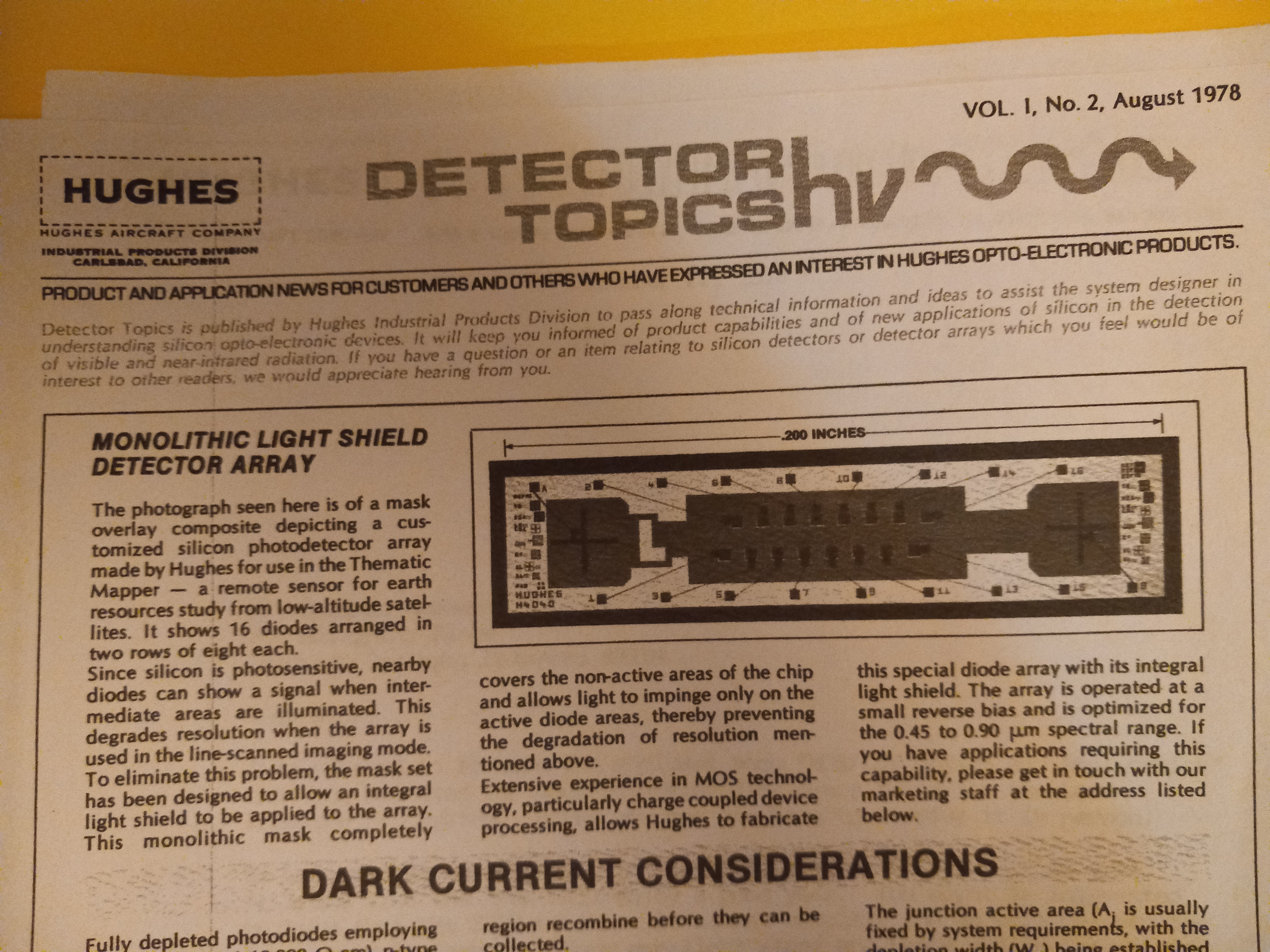
Hughes Aircraft Industrial Products Division Newsletter

The Thematic Mapper has become a useful tool in the study of albedo and its relationship to global warming and climate change. The TM on the Landsat 5 has proven useful in determining the amount of ice loss on glaciers due to melting.

Landsat 7 carries an enhanced TM sensor known as the Enhanced Thematic Mapper Plus (ETM+).
