= Relative time =

Relative time may refer to:

- Theory of relativity, Einstein's theory which predicts that two observers in relative motion or different gravitational fields may experience time at a different rate
  - Special relativity, an application of the theory of relativity to observers with different velocities
  - General relativity, an application of the theory of relativity to observers in different gravitational fields
- Relativity of simultaneity, a concept in special relativity that states that two observers in relative motion may not observe events in the same order
- Time dilation, a difference in elapsed time as measured by two clocks due to differences in relative velocity or gravitational field
- Time perception, the subjective psychological experience of the passing of time
- Time zone, a standardized set time for a specific geographical region on Earth
