= Samuel Weiss =

Samuel Weiss may refer to:

- Samuel Weiss (neurobiologist) (born 1955), Canadian neurobiologist
- Samuel A. Weiss (1902–1977), American politician and NFL deputy commissioner
- Samuel Weiss (mobster) (c. 1904–?), New York mobster
- Sam Weiss, a character from the TV series Fringe
