= Daniel Weiss =

Daniel or Dan Weiss may refer to:

- D. B. Weiss (born 1971), American television writer, director, and producer
- Daniel Weiss (art historian) (fl. 1979), president of the Metropolitan Museum of Art
- Daniel Weiss (figure skater) (born 1968), German figure skater
- Daniel Weiss (ice hockey) (born 1990), German ice hockey player
- Dan Weiss (basketball) (born 1966), US-born Japanese basketball player and coach
- Dan Weiss (drummer) (born 1977), American jazz drummer and composer
- Dan Weiss, birth name of American rapper Verbal Kent

== See also ==
- Danny Weis (born 1948), founding member of both Iron Butterfly and Rhinoceros
- Daniella Weiss (born 1945), Israeli settler, and founder of Nachala
