= Maria Weiss (singer) =

Austrian mezzo-soprano from Carinthia

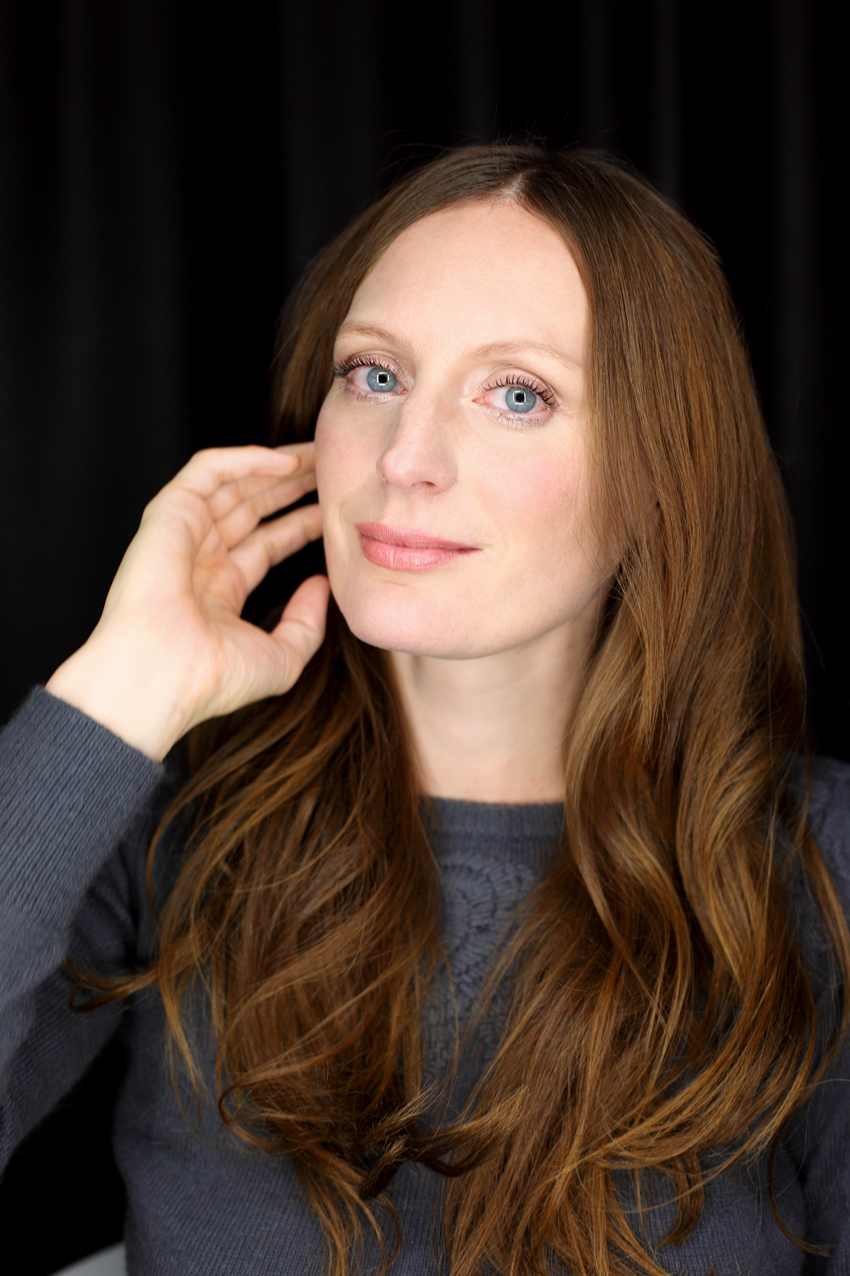
Maria Weiss

Maria Weiss is an Austrian mezzo-soprano from Carinthia who sings classical music from the Baroque period as well as more recent compositions, including Spanish and Latin-American works. After completing her studies under Joanna Borowska at the University of Music and Performing Arts in Graz in 2003, she received further training from Angelika Kirchschlager and Teresa Berganza. In 2009, she made her début at the Konzerthaus in Vienna singing Bach cantatas. She released her first solo CD Favola in musica, alte neue musik together with a hardcover book in 2015 as part of her award-winning cultural project Favola in musica. In 2018, she participated in the DonauFestwochen at Schloss Greinburg, playing the role of Irene in Handel's rarely performed opera Atalanta.

== Biography ==
Educated in music from the age of five, Maria Weiss sang works by Heinrich Schütz and J. S. Bach as a 13-year-old soloist in various ensembles. After studying cultural history at the Sorbonne, she received training in voice at the Conservatorio Luigi Cherubini in Florence and at the Arts University in Graz under Joanna Borowska, graduating in 2003. She later trained under Jorge Sirena in Barcelona and attended master classes with Angelika Kirchschlager and Teresa Berganza.

Her opera roles extend from Mozart to Renaissance and Baroque works as well as to operettas by Offenbach. She has performed in Handel's Ottone, Re di Germania and in Vivaldi's L'Olimpiade at the Donaufestwochen (2008). At the same festival in 2018, she played Irene in Handel's rarely performed opera Atalanta.

She has sung both Baroque music and modern pieces at various music festivals and in opera houses in Graz, Klagenfurt and Vienna. In particular, in March 2009 she sang as the alto in Bach cantatas with the Ensemble Claudiana under Luca Pianca at the Konzerthaus in Vienna.

Heading the project "Favola in Musica" (Fairy Tale in Music, from Monteverdi's full title for L'Orfeo), Weiss has presented biennial concerts of "alte neue Musik" (early new music) leading to a CD which won the Pasticcio Prize in 2018. The project was inspired by a course in project management from the Institut für Kulturkonzepte. Writing in Early Music Review, Brian Robins qualifies her voice as "distinctive, a beautifully burnished and rounded mezzo that at the same time remains fundamentally pure in tone, vibrato being sparingly used for expressive purpose".
