= David Weiss (physicist) =

American physicist

David S. Weiss
- Born: David S. Weiss
- Education: Amherst College (BA); Stanford University (PhD)
- Occupation: Physicist
- Scientific career
- Fields: Physics

David S. Weiss is an American physicist.

Weiss graduated from Amherst College in 1985 with a Bachelor of Arts in physics. He earned a Ph.D. in the same subject in 1993, from Stanford University. Weiss began his teaching career at the University of California, Berkeley, and joined the Pennsylvania State University faculty in 2001, where he later became a distinguished professor. He was elected a fellow of the American Physical Society in 2007, and the American Association for the Advancement of Science awarded him an equivalent honor in 2020. Weiss is the 2022 awardee of the Davisson-Germer Prize in Atomic or Surface Physics, conferred by the American Physical Society.
