= Brian Robins =

Brian Robins is an English nonfiction author and editor.

He edited the voluminous journals of the 18th-century English amateur composer, John Marsh, for publication in 1998. A review by the academic Nicholas Temperley in Music & Letters calls the publication a "significant event", though he doubts its claimed appeal to a wide audience; Temperley is critical of the meagre index of the 754-page work, which he describes as "seriously deficient", and calls attention to mistakes in the notes as well as deficiencies in the works list. A long review by H. Diack Johnstone for the Journal of the Royal Musical Association describes the project as a "monumental achievement", and praises Robins' "industry and indefatigable concern for detail", which he compares with that of the subject; Johnstone suggests that it would have been preferable to divide the material into two or three volumes, and also points out the inadequacies of the index. The edition was also reviewed in The Musical Times and Early Music.

Robins' monograph study of catch and glee culture in 18th-century England was published in 2006. William Weber, in a review for Journal of British Studies, describes it as a "major contribution to a little-studied subject" that is "accessible" to the general reader; he praises the book for its "vivid picture" of the places where these forms were performed and particularly appreciates the focus on settings outside London. Christina Bashford, in a review for Music & Letters, describes the book as "carefully documented", praises its "thorough, nuanced" descriptions of large numbers of groups, and highlights some "striking vignettes"; she criticises many of the chapters for failing to discuss "broader social and cultural themes and meanings".

== Publications ==
- Catch and Glee Culture in Eighteenth-Century England (Boydell; 2006)

Edited

- The John Marsh Journals: The Life and Times of a Gentleman Composer (1752–1828) (Pendragon Press; 1998)
