= Dominique Weis =

Canadian scientist and academic

Academic background
- Education: PhD., 1982, Université libre de Bruxelles

Academic work
- Discipline: Geochemistry
- Institutions: Université libre de Bruxelles; University of British Columbia

Dominique Weis FRSC is a Canadian scientist. She is a Canada Research Chair in the Geochemistry of the Earth's Mantle at the University of British Columbia.

== Early life and education ==
Weis obtained her BSc in geology and mineralogy (1979) and PhD (1982) from the Université libre de Bruxelles (Belgium). She later completed a master's degree in environmental sciences (1983) and Habilitation Geochemistry (1992) at the Université libre de Bruxelles.

She later undertook postdoctoral research fellowships at University of Paris VII (1984) and California Institute of Technology (1985–7). Weis was also a Chercheur Qualifié FNRS (1985–1993), Maître de Recherches (1993–1998) and Directeur de Recherches (1998–2001) at the Université libre de Bruxelles.

== Career ==
In 2002, Weis was appointed a Tier 1 Canada Research Chair at the University of British Columbia in Vancouver, Canada as she established the Pacific Centre for Isotopic and Geochemical Research (PCIGR).

By 2009, she was the recipient of the Killam Faculty Research Senior Fellows Award and renewed as a Canada Research Chair. The following year, the PCIGR was approved for funding from the Canada Foundation for Innovation and B.C. Knowledge Development Fund. This allowed the centre to update its geochemical analytical equipment. As a result of her research, Weis was elected a Geochemical Fellow by the Geochemical Society and the European Association of Geochemistry.

In 2016, Weis was elected to sit on the Geochemical Society Board and a Fellow of the Royal Society of Canada. In the following years, she was also renewed as a Canada Research Chair in the Geochemistry of the Earth’s Mantle and named President-elect of the Volcanology, Geochemistry, and Petrology Section of the American Geophysical Union.
