= Martin Weiss =

Martin Weiss may refer to:

- Martin Weiss (diplomat) (born 1962), Austrian diplomat and Ambassador of Austria to the United States
- Martin Weiss (Nazi official) (1903–1984), commander of Vilna Ghetto and the Ypatingasis būrys mass murder killing squad, convicted of war crimes (revoked)
- Martin Gottfried Weiss (1905–1946), SS Commander of German concentration camps, executed for war crimes

== See also ==
- Martin Weis (born 1970), German silver medallist at the 1998 World Rowing Championships
- Martin Weisz (born 1966), German music video and film director
