= Robert Weiss =

Robert Weiss or Weiß may refer to:

- Bob Weiss (born 1942), American basketball coach and former player
- Rob Weiss (fl. 1993), American television and film producer, screenwriter, actor and director
- Robert Weiss (choreographer) (fl. 1977), American ballet dancer, choreographer and artistic director
- Robert Weiss (therapist) (born c. 1960), American author and therapist specializing in sex addiction
- Robert A. Weiss (fl. 1978), American dermatologist
- Robert K. Weiss (fl. 1977–2014), American film producer
- Robert Weiß (pilot) (1920–1944), German World War II fighter ace
- Roberto Weiss (1906–1969), Italian-British historian of Renaissance culture

== See also ==
- Robert Wise (disambiguation)
- Bob Weis, American amusement park designer, architect, and author
- Bob Wiese (1923–1971), American football player
- Bob Wiese (politician) (born 1940), Australian politician
