= Multi-mission Modular Spacecraft =

Multi-mission Modular Spacecraft, also known as the MMS, was originally designed by NASA to serve the largest array of functions for the space program possible to decrease the cost of space missions. It was designed to operate in four distinct areas of missions. The MMS began development about a decade before it became implemented in the 1980s and 1990s. The basic MMS was made up of three different modules. They include the altitude control, communications and data handling, and the power subsystems. The idea of a modular system serving many purposes was the pioneer of the leading systems within the space technology ecosystem today as it has left a lasting legacy. The MMS was intended to be "Shuttle compatible", i.e. recoverable/serviceable by the Space Shuttle orbiter.

== Missions ==
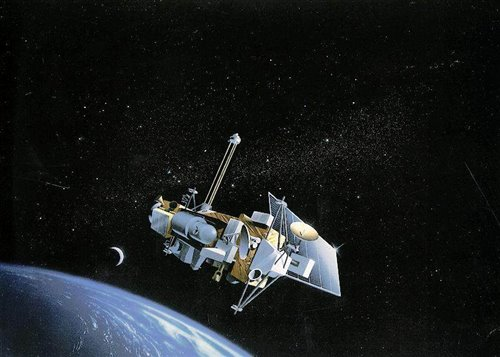

It was used for:

- Solar Maximum Mission (SMM), 1980
- Landsat 4, 1982
- Landsat 5, 1984
- Upper Atmosphere Research Satellite (UARS), 1991
- Extreme Ultraviolet Explorer (EUVE), 1992
- TOPEX/Poseidon, 1992

== Development ==
Before the MMS was the standardized space ship system, they began studying how to make a cost effective method of Space exploration. To achieve lower cost space travel, NASA's approached the idea with a production line mentality, to have inherited parts in as many aspects of the rocket as possible to allow fast production. The first idea was to use existing spacecraft designs, but with slight modifications. The main issue was designing a computer that could service any mission with slight modifications to the mission. To do this, they developed a computer for the MMS that could service various types of missions within the Solar System such as: solar, stellar, and Earth missions. By designing this space computer to be easily changed, instead of building a new computer with all new hardware every mission, they only had to make software changes. This design greatly reduced cost when developing new spacecraft.

== Modules ==
What made MMS so effective was the adaptability of the spacecraft to be able to conduct missions in a multitude of areas. The MMS was designed using multiple modules that made this possible. The modules include ACS Module, Power Module, Small Impulse Propulsion Module, Large Impulse Propulsion Module, C & CH Module, and Module support structure. This system allows for interchangeable software and hardware, and ultimately allows it to be repaired to be used at a lower cost level.
