= Landsat 4 =

American earth observation satellite (1982–2001)

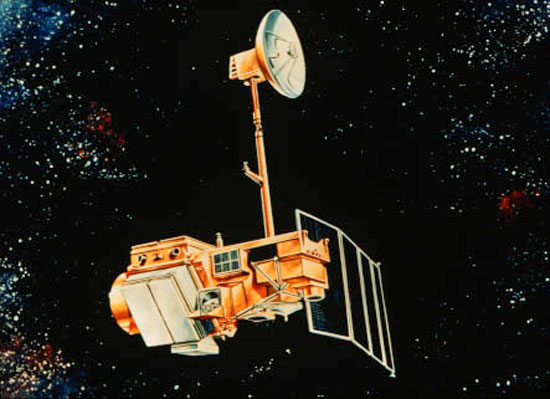
- Artist's rendering of Landsat 5, which is identical to Landsat 4.
- Mission type: Earth observations
- Operator: NASA / NOAA
- COSPAR ID: 1982-072A
- SATCAT no.: 13367
- Mission duration: 3 years (planned); 18 years, 10 months, 30 days (final)

Spacecraft properties
- Bus: Multimission Modular Spacecraft
- Manufacturer: GE Astro Space
- Launch mass: 1,941 kg (4,279 lb)
- Dry mass: 1,407 kg (3,102 lb)
- Power: 1,430 W

Start of mission
- Launch date: 16 July 1982, 17:59 UTC
- Rocket: Delta 3920
- Launch site: Vandenberg AFB SLC-2W

End of mission
- Disposal: Decommissioned
- Declared: 14 December 1993
- Deactivated: 15 June 2001
- Decay date: 8 October 2025

Orbital parameters
- Reference system: Geocentric
- Regime: Sun-synchronous
- Perigee altitude: 700 km (430 mi)
- Apogee altitude: 704 km (437 mi)
- Inclination: 98.2°
- Period: 98.81 minutes
- Repeat interval: 16 days
- Epoch: August 17, 1982
Instruments
- MSS: Multispectral Scanner
- TM: Thematic Mapper

Landsat 4 is the fourth satellite of the Landsat program. It was launched on 16 July 1982, with the primary goal of providing a global archive of satellite imagery. Although the Landsat program is managed by NASA, data from Landsat 4 was collected and distributed by the U.S. Geological Survey. Landsat 4 science operations ended on 14 December 1993, when the satellite lost its ability to transmit science data, far beyond its designed life expectancy of five years. The satellite housekeeping telemetry and tracking continued to be maintained by NASA until it was decommissioned on 15 June 2001.

== Background ==
Landsat 1, then known as ERTA-A, was launched July 23, 1972. The satellite took over 100,000 images of the Earth over the course of its life. Landsat 2 had a similar design, and was launched three years later. Landsat 3, launched in 1978, was the last satellite to have a similar design to Landsat 1, and was the last Landsat to be managed by NASA during the Landsat program. Landsat 4 was the first Landsat to be operated by NOAA.

The second generation of Landsat, Landsat 4 and 5, flew in lower orbits than the first three missions. Although they were in lower orbits, they had a higher field of view (FOV) so they had the same swath widths. The new Landsat spacecraft also featured improved instrumentation.

== Satellite design ==
=== Operation ===
The spacecraft was built by GE Astro Space, who would later become Lockheed Martin Missile and Space. It used the MultiMission Modular Spacecraft (MMS) bus developed by Fairchild Industries.

The satellite was designed to be fixed by astronauts in space via the Space Shuttle, or taken back to Earth for repairs. It was expected that the shuttles would be able to reach Landsat's relatively far orbit by 1985.

Landsat 4's attitude was controlled with hydrazine thrusters. The satellite was constructed with aluminum panels and graphite struts. The spacecraft was three-axis stabilized with reaction wheels. It was powered by three nickel-cadmium batteries (NiCd), which were charged via a single solar array that had one axis of articulation. The solar array produced 1430 W of power. The satellite weighed 4,300 lb (2,000 kg). Landsat 4 was designed to last a minimum of three years.

The satellite communicated to the ground with a direct downlink with the Tracking and Data Relay Satellite System (TDRSS) at 85 Mbit/s on the S-, X-, L-, and Ku-bands. The high gain antenna was extended with a retractable boom. The data used 8 bit quantization.

=== Sensors ===
Landsat 4 carried an updated Multispectral Scanner (MSS), used on previous Landsat satellites, and a Thematic Mapper. It had a reflective resolution of 30 m (98 ft) and a thermal resolution of 120 m (390 ft). Both were built by Hughes Aircraft.

Landsat 4 was the first satellite in the Landsat program to incorporate the Thematic Mapper (TM) sensor. The Landsat TM sensor is able to gather seven bands of data as opposed to the four bands of data collected from the Multispectral Scanner. In addition to having three more bands of data to work with, scientists are able to view the TM data at a much higher resolution than with MSS. Bands 1–5 and 7 each have a spatial resolution of 30 m (98 ft) while the MSS is only capable of a 57 m (187 ft) by 79 m (259 ft) resolution. Band 6 (which is a thermal infrared band) has a maximum spatial resolution of 120 m (390 ft).

== Mission ==
=== Launch ===
The satellite was launched from Vandenberg Air Force Base in California on 16 July 1982, on a Delta 3920. Landsat 4 was placed into a north–south near polar orbit, approximately 700 km (430 mi) above Earth's surface, and circling the globe every 99 minutes.

=== Operations ===
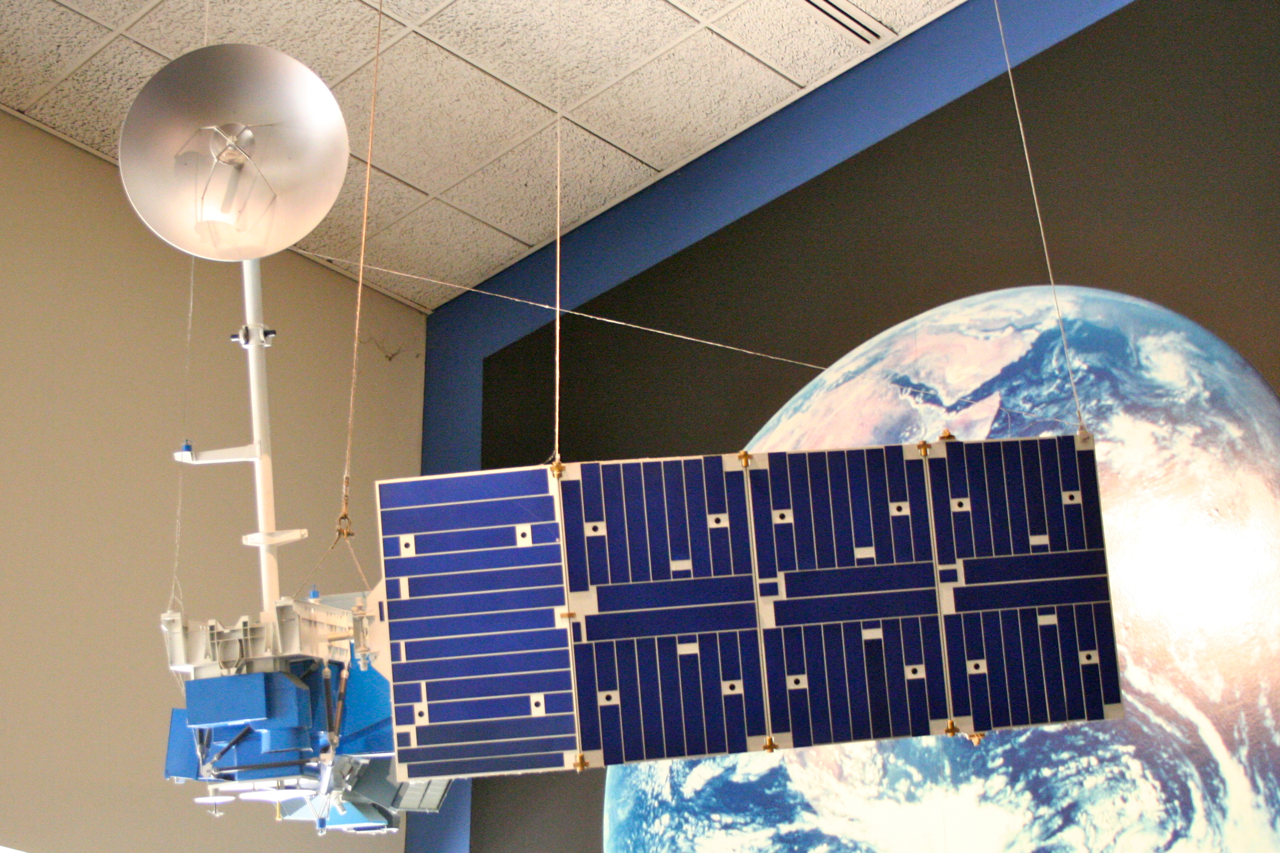
1/4 scale model on display at the National Air and Space Museum in Washington DC

The first major malfunction occurred July 27, 1982. The high gain Ku antenna was commanded to deploy but failed. Attempts to free the antenna were successful on August 15.

In February 1983, the satellite lost half of its solar power and the ability to send science data directly to Earth, prompting fears the satellite would fail sooner than expected. This caused the early launch of Landsat 5, a satellite that was identical in specification to Landsat 4. After the issue was identified in Landsat 4, modifications were made to Landsat 5 to prevent the same issue from occurring.

Landsat 4 was able to resume science operations when the Tracking and Data Relay Satellite System (TDRS) came online, then was placed in standby in January 1986. Landsat 4 was brought back online to provide international coverage in 1987, when Landsat 5 lost its TDRS link, and thus the ability to image areas beyond line of sight to a ground station, and continued to do so until it, too, lost its TDRS link in 1993, ending science data return. Landsat 4 continued to broadcast telemetry, tracking, and command data, which was transmitted on the still-functional S-band, until the satellite was decommissioned June 15, 2001.

=== Space Shuttle service mission ===
As early as 1982, a mission was in the planning stages to retrieve Landsat 4 for servicing back on Earth. The 1982 edition of the STS Flight Assignment Manifest scheduled the second Space Shuttle mission from Vandenberg AFB for that task. The Space Shuttle Discovery was scheduled to launch on 15 June 1986 for a three-day mission to capture Landsat 4 for return to Earth (designated STS-2V). The following year, the mission was rescheduled to launch on 1 April 1986. Later on, the idea to retrieve Landsat 4 was first replaced by a servicing mission in early 1987, before any mention of it was removed from the flight manifest published in June 1985. The slot for the proposed mission was first assigned to a dedicated Space Shuttle flight for the Department of Defense before the idea of launching the Space Shuttle from Vandenberg AFB was scrapped altogether after the Challenger disaster.
