= Extreme Ultraviolet Explorer =

NASA satellite of the Explorer program

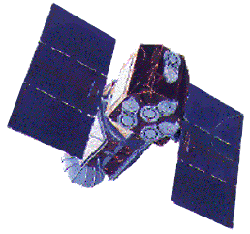
- EUVE spacecraft
- Names: Explorer 67; EUVE
- Mission type: Ultraviolet astronomy
- Operator: NASA
- COSPAR ID: 1992-031A
- SATCAT no.: 21987
- Website: ssl.berkeley.edu/euve
- Mission duration: 6 months (planned); 8.5 years (achieved)

Spacecraft properties
- Spacecraft: Explorer LXVII
- Spacecraft type: Extreme Ultraviolet Explorer
- Bus: Multi-mission Modular Spacecraft (MMS)
- Manufacturer: Space Sciences Laboratory
- Launch mass: 3,275 kg (7,220 lb)
- Power: 1100 watts

Start of mission
- Launch date: 7 June 1992, 16:40:00 UTC
- Rocket: Delta 6920-10 (Delta 210)
- Launch site: Cape Canaveral, LC-17A
- Contractor: McDonnell Douglas Astronautics Company
- Entered service: 7 June 1992

End of mission
- Deactivated: 31 January 2001
- Last contact: 2 February 2001
- Decay date: 31 January 2002

Orbital parameters
- Reference system: Geocentric orbit
- Regime: Low Earth orbit
- Perigee altitude: 515 km (320 mi)
- Apogee altitude: 527 km (327 mi)
- Inclination: 28.40°
- Period: 94.80 minutes

Instruments
- Extreme Ultraviolet Deep-Sky Survey; Extreme Ultraviolet Full-Sky Survey

The Extreme Ultraviolet Explorer (EUVE or Explorer 67) was a NASA space telescope for ultraviolet astronomy. EUVE was a part of NASA's Explorer spacecraft series. Launched on 7 June 1992 with instruments for ultraviolet (UV) radiation between wavelengths of 7 and 76 nm (equivalent to 0.016–0.163 keV in energy), the EUVE was the first satellite mission especially for the short-wave ultraviolet range. The satellite compiled an all-sky survey of 801 astronomical targets before being decommissioned on 31 January 2001.

== Mission ==
The Extreme-Ultraviolet Explorer (EUVE) was a spinning spacecraft designed to rotate about the Earth/Sun line. EUVE was a part of NASA's Explorer spacecraft series and designed to operate in the extreme ultraviolet (EUV) range of the spectrum, from 70 to 760 Ångström (Å). This spacecraft's objective was to carry out a full-sky survey, and subsequently, a deep survey and pointed observations. Science objectives included discovering and studying UV sources radiating in this spectral region, and analyzing effects of the interstellar medium on the radiation from these sources. The proposal for the craft originated with the Space Astrophysics Group at the University of California Berkeley who had previously been involved with the EUV telescope on the Apollo element of the Apollo–Soyuz mission.

The full-sky survey was accomplished by three Wolter-Schwarzschild grazing-incidence telescopes. During the sky survey, the satellite was spun three times per orbit to image a 2° wide band of sky in each of four EUV passbands. The deep survey was accomplished with a fourth Wolter-Schwarzschild grazing-incidence telescope, within a 2 × 180° region of sky. This telescope was also used for three-EUV bandpass spectroscopy of individual sources, providing ~ 1–2 Å resolution spectra.

The goals of the mission included several different areas of observation using the extreme ultraviolet (EUV) range of frequencies:

- To make an all-sky survey in the extreme ultraviolet band;
- To make a deep survey in the EUV range on two separate bandpasses;
- To make spectroscopic observations of targets found by other missions;
- To observe EUV sources such as hot white dwarfs and coronal stars;
- To study the composition of the interstellar medium using EUV spectroscopy;
- To determine whether it would be beneficial to create another, more sensitive EUV telescope.

== Spacecraft ==
The science instruments were attached to a Multi-mission Modular Spacecraft (MMS). The MMS was 3-axis stabilized, with a stellar reference control system and solar arrays.

== Payload instruments ==
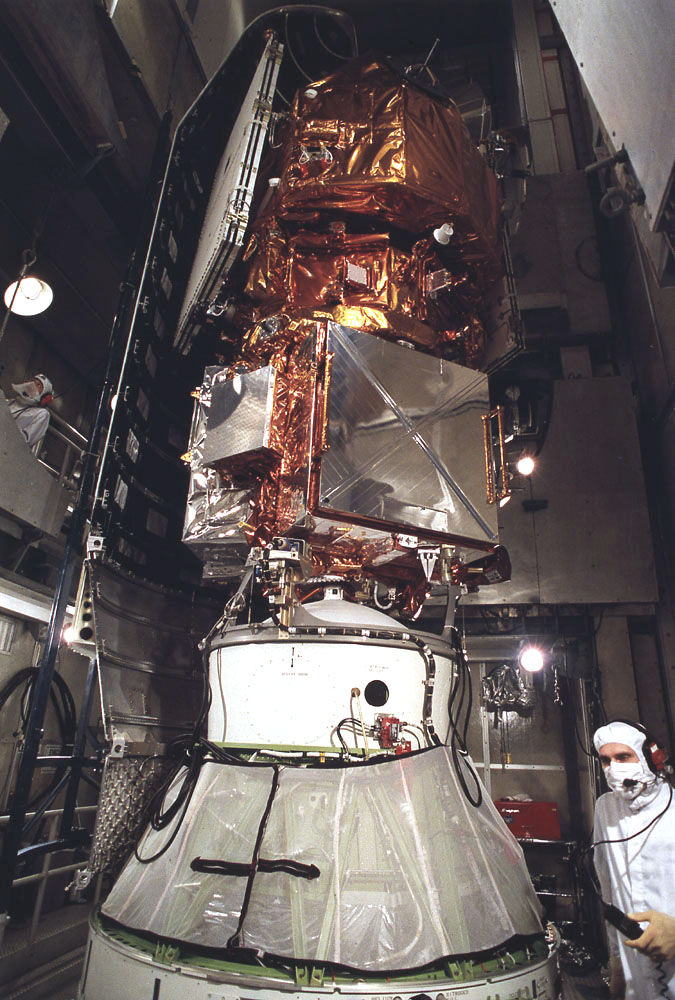
The Extreme Ultraviolet Explorer spacecraft prior to launch

NASA described these instruments:

- 2 Wolter-Schwarzschild Type I grazing incidence mirror, each with an imaging microchannel plate (MCP detector) (Scanner A & B) FoV ~5° diameter; two passbands 44–220 Å 140–360 Å;
- 1 Wolter-Schwarzschild Type II grazing incidence mirror, with an imaging Micro-Channel Plate (MCP detector) FoV ~4° diameter; two passbands 520–750 Å and 400–600 Å;
- 1 Wolter-Schwarzschild Type II grazing incidence mirror Deep Survey/Spectrometer Telescope. The light is split, with half of the light fed to:
  - An imaging deep survey MCP detector, and
  - Three spectrometers which are each combinations of a grating and MCP detector: SW (70–190 Å), MW (140–380 Å), LW (280–760 Å).

== Experiments ==
=== Extreme Ultraviolet Deep-Sky Survey ===
The EUVE Spectrometer was a three-fold symmetric slitless objective design based on variable line space grazing incidence reflection gratings. Photon images are accumulated simultaneously in three bandpasses with effective spectral resolutions of 200–400 in 3 bandpasses from 70 to 760 Å. The Spectrometer and Deep Survey instruments share the DS/S mirror. The regions of the mirror devoted to the spectrometer and Deep Survey were defined at the front aperture, which was an annulus divided into six segments. Each of the spectrometer channels receives a beam of light from one of three alternating segments. This division gives each channel a geometric area of 75 cm^{2} (11.6 sq in). After the mirror, each converging beam then strikes one of three gratings which focus the spectra onto three detectors, arranged in a circle around the central Deep Survey detector. The throughput of the EUVE Spectrometer was determined by the combined effects of the mirrors' and gratings' coating reflectivities, which were functions of both wavelength and grazing angle, the filter transmissions, and the quantum efficiency functions of the detector photocathode materials.

==== Collimators and Sky Background ====
In order to achieve good spectral resolution, any EUV spectrometer must be designed to limit the effect of diffuse sky radiation. The medium and long wavelength channels of the EUVE Spectrometer have wire-grid collimators placed directly after the aperture before the mirror, which limit the grazing angles of the incident light to exclude some of the sky background. They consist of 15 etched molybdenum grids, spaced exponentially and held in a thermally stable claw structure, also of molybdenum. The transmission profile of the stack is triangular in the dispersion direction and limits the beam to 20 arcminutes FWHM. The transmission of each collimator assembly was tested in visible light. The collimator relative transmissions were measured in the EUV by comparing the Spectrometer throughputs, measured as a function of off-axis angle, before and after installation of the collimators in the medium and long wavelength channels. Alignment to the boresight of the instrument was also determined. Both collimators functioned as designed, with peak transmissions of 64.2% and 65.4% in the medium and long wavelength channels, respectively.

==== Variable Line Space Gratings ====
The EUVE Spectrometer incorporated plane diffraction gratings with continuously varying line spacing, placed in the converging beam of the telescope to diffract the light as it approached the focus. Like concave gratings, they obviate the use of other focusing optics after dispersion. Unlike uniformly spaced rulings, variable line space gratings can produce nearly stigmatic spectra using straight, conventionally ruled grooves. The gratings are blazed for use in the first inside order. "Inside" was used to mean diffracted orders at angles between the surface normal and the specular direction, and was referred to with a minus sign when represented numerically, e.g. −1st order. The gratings cover three overlapping bandpasses; short wavelengths from 70 to 190 A, medium wavelengths from 140 to 380 A, and long wavelengths from 280 to 760 Å. The groove densities range from 415 to 3550 grooves/mm. The gratings were ruled by Hitachi, Inc. at the Naka Optical Works in Japan. The short wavelength grating is coated with rhodium to optimize the reflectivity between 70 and 190 Å. The medium and long wavelength gratings have platinum surface coatings.

==== Spectrometer Filters ====
Thin film filters, a few thousand Å thick, completely covered each detector. They define broad bandpasses while screening out bright geocoronal and interplanetary lines such as Lyman alpha radiation and some higher orders of diffraction. The materials were Lexan and boron in the short wavelength, aluminum and carbon in the medium, and aluminum in the long wavelength channel. The two longer wavelength filters have an off-axis quadrant of material which covered the same bandpass as one of the shorter channels. At these positions, which correspond to off-axis angles of approximately 0.5°, some wavelengths that would normally lie in the shorter channel's range appear in the longer wavelength channel in second order (n=−2), and are passed by the alternate filter. Wavelengths from parts of the shorter bandpass that overlap the longer channel also appear in first order. These off-axis locations are configured to be used as backups to duplicate the short and medium channels, should either of these detectors fail.

==== Micro-Channel Plate Detectors ====
All the EUVE detectors were microchannel plate (MCP) detectors. MCP detectors are electron-amplification devices that provided two-dimensional imaging and time-tagging of individual EUV photon events. Each detector employs a biased stack of three porous quartz MCPs with a channel length-to-diameter ratio of approximately 80:1. The stack acts as an electron multiplier, and is backed by a conducting anode, partitioned into a graduated "wedge, strip, and zigzag" pattern. The top plate has an applied photocathode of potassium bromide (KBr), to enhanced the photoelectric response at EUV wavelengths. When a photon excited the front surface, a bias of 4–5 kV causes cascading electrons to form a cloud of 2–3×10^{7} electrons, which then strikes the divided anode. Event positions (X, Y) are calculated by onboard instrument software (ISW) from the division of the charge cloud among the wedge, strip, and zigzag areas of the anode. The detectors record positions 0–2047 in each dimension, and a single pixel is about 29×29 mc. This resulted in a pixel size of roughly 4.25 seconds when remapped to the sky. All the detectors were equipped with four stimulation pulser ("stimpulser" or "stim") pins, which periodically excite the anode at standard positions, and are used to monitor position stability. The detectors have been placed at the sagittal intersection to produce good imaging over the whole detector, rather than optimized spectral focus at one point.

=== Extreme Ultraviolet Full-Sky Survey ===
This investigation is designed to perform a full-sky survey, searching for EUV sources. The instrument package contains four Wolter-Schwarzschild grazing-incidence telescopes (with EUV thin-film filters) to collect and to isolate radiation. The detector system for each telescope was a wedge and strip anode image converter, consisting of a micro-channel plate, a wedge and strip anode, and detector amplifiers designed to produce images of sky fields in selected wavelength ranges. Three telescopes are designed to operate at right angles to the spin axis and to carry out the sky survey, with bandpass filters (tentatively) for the wavelength ranges 80 to 190 Å, 170 to 330 Å, and 500 to 750 Å. These three telescopes point perpendicular to the Earth-Sun line and sweep out a great circle in the sky with each spacecraft's revolution. As the Earth moves around the Sun, the great circle is shifted by 1° each day and so the entire celestial sphere is surveyed in 6 months. The fourth telescope points in the anti-solar direction, within the Earth's shadow cone. In this limited direction, the He II 304 Å background is almost completely absent, and thus higher sensitivity can be obtained for observing selected interesting objects. Spectroscopic observations of the brightest EUV sources are carried out with a resolving power of 100 from 80 to 800 Å.

The full-sky survey was completed in August 1993 by which time 801 UV sources had been observed.

== Atmospheric entry ==
The EUVE mission was extended twice, but cost and scientific merit issues led NASA to a decision to terminate the mission in 2000. EUVE satellite operations ended on 31 January 2001 when the spacecraft was placed in a safehold. Transmitters were commanded off on 2 February 2001. EUVE re-entered in the atmosphere of Earth over central Egypt at approximately 04:15 UTC on 31 January 2002. The mission is considered a success since it accomplished its scientific, technological, and outreach goals.

== See also ==
- Explorer program
- 1992 in spaceflight
