= Landsat 5 =

American earth observation satellite (1984–2013)

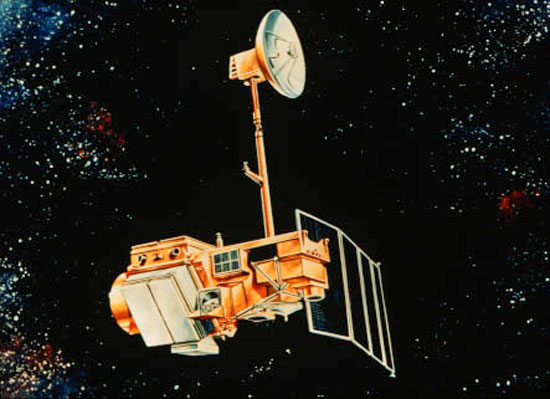
- Artist's rendering of Landsat 5.
- Mission type: Earth imaging
- Operator: NASA / NOAA
- COSPAR ID: 1984-021A
- SATCAT no.: 14780
- Mission duration: 29 years, 3 months and 4 days

Spacecraft properties
- Bus: Multimission Modular Spacecraft
- Manufacturer: Fairchild Industries
- Launch mass: 1,938 kg (4,273 lb)
- Dry mass: 1,407 kg (3,102 lb)

Start of mission
- Launch date: 1 March 1984, 17:59 UTC
- Rocket: Delta 3920
- Launch site: Vandenberg SLC-2W

End of mission
- Disposal: Decommissioned
- Deactivated: 5 June 2013

Orbital parameters
- Reference system: Geocentric
- Regime: Sun-synchronous
- Perigee altitude: 694 kilometers (431 mi)
- Apogee altitude: 701 kilometers (436 mi)
- Inclination: 98.2 degrees
- Period: 98.72 minutes
- Repeat interval: 16 days
- Epoch: 1 April 1984

Landsat 5 was a low Earth orbit satellite launched on March 1, 1984, to collect imagery of the surface of Earth. A continuation of the Landsat Program, Landsat 5 was jointly managed by the U.S. Geological Survey (USGS) and the National Aeronautics and Space Administration (NASA). Data from Landsat 5 was collected and distributed from the USGS's Center for Earth Resources Observation and Science (EROS).

After 29 years in space, Landsat 5 was officially decommissioned on June 5, 2013. Near the end of its mission, Landsat 5's use was hampered by equipment failures, and it was largely superseded by Landsat 7 and Landsat 8. Mission scientists anticipated the satellite will re-enter Earth's atmosphere and disintegrate around 2034.

Recognized by Guinness World Records as the longest-operating Earth-observing satellite mission in history, Landsat 5 orbited the planet more than 150,000 times while transmitting more than 2.5 million images of land surface conditions around the world, greatly outliving its original three-year design life.

== Specifications ==
Landsat 5 had a maximum transmission bandwidth of 85 Mbit/s. It was deployed at an altitude of 705.3 km (438.3 mi), and it took about 16 days to scan the entire Earth. The satellite was an identical copy of Landsat 4 and was originally intended as a backup. Therefore, Landsat 5 carried the same instruments, including the 30m resolution Thematic Mapper and 60m Multi-Spectral Scanner. The Multi-Spectral Scanner was powered down in 1995, but reactivated again in 2012.

== Mission history ==
Landsat 5 was launched by NASA from Vandenberg Air Force Base on March 1, 1984.

Landsat 5 recorded many significant events. It was the first satellite to capture the nuclear accident at Chernobyl in 1986. Landsat 5 also documented deforestation occurring in tropical regions, and captured the devastating 2004 tsunami in southeast Asia.

On November 26, 2005, the back-up solar array drive on Landsat 5 began exhibiting unusual behavior. The solar array drive maintains the proper pointing angle between the solar array and the Sun. The rotation of the solar array drive became sporadic, and the solar array was not able to provide the power needed to charge the batteries. Maintaining power to the batteries is critical to sustain proper operation of the spacecraft. The primary solar array drive failed under similar circumstances in January 2006. As a result of this situation, imaging operations were suspended. After a month-long investigation in December 2005 and testing in January 2006, new operating procedures were developed that would allow Landsat 5 to continue normal operations.

On December 18, 2009, the transmitter on Landsat 5 experienced technical difficulties. Data downlink was restored on January 7, 2010, after a test successfully managed to retrieve a picture over North America. This test exercised the only remaining Traveling Wave Tube Amplifier (TWTA). The remaining TWTA is in fact the primary TWTA that was in operation when Landsat 5 launched in 1984. After several issues in late 1986 and 1987, the primary TWTA was turned off and the secondary redundant TWTA was used. The USGS Flight Operations Team applied lessons learned while operating the redundant TWTA to the primary TWTA for its first successful transmission in over 22 years.

On November 18, 2011, image acquisitions were suspended for a period of 90 days, due to fluctuations in the performance of a critical amplifier in the satellite's transmission system. USGS indicated the satellite was nearing the end of its life, after more than 27 years in space.

== Longevity ==
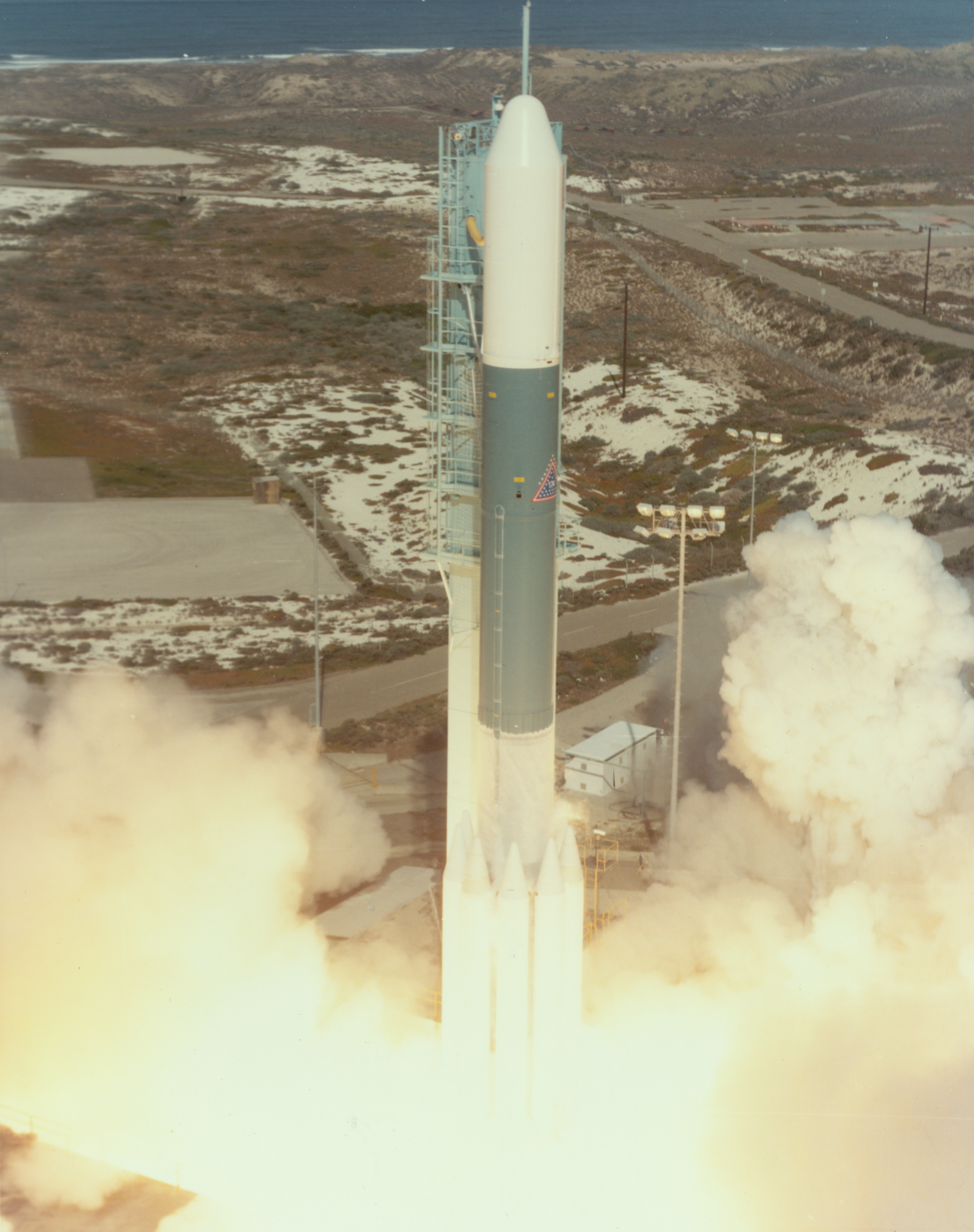
Delta rocket launching Landsat 5 out of Vandenberg Air Force Base

Landsat 5 significantly exceeded its designed life expectancy, lasting several decades beyond its original three-year mission. Contributing to Landsat 5's longevity was the presence of extra fuel for possible future retrieval by the Space Shuttle. If the need arose, Landsat 5 could use the extra fuel to move into a lower orbit. Instead, the extra fuel was used to maintain its existing orbit as long as practicable.

On February 10, 2013, NASA announced that the Guinness World Records had awarded Landsat 5 the world record for "longest-operating Earth observation satellite" at 28 years, 10 months and counting.

== End of mission ==
In mid-2012, with the satellite suffering multiple mechanical failures, the USGS Landsat team began planning a complex series of steps to ensure that the satellite's decommissioning would meet the requirements set under international agreements. When planning began, a date for decommissioning had not yet been set. However, in November 2012, one of Landsat 5's redundant gyroscopes failed, leaving only two operational. If one more failed, the satellite would be left derelict in its valued orbital band. Considering these circumstances, USGS announced on December 21, 2012, that Landsat 5 would be permanently decommissioned as soon as practicable.

Landsat 5 transmitted its last image on January 6, 2013. Nine days later, USGS Mission Operations began the process of maneuvering the satellite from its 438-mile-high (705 km) operational orbit into a lower disposal orbit. On June 5, 2013, with Landsat 5's fuel reserve completely depleted, the USGS Flight Operations Team issued commands to shut off all moving mechanisms and hobble the spacecraft's ability to generate and store power from its solar arrays. The final command shut down Landsat 5's transmitter, silencing the mission permanently and effectively terminating the mission 29 years, 3 months and 4 days after its launch.

At the time of Landsat 5's decommissioning, Landsat 7 (launched in 1999) and Landsat 8 (launched in 2013) remained in orbit. Landsat 8 came online only a few weeks prior to Landsat 5's decommissioning.

== See also ==
- NASA World Wind (uses Geocover 1990 layer made from Landsat 4 & 5 data)
