= Upper Atmosphere Research Satellite =

NASA-operated orbital observatory (1991-2011)

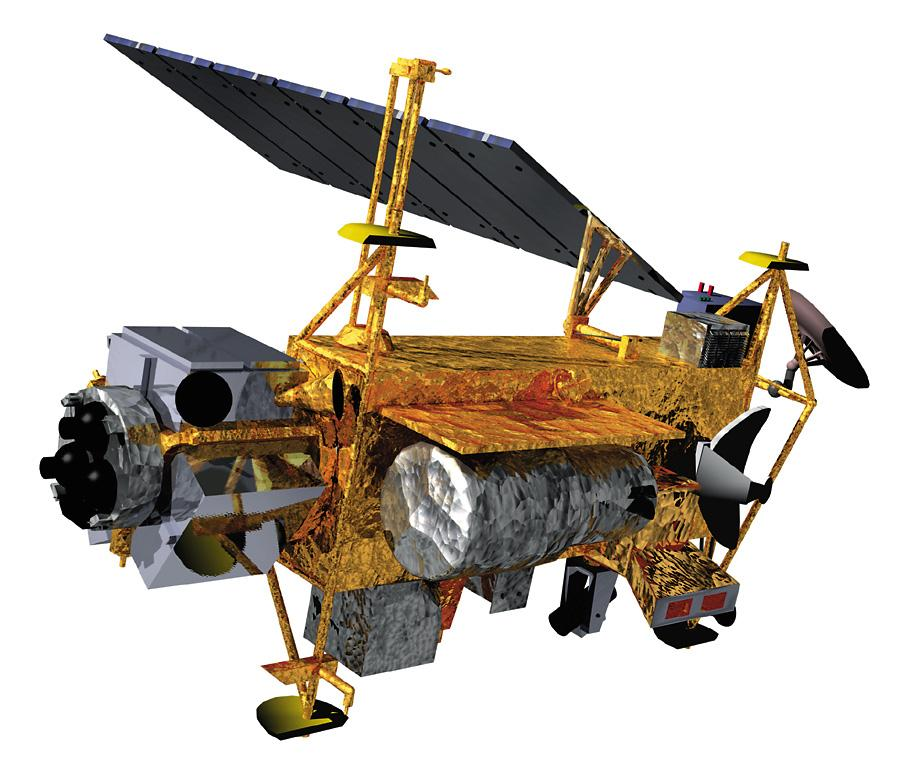
- Mission type: Earth observation
- Operator: NASA
- COSPAR ID: 1991-063B
- SATCAT no.: 21701
- Website: http://umpgal.gsfc.nasa.gov/
- Mission duration: 14 years, 3 months and 3 days

Spacecraft properties
- Bus: MultiMission Modular Spacecraft
- Manufacturer: Martin Marietta
- Launch mass: 6,540 kg (14,420 lb)
- Dry mass: 5,900 kg (13,000 lb)
- Power: 1,600 watts

Start of mission
- Launch date: 12 September 1991, 23:11:04 UTC
- Rocket: Space Shuttle Discovery; STS-48
- Launch site: Kennedy LC-39A
- Contractor: NASA

End of mission
- Disposal: Decommissioned
- Deactivated: 15 December 2005
- Decay date: 24 September 2011

Orbital parameters
- Reference system: Geocentric
- Regime: Low Earth
- Semi-major axis: 6,953.0 kilometers (4,320.4 mi)
- Eccentricity: 0.0003645
- Perigee altitude: 574.0 km (356.7 mi)
- Apogee altitude: 575.0 km (357.3 mi)
- Inclination: 56.97999954223633°
- Period: 95.9 minutes
- Epoch: 14 September 1991, 20:00:00 UTC
Instruments
- CLAES: Cryogenic Limb Array Etalon Spectrometer
- ISAMS: Improved Stratospheric and Mesospheric Sounder
- MLS: Microwave Limb Sounder
- HALOE: Halogen Occultation Experiment
- HRDI: High Resolution Doppler Imager
- WINDII: Wind Imaging Interferometer
- SUSIM: Solar Ultraviolet Spectral Irradiance Monitor
- SOLSTICE: Solar Stellar Irradiance Comparison Experiment
- PEM: Particle Environment Monitor
- ACRIM2: Active Cavity Radiometer Irradiance Monitor II

The Upper Atmosphere Research Satellite (UARS) was a NASA-operated orbital observatory whose mission was to study the Earth's atmosphere, particularly the protective ozone layer. The 5,900-kilogram (13,000 lb) satellite was deployed from Space Shuttle Discovery during the STS-48 mission on 15 September 1991. It entered Earth orbit at an operational altitude of 600 kilometers (370 mi), with an orbital inclination of 57 degrees.

The original mission duration was to be only three years, but was extended several times. When the mission finally ended in June 2005 due to funding cuts, 14 years after the satellite's launch, six of its ten instruments were still operational. A final orbit-lowering burn was performed in early December 2005 to prepare the satellite for deorbit. On 26 October 2010, the International Space Station performed a debris-avoidance maneuver in response to a conjunction with UARS.

The decommissioned satellite re-entered Earth's atmosphere on 24 September 2011. Considerable media attention surrounded the event, largely due to NASA's predictions that substantial parts of the satellite might reach the ground, potentially endangering inhabited areas. However, the satellite ultimately impacted in a remote area of the Pacific Ocean.

== Instruments ==
=== Chemical studies ===
==== Cryogenic Limb Array Etalon Spectrometer (CLAES) ====
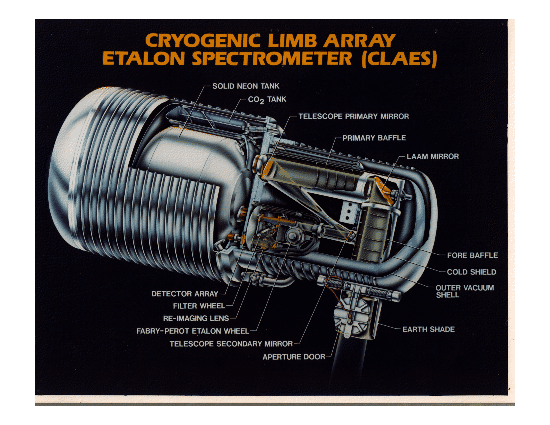
A cutaway view of the CLAES instrument.

CLAES was a spectrometer that determined the concentrations and distributions of nitrogen and chlorine compounds, ozone, water vapor and methane. This platform produced the first global maps of ozone depleting chlorinated compounds. It did this by inferring the amount of gases in the atmosphere by measuring the unique infrared signature of each gas.

In order to differentiate the relatively weak signature of trace gases from the background radiation in the atmosphere, CLAES had to have high resolution and sensitivity. To achieve this, the instrument combined a telescope with an infrared spectrometer. The whole instrument was cryogenically cooled to keep heat from the instrument from interfering with the readings. The cryogenics system consisted of an inner tank of solid neon at −257 °C (−430 °F) and an outer tank of solid carbon dioxide at −150 °C (−238 °F). As the neon and carbon dioxide evaporated, they kept the instrument cool for a planned 19 months. The final cryogens evaporated from the instrument on May 5, 1993, and the instrument warmed up, ending its useful life.

The instrument looked sideways out of the UARS platform to allow the instrument to look through the stratosphere and the lower mesosphere. CLAES produced a 19-month global database showing the vertical distributions of important ozone-layer gases in the stratosphere and their variation with time of day, season, latitude, and longitude.

==== Improved Stratospheric and Mesospheric Sounder (ISAMS) ====
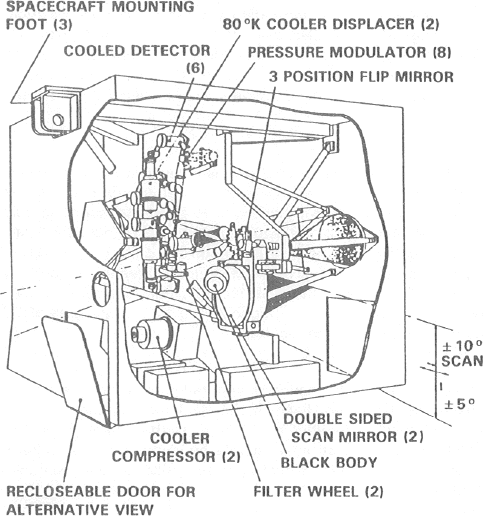
A cutaway view of the ISAMS.

ISAMS is an infrared radiometer for measuring thermal emission from the Earth's limb (the line of the horizon as seen from UARS), on both sides of the spacecraft. It used the pressure-modulation technique to obtain high spectral resolution, and innovative stirling-cycle coolers to achieve high detector sensitivity. ISAMS uses 7 gas cells for 6 different gases: CO_{2} (times 2), CO, CH_{4}, N_{2}O, NO_{2} and H_{2}O. The CO_{2} cells also allow measurement of ozone (O_{3}), nitric acid (HNO_{3}) and dinitrogen pentoxide (N_{2}O_{5})

The specific objectives of ISAMS were: (i) To obtain measurements of atmospheric temperature as a function of pressure, from the tropopause to the mesopause, with good accuracy and spatial resolution, and hence to study the structure and dynamics of the region, (ii) To investigate the distribution and variability of water vapour in the middle atmosphere, to determine its role in the atmospheric general circulation, and its sources and sinks in the middle atmosphere, (iii) To measure the global distribution of oxides of nitrogen and hence to investigate their origins and their roles in catalytic cycles which control the amount of ozone in the stratospheric ozone layer. It also made extensive observations of volcanic aerosols and polar stratospheric clouds in the middle atmosphere. The instrument operated from September 1991–July 1992.

==== Microwave Limb Sounder (MLS) ====
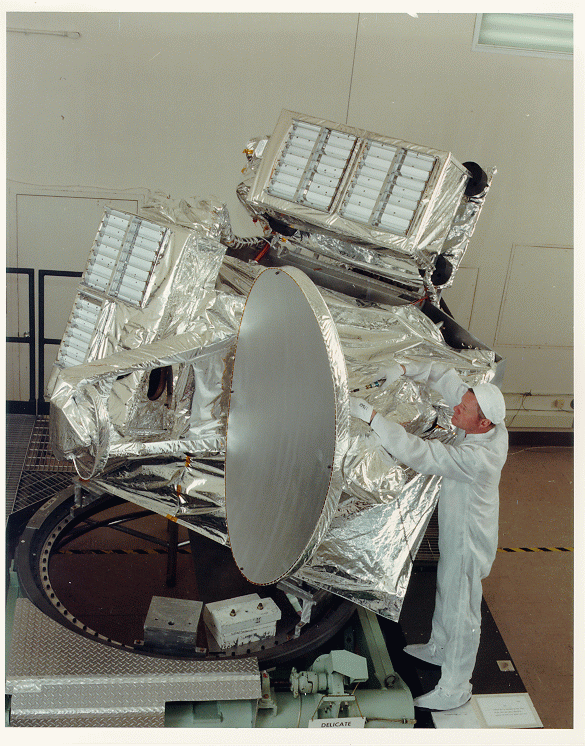
The MLS instrument before installation on the UARS spacecraft.

The MLS detected naturally occurring microwave thermal emissions from Earth's limb to create vertical profiles of atmospheric gases, temperature, pressure and cloud ice. MLS looks 90° from the angle of UARS' orbit.

Thermal radiation enters the instrument through a three-mirror antenna system. The antenna mechanically scans in the vertical plane through the atmospheric limb every 65.5 seconds. The scan covers a height range from the surface up to 90 km (55 miles). Upon entering the instrument, the signal from the antenna is separated into three signals for processing by different radiometers. The 63 GHz radiometer measures temperature and pressure. The 183 GHz radiometer measures water vapor and ozone. The 205 GHz radiometer measures ClO, ozone, sulfur dioxide, nitric acid and water vapor.

As late as June 2005, the 63 and 205 GHz radiometers remained operational, but the 183 GHz radiometer failed after 19 months of operation.

==== Halogen Occultation Experiment (HALOE) ====
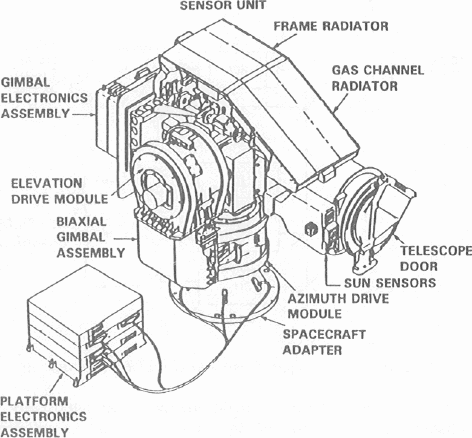
A diagram of the HALOE instrument.

HALOE uses solar occultation to measure simultaneous vertical profiles of ozone (O_{3}), hydrogen chloride (HCl), hydrogen fluoride (HF), methane (CH_{4}), water vapor (H_{2}O), nitric oxide (NO), nitrogen dioxide (NO_{2}), temperature, aerosol extinction, aerosol composition and size distribution versus atmospheric pressure at the Earth's limb. The measurements are done at eight different wavelengths of infrared across a 1.6 km (0.99 mi) wide field of view of Earth's limb.

A vertical scan of the atmosphere was obtained by tracking the sun during occultation. The scan will measure the amount of solar energy absorbed by gases in the atmosphere.

In order to support scanning, the instrument came in two parts, the optics unit on a two-axis gimbal and a fixed electronics unit. The optics unit contains a telescope that collects solar energy as well as the gas detectors. The electronics unit handles data, motor control and power for the instrument.

=== Dynamics ===
==== High Resolution Doppler Imager (HRDI) ====
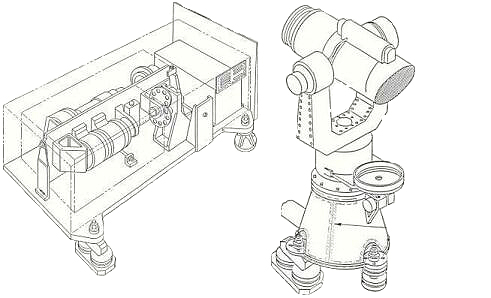
A diagram of the HRDI instrument.

HRDI observed the emission and absorption lines of molecular oxygen above the limb of the Earth, uses the Doppler shift of the lines to determine horizontal winds and uses the line shapes and strengths to obtain information about temperature and atmospheric make-up.

The instrument consists of two parts, the telescope and the interferometer which consists of an optical bench and support electronics.

The telescope used a narrow field of view to prevent Doppler shift variation across the field of view from distorting the results. Input from the telescope is fed to the processor via a fiber optic cable.

HRDI conducted scientific operations from November 1991 until April 2005.

==== Wind Imaging Interferometer (WINDII) ====
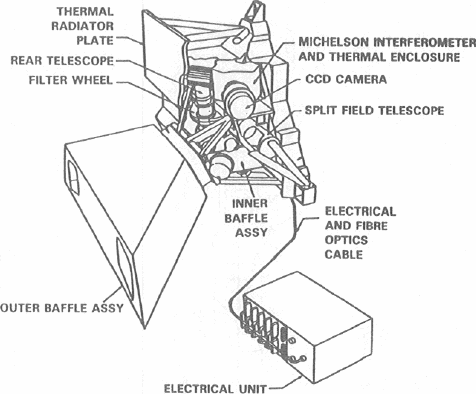
A diagram of the WINDII instrument.

The WINDII instrument measured wind, temperature and emission rate from airglow and aurora. The instrument looked at Earth's limb from two different angles, 45 degrees and 135 degrees off the spacecraft's angle of motion. This allowed the instrument to read the same areas of the sky from two angles within a few minutes of the previous reading.

The instrument consists of an interferometer which feeds to a CCD camera. The two telescopes (45 degrees and 135 degrees) each have a one meter long baffle tube to reduce stray light during daytime viewing. The input from the telescopes is positioned side by side on the CCD so both views are imaged simultaneously.

=== Energy inputs ===
==== Solar Ultraviolet Spectral Irradiance Monitor (SUSIM) ====
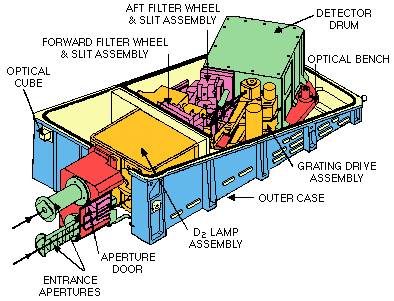
A diagram of the SUSIM instrument.

SUSIM measured ultraviolet (UV) emissions from the sun. The observations are made both through vacuum and through occultations of the sun through the atmosphere. This allowed a comparison of the amount of UV light that reaches the earth and the amount absorbed by the upper atmosphere.

Because of the energy of UV, instrument degradation is a major issue. To help with this problem, the instrument contained two identical spectrometers. One was used almost continuously during the daylight portion of UARS' orbit. The second was used infrequently to verify the sensitivity of the first.

==== Solar Stellar Irradiance Comparison Experiment (SOLSTICE) ====
The Solar Stellar Irradiance Comparison Experiment was designed to measure solar radiation. The instrument used a novel approach to calibration: instead of calibrating against an internal reference lamp, the instrument regularly took measurements of bright blue stars, which have theoretically very stable emissions over intervals on the order of the spacecraft's operational lifetime. The instrument's input slit was configurable for solar or stellar modes, to accommodate for the vast difference in target brightness. In addition to stars, SOLSTICE also took occasional measurements of targets of opportunity, including the Moon and other objects in the Solar System.

==== Active Cavity Radiometer Irradiance Monitor II (ACRIM2) ====
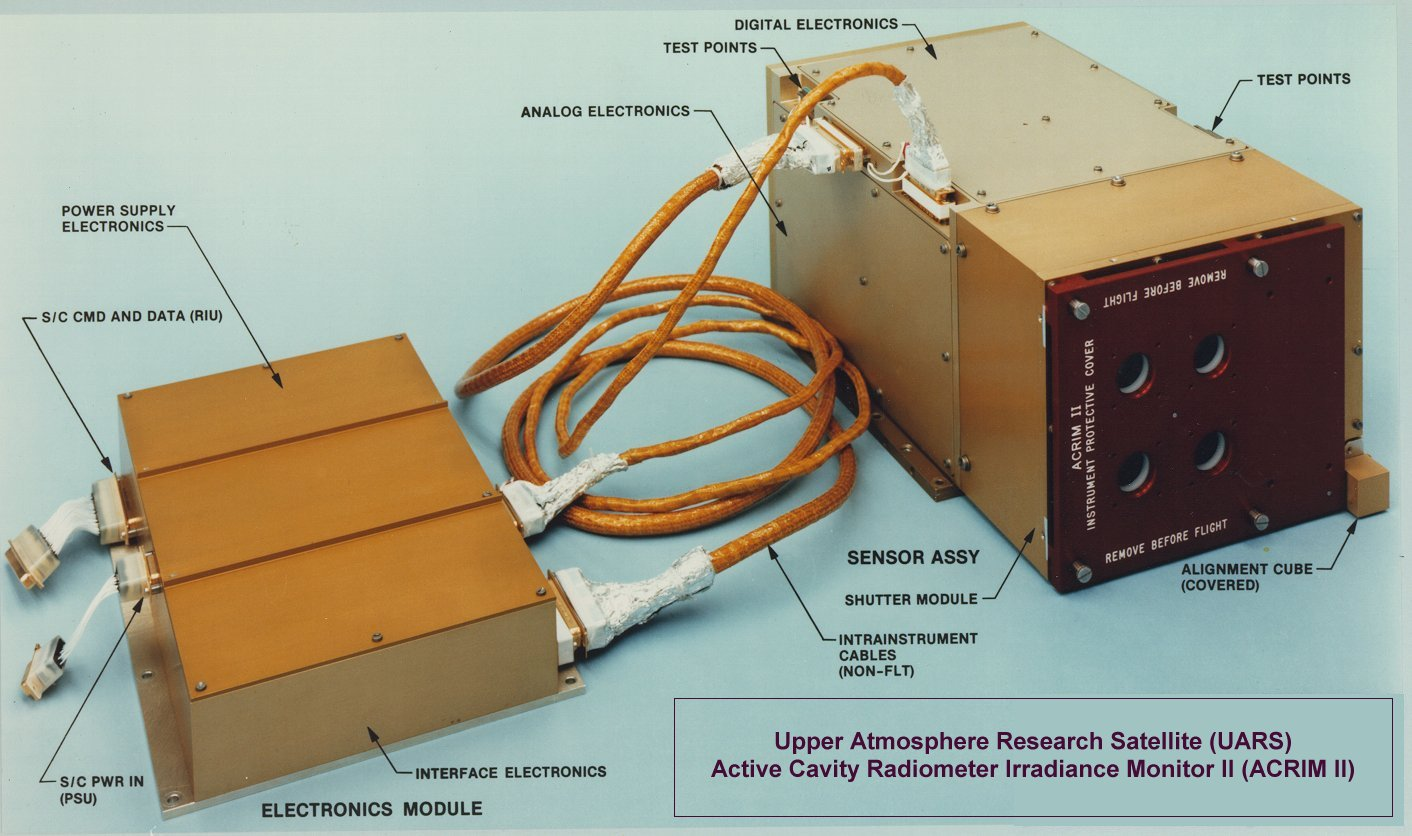
A photo of the UARS/ACRIM2 Total Solar Irradiance monitoring instrument.

The ACRIM2 instrument on the UARS satellite measured the total solar irradiance (TSI), the total solar radiant energy reaching Earth, continuing the climate change database begun in 1980 by the ACRIM1 experiment on the Solar Maximum Mission (SMM). The ACRIM1 experiment's results provided the first discoveries of intrinsic variations in the TSI and their relationships to solar magnetic activity phenomena. ACRIM experiments have confirmed TSI variation occurs on virtually every timescale from their 2-minute observation cadence to the decades-long length of the TSI record to date. A precise knowledge of the TSI and its variation over time is essential to understanding climate change. Recent findings indicate that instrinsic TSI variation has had a much larger role (up to 50%) in global warming during the industrial era than previously predicted by global circulation models (GCM's). The profound sociological and economic implications of understanding the relative climate change contributions of natural and anthropogenic forcings makes it essential that the TSI database, a critical component of climate change research, be carefully sustained into the foreseeable future. The UARS/ACRIM2 experiment was an important part of providing the long term TSI database.

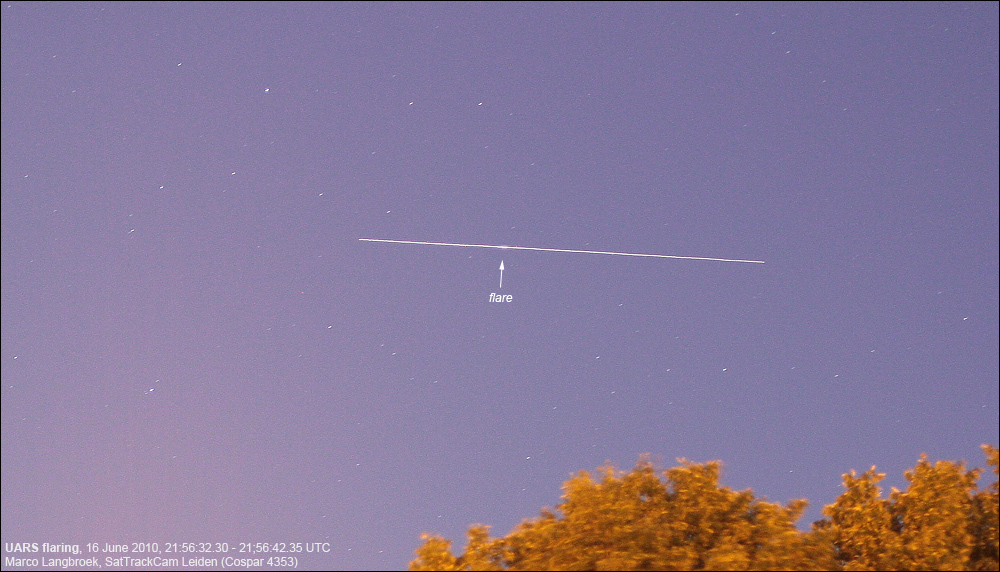
A bright pass of the UARS, photographed from the Netherlands on 16 June 2010.

== End of mission and re-entry ==
=== Orbit-lowering burn ===
UARS was decommissioned on 14 December 2005. The final perigee lowering burns lowered the orbit to 518 km x 381 km. They were followed by the passivation of the satellite's systems.

On 26 October 2010, the International Space Station performed a debris-avoidance maneuver in response to a conjunction with UARS.

=== Re-entry ===
On 7 September 2011, NASA announced the impending uncontrolled re-entry of UARS, and noted that there was a small potential risk to the public. By 23 September 2011, the orbit of UARS had reduced to 175 by 185 km (109 by 115 mi). 26 pieces of debris were expected to survive reentry and strike the surface, the largest of which had an estimated mass of 158.30 kg (348.99 lb), possibly reaching the surface at a velocity of 44 meters per second (140 ft/s) (98 mph; 160 km/h). Smaller pieces were expected to strike the surface at up to 107 metres per second (350 ft/s) (240 mph; 390 km/h).

At 07:46 UTC on 24 September 2011, NASA released an updated statement on the UARS website, stating that: "The Joint Space Operations Center at Vandenberg Air Force Base in California said the satellite penetrated the atmosphere over the Pacific Ocean". A precise re-entry time and location was not initially stated. Nicholas Johnson, the chief orbital debris scientist at NASA's Johnson Space Center, stated that "We don't know where the debris field might be... We may never know." However, the Joint Space Operations Center later announced that the reentry took place at 04:00 UTC on 24 September, at 14.1°S 170.1°W, just downrange of American Samoa. According to NASA, the satellite's debris field would extend between positions 300 and 800 miles (480 and 1,300 km) downrange, generally northeast of this position.
