= Tom Cornell =

American peace activist (1934–2022)

The Reverend Mr. Tom Cornell
- Born: April 11, 1934; Bridgeport, Connecticut
- Died: August 1, 2022 (aged 88); Poughkeepsie, New York
- Education: Fairfield Univ AB 1956; Univ of Bridgeport, MS Sec Ed 1962; Fairfield DLH hc 1990
- Occupations: Peace activist, poverty worker
- Known for: Organizing the first demonstration against the war in Vietnam, July 16, 1963, and the first corporate act of resistance to the Vietnam draft, November 6, 1965, both in New York City.
- Movement: Catholic Worker Movement
- Spouse: Monica
- Children: 2

Thomas C. Cornell (April 11, 1934 – August 1, 2022) was an American journalist and a peace activist against the Vietnam War and the Iraq War. He was an associate editor of the Catholic Worker and a deacon in the Catholic Church.

== Early life and education ==
Cornell was born on April 11, 1934, in Bridgeport, Connecticut. He went to Fairfield University, then Fairfield College. While at Fairfield, he read The Long Loneliness, the autobiography of Dorothy Day, which inspired him to join the Catholic Worker movement.

== Catholic Worker ==
In 1953 when Cornell was 19, he joined the Catholic Worker community in New York, where he served those in need at Maryhouse and St. Joseph House, two Catholic Worker locations in the East Village of Manhattan. He became a writer and editor for the Catholic Worker newspaper. He was the managing editor of the newspaper from 1962 to 1964. Dorothy Day gave him the job just as she was leaving on a trip to Cuba, telling him "You'll figure it out."

== Activism ==
=== The Vietnam War ===
Cornell led the first protest against the Vietnam War, which started with only two people from the Catholic Worker, himself and Chris Kearns, on July 16, 1963, in Union Square in New York City. In ten days their protest grew to 250 and was the first nationally televised Vietnam War protest.

As US military engagement was intensifying in Vietnam, Cornell founded the Catholic Peace Fellowship with Jim Forest in which they worked counseling Catholic conscientious objectors to the Vietnam War, before going on to counsel anyone with draft issues with the aid of Center on Conscience & War, an organization dedicated to defending and extending the rights of conscientious objectors, claiming a "very high" success rate. He also called the first corporate act of resistance to the Vietnam draft, when he and five others, including David McReynolds, burned their draft cards, November 6, 1965, in Union Square, New York City.

In 1967, Cornell signed a public statement declaring his intention to refuse to pay income taxes in protest against the U.S. war against Vietnam. Later, he became a sponsor of the War Tax Resistance project, which practiced and advocated tax refusal as a form of protest against the war.

In 1972, Cornell took part in a meeting which led to the establishment of Pax Christi.

During his years of activism, Cornell was a member of the executive staff of Fellowship of Reconciliation, the executive committee of Pax Christi USA, the War Resisters League, and the Workers' Defense League.

=== The Iraq War ===
He continued in his opposition to the Iraq War, having visited that country before the invasion in December–January 2003 and again after in 2004. His reports were published in The Catholic Worker. He urged that military chaplains be trained in the law regarding conscientious objection and give positive support to claimants.

== Deacon ==
In 1988, Cornell was ordained a deacon in the Archdiocese of Hartford. At the Fourth World Congress in 2000, he served as Pope John Paul II's deacon at a Mass of Christ the King in St. Peter's Square.

== Later life ==
In his retirement, he lived with his wife Monica at the Peter Maurin Farm in Marlboro, New York. He died at the age of 88 on August 1, 2022, at a nearby hospital in Poughkeepsie, New York.

== Works ==
- Cornell, Tom; Ellsberg, Robert; Forest, Jim, eds. (1995). A Penny a Copy: Writings from The Catholic Worker. Maryknoll, NY: Orbis Books.
- Cornell, Tom (September 11, 2005). "A Brief Introduction to the Catholic Worker Movement". Archived from the original on April 2, 2018.
- Cornell, Tom "In Defence of Catholic Worker Anarchism", the May 2010 issue of The Catholic Worker.
- Cornell, Tom (December 22, 2017). "Christian Nonviolence: Theory and Practice". Los Angeles Catholic Worker. Archived from the original on January 27, 2018. Revised from an earlier version in the December 2017 issue of The Catholic Worker

== See also ==
- Christian anarchism
- Dorothy Day
- List of peace activists

== General and cited sources ==
- Cornell, Thomas C.; Forest, James H. (1968). A Penny a Copy: Readings from the Catholic Worker. Macmillan. Revised by the same with Robert Ellsberg, Orbis, 1995
- Finn, James, ed. (1967). Protest: Pacifism and Politics: Some Passionate Views on War and Nonviolence. New York: Random House.
- Ferber, Michael; Lynd, Staughton (1971). The resistance. Beacon Press. ISBN 978-0-8070-0543-9. Archived from the original on August 6, 2022.
- Meconis, Charles A. (1979). With clumsy grace: The American Catholic left, 1961–1975. A Continuum book. Seabury Press. ISBN 9780816491377. Archived from the original on August 6, 2022.
- Miller, William D. (1973). A Harsh and Dreadful Love: Dorothy Day and the Catholic Worker Movement. Doubleday Image book D331. Liveright. ISBN 978-0-87140-558-6. Archived from the original on August 6, 2022.
- Miller, William D. (1982). Dorothy Day: a biography. Harper & Row. ISBN 978-0-06-065752-9. Archived from the original on August 6, 2022.
- Piehl, Mel (1982). Breaking Bread: The Catholic Worker and the Origin of Catholic Radicalism in America. Temple University Press. ISBN 978-0-87722-257-6.
- O'Gorman, Angie (1990). The Universe bends toward justice: a reader on Christian nonviolence in the U.S. New Society Publishers. ISBN 978-0-86571-178-5. Archived from the original on August 6, 2022.
- Ellsberg, R.; Cornell, T. (1998). Dorothi Day: con Dio e con i lavoratori. Un'antologia dei suoi scritti e testimonianze (in Italian). Fossano: Esperienze. ISBN 978-88-8102-063-8.
- Bokenkotter, Thomas S. (1998). Church and Revolution: Catholics in the Struggle of Democracy and Social Justice. Image Doubleday. ISBN 978-0-385-48754-2. Archived from the original on August 6, 2022.
- Zaroulis, N.L.; Sullivan, G. (1985). Who spoke up?: American protest against the war in Vietnam, 1963–1975. Doubleday. ISBN 978-0-385-17547-0.
- Coy, Patrick G. (1988). A Revolution of the Heart: Essays on the Catholic Worker. Temple University Press. ISBN 978-0-87722-531-7. Archived from the original on August 6, 2022.
- Troester, Rosalie Riegle (1993). Voices from the Catholic Worker. Temple University Press. ISBN 978-1-56639-059-0. Archived from the original on August 6, 2022.
- Riegle, Rosalie G. (2003). Dorothy Day: Portraits by Those who Knew Her. Orbis Books. ISBN 978-1-57075-467-8.
- Hand, Stephen (2005). Catholic Voices in a World on Fire. TCR News. ISBN 978-1-4116-5777-9. Archived from the original on August 6, 2022.
- Douglass, James W. (2008). JFK and the Unspeakable: Why He Died and why it Matters. Orbis Books. ISBN 978-1-57075-755-6. Archived from the original on April 16, 2021.
- Zwick, Mark; Zwick, Louise (2005). The Catholic Worker Movement: Intellectual and Spiritual Origins. Paulist Press. ISBN 978-0-8091-4315-3. Archived from the original on August 6, 2022.
- Day, Dorothy (2008). Ellsberg, Robert (ed.). The duty of delight: the diaries of Dorothy Day. Marquette University Press. ISBN 978-0-87462-023-8.
- Day, Dorothy (2010). Ellsberg, Robert (ed.). All the Way to Heaven: The Selected Letters of Dorothy Day. Marquette University Press. ISBN 978-0-87462-061-0.
- Forest, Jim H. (1986). Love is the Measure: A Biography of Dorothy Day. Orbis Books. ISBN 978-0-88344-942-4. Archived from the original on August 6, 2022.
