= Jim Forest =

American peace activist and author (1941–2022)

- Born: November 2, 1941; Salt Lake City, Utah, U.S.
- Died: January 13, 2022 (aged 80); Alkmaar, Netherlands
- Movement: Catholic Worker Movement
- Spouses: Jean Morton (div. 1967); Linda Henry (m. 1967); Nancy Flier (m. c. 1982)
- Awards: Peacemaker, St. Marcellus Award

James Hendrickson Forest (November 2, 1941 – January 13, 2022) was an American writer, Orthodox Christian lay theologian, educator, and peace activist.

== Biography ==
Forest went to high school in Los Angeles, and at age 19 served briefly in the US Navy, working with a meteorology unit at the US Weather Bureau headquarters near Washington, DC. It was during this period that he became a Catholic. His military service ended with an early discharge in 1961 on grounds of conscientious objection.

After leaving the navy, Forest joined the Catholic Worker community in Manhattan, working close with the founder, Dorothy Day, and for a time served as managing editor of the journal she edited, the Catholic Worker.

In 1964, while working as a journalist for the Staten Island Advance, in his spare time he co-founded the Catholic Peace Fellowship, working closely with Tom Cornell. This became a full-time job for both of them in 1965, a time that coincided with deepening US military engagement in Vietnam. The main focus of their work was counseling conscientious objectors.

In 1968, while Forest worked as Vietnam Program Coordinator of the Fellowship of Reconciliation, Jim and thirteen others, mainly Catholic clergy, broke into nine Milwaukee draft boards, removing and burning some of the files in a nearby park while holding a prayer service. Most members of the "Milwaukee Fourteen" served thirteen months in prison for their action.

In the late sixties and mid-seventies, Forest also worked with the Fellowship of Reconciliation, first as Vietnam Program coordinator and later as editor of Fellowship magazine. From 1977 through 1988, he was Secretary General of the International Fellowship of Reconciliation, work which brought him to the Netherlands. He received the Peacemaker Award from Notre Dame University's Institute for International Peace Studies and the St. Marcellus Award from the Catholic Peace Fellowship.

In 1988, Forest was received into the Eastern Orthodox Church. From 1989, he was international secretary of the Orthodox Peace Fellowship as well as associate editor of its quarterly journal, In Communion. In 2017, he was ordained as Reader.

Forest had a long-term friendship with Thomas Merton, who dedicated a book to him, Faith and Violence. Jim also accompanied the famed Vietnamese Buddhist monk, Thich Nhat Hanh.

A journalist and writer, Forest's books include Praying with Icons, Ladder of the Beatitudes, The Road to Emmaus: Pilgrimage as a Way of Life, Loving Our Enemies: Reflections on the Hardest Commandment, Eyes of Compassion: Learning from Thich Nhat Hanh, biographies of Thomas Merton (Living With Wisdom), Dorothy Day (All Is Grace) and Daniel Berrigan (At Play in the Lions' Den), and several children's books, including Saint Nicholas and the Nine Gold Coins, Saint George and the Dragon and Silent as a Stone: Mother Maria of Paris and the Trash Can Rescue. He also wrote a memoir, Writing Straight With Crooked Lines.

The Jim Forest Institute for Religion, Peace & Justice at St. Stephen's University in Canada is named for Forest.

Forest and his wife Nancy, a translator and writer, lived in Alkmaar, the Netherlands. He died there on January 13, 2022, at the age of 80.

== Publications ==
- Forest, Jim (1988). Making Friends of Enemies: Reflections on the Teachings of Jesus. New York, NY: Crossroad. ISBN 0-8245-0885-8.
- Forest, Jim (1997). Praying with Icons. Maryknoll, NY: Orbis. ISBN 157075112-9.
- — (1999). The Ladder of the Beatitudes. Maryknoll, NY: Orbis Books. ISBN 1-57075-245-1.
- — (2002a). The Resurrection of the Church in Albania. World Council of Churches. ISBN 282541359-3.
- — (2002b). Confession: Doorway to Forgiveness. Maryknoll, NY: Orbis. ISBN 157075386-5.
- — (2004). The Wormwood File: E-Mail from Hell. Maryknoll, NY: Orbis Books. ISBN 1-57075-554-X. OCLC 54929440 – via Internet Archive.
- — (2007). Road to Emmaus: Pilgrimage as a Way of Life. Maryknoll, NY: Orbis. ISBN 978-157075731-0.
- — (2008). Living with Wisdom: A Life of Thomas Merton. Maryknoll, NY: Orbis. ISBN 978-157075754-9.
- — (2011). All Is Grace: A Biography of Dorothy Day. Maryknoll, NY: Orbis. ISBN 978-157075921-5.
- — (2014). Loving Our Enemies: Reflections on the Hardest Commandment. Maryknoll, NY: Orbis. ISBN 978-162698090-7.
- — (2017). At Play in the Lion's Den: A Biography and Memoir of Daniel Berrigan. Maryknoll, NY: Orbis. ISBN 978-162698248-2.

Contributions to books by other authors

- — (2003). Introduction. Mother Maria Skobtsova: Essential Writings. By Skobtsova, Maria. Translated by Richard Pevear; Larissa Volokhonsky. Maryknoll, NY: Orbis Books. ISBN 1-57075-436-5. OCLC 49610914 – via Internet Archive.

== See also ==
- List of peace activists

== Sources ==
- Brussat, Frederic; Brussat, Mary Ann. "Review of Living with Wisdom: A Life of Thomas Merton by Jim Forest". Spirituality & Practice.
- Brussat, Frederic; Brussat, Mary Ann. "Jim Forest". Living Spiritual Teachers Project. Spirituality & Practice.
- Cornell, Tom (2008). "The Chaplain's Dilemma: Can Pastors in the Military Serve God and Government?". America. Vol. 199, no. 16. New York. ISSN 0002-7049.
- Di Corpo, Ryan (April 24, 2020). "Review: Jim Forest's new memoir delves into his 'unusual conscience'". America. Vol. 222, no. 9.
- "Forest to Deliver Annual Muste Memorial Lecture". The Anchor. Vol. 101, no. 10. Holland, Michigan: Hope College. 1988. p. 2.
- Forest, Jim (October 14, 2004). "Getting from There to Here". In Communion. Orthodox Peace Fellowship. Archived from the original on September 2, 2009.
- Forest, Jim (2009) [First published 2006]. "Looking Back on the Milwaukee 14". In Communion: Website of the Orthodox Peace Fellowship. Orthodox Peace Fellowship. Archived from the original on August 5, 2009.
- Forest, Jim; Forest, Nancy (2012). "Recollections of Thich Nhat Hanh: Being Peace". Satyagraha Foundation for Nonviolence Studies.
- Merton, Thomas (2011). Shannon, William H. (ed.). The Hidden Ground of Love: Letters. New York: Farrar, Straus and Giroux. ISBN 978-1-4299-6676-4.
- Pauli, Benjamin J. (2017). "The Catholic Worker, Dorothy Day, and Exemplary Anarchism". In Christoyannopoulos, Alexandre; Adams, Matthew S. (eds.). Essays in Anarchism and Religion. Stockholm Studies in Comparative Religion. Vol. 1. Stockholm University Press. p. 33. doi:10.16993/bak. ISBN 978-91-7635-040-9.
- Sooy, Nick. "Remembering Jim Forest". In Communion. Orthodox Peace Fellowship.
- Zuercher, Melanie (2004). "Seeing the Light". PeaceSigns. No. 9. Archived from the original on September 2, 2009.
