= Helen Caldwell Day Riley =

Author and Catholic Worker house founder (1926–2013)

- Born: December 3, 1926
- Died: December 16, 2013 (aged 87)
- Occupations: Author, nurse, hospitality house founder
- Writing career
- Subject: Black Catholic autobiography
- Notable works: Books: Color Ebony (1951); Not Without Tears (1954); All the Way to Heaven (1956); All published by Sheed & Ward

Helen Caldwell Day Riley (1926–2013) was an American nurse, author, and Catholic Worker hospitality house founder. Her three books about race and gender dynamics in the Catholic Church, and African-American Catholic spirituality, all published between 1951 and 1956, were reviewed and discussed nationally.

== Birth and education ==
Born Helen Emmilyne Caldwell in Marshall, Texas, to Velma and George (G. O.) Caldwell. At the time of her birth her mother was a kindergarten teacher, and her father, a violinist and choir director, was a professor of music at Bishop College. The family moved around to his various positions at HBCUs until he settled at Rust College in Holly Springs, Mississippi. The family included her aunt of the same name, an older half-sister from her father's previous marriage, an older brother, and a younger brother. Her father also trained as a pharmacist, so while the family was of modest income they were never destitute. Of the money situation, Catholic Worker newspaper editor Amanda Daloisio, writing for The Black Catholic Messenger, said, "[G. O.] believed that his gifts and talents as a musician and as a professor should be of service to the southern Black community, despite never being paid much more than a laborer’s salary." Her parents divorced and remarried.

A Memphis paper claimed Day Riley was from Memphis, but the city only had a partial claim on her given how much the family moved around. She said they lived in Missouri, Iowa, Mississippi, and Tennessee. She began grade school in Iowa City, Iowa and recalled that she did not experience racial discrimination there. She loved the public library and began to use it and check out books when she was six. It came as a traumatic shock when the family moved to Mississippi, and she encountered more racially charged schools in the heavily segregated deep south. She started college early, at age 16, attending Rust College, the HBCU where her father taught music. In 1944 she enrolled in its military cadet nurse corps program that was still operating toward the end of WWII. In February 1945 she entered the nursing training program at Harlem Hospital in New York.

Tuberculosis interrupted her studies during her senior year, and she was a patient at the former Cumberland Hospital, around the same time her son Butch was diagnosed with polio. She wrote her first autobiography during 19 months in two tuberculosis sanatoriums, first in Memphis and then at Stony Wold, New York. She was able to work as a nurse after her recovery, but only as a practical nurse (RPN), since illness had interrupted her RN training.

== Conversion to Catholicism ==
When she was a student nurse, she encountered the Catholic faith when she was trained to baptize dead and dying babies born to Catholic parents. During a time when she was briefly hospitalized with tonsillitis, a hospital chaplain, Fr. Francis Meenan, asked if she wanted to become Catholic, and she said yes. After the birth of her son, whom she left with her mother while she finished school, she moved back to New York and volunteered at the Mott Street house of hospitality, sponsored by Servant of God Dorothy Day and Peter Maurin via the Catholic Worker. She sang, and was part of a group of young people whom Dorothy Day wrote of in The Catholic Worker, saying they formed a lay apostolate and "managed to have a grand time."

== Hospitality house founder ==
In 1951 a fire in Memphis took the lives of two Black children whose mother had left them home alone so she could go to work. The tragedy, and the need for childcare for working mothers, led Day Riley to open Blessed Martin's House of Hospitality on January 6, 1952 (the feast of the Epiphany) a storefront at 299 S. 4th Street, in the tradition of Catholic Worker houses. It was named for now-Saint Martin de Porres, and the nursery was named in full for the saint. Dorothy Day attended the opening, breaking segregation laws by staying at the house itself. It was intended to provide shelter for the poor, particularly women and their children. Day Riley received anonymous letters challenging her authority, but Father John J. Coyne S.S.J. of the Josephites, a congregation organized specifically to work for racial equality, supported her and rallied the group around her. He blessed it with holy water at the opening when Dorothy Day was present, and he became the spiritual director of the house. In 1950 Day Riley got approval for the house from Bishop William Adrian, and he also gave her startup funds. She opened the house on January 6, 1952, in a run-down store property near Beale Street. She soon had 15-16 children whom the group cared for while their mothers worked. Dorothy Day helped them purchase a house in 1954, and Day printed a fundraising appeal in The Catholic Worker. Although Bishop Adrian initially did approve the house, he also became one of many white voices asking her to be less political and not try to go so quickly or be so outspoken. The house had a clothing room, a library, and it offered sewing lessons. A woman who lived across the street came in to help every day.

The house was supported by an interracial Catholic Action study and discussion group called The Blessed Martin House Outer Circle. Day Riley co-founded it with a white man from a well-off family in Memphis who arranged to meet her at Riverside Park in 1950 to discuss the group's formation. The police broke up the meeting because the park was for whites only.

== Author of articles and books ==
While recuperating from another bout of tuberculosis in Memphis, Day Riley contributed an occasional column called "Looking Things Over" to the Memphis World, an African-American newspaper. A letter she wrote to friends about being turned away from the segregated Holly Springs church where she used to worship was published in The Catholic Worker, bringing her to the attention of Catholics who began an interracial study group with her in Memphis. Publisher Maisie Ward wrote about Day Riley's three books for her publishing house, Sheed & Ward, in her autobiography Unfinished Business. "How profound is Helen Day’s prayer about the problems of being a negro in the deep South. 'Not just a plain old wooden cross,' she prays – Yes, she will carry a cross, but it must be more clearly a cross, heavier perhaps, certainly of her own choosing. 'I’ll send you a specification' she hears herself saying to God." From 1963 to 1970 Day Riley was listed on the masthead of The Catholic Worker as one of its editors. She went on speaking engagements to support her books throughout the country, as much as she was able to with her many duties.

=== Book: Color, Ebony (Sheed & Ward, 1951) ===
The reception of Day Riley's first book was positive, and her second and third gradually drew more acclaim. Color, Ebony was serialized in the Biloxi, Mississippi Sun Herald before publication. The New York Times noted its appearance. Daniel Cantwell of the Catholic Labor Alliance in Chicago reviewed it for The American Catholic Sociological Review, writing that it "will help white Catholics know their fellow Catholics of color, their human problems, their human yearnings, their heartaches, their hurt feelings, their problems of Faith, their spiritual depth, [it] is an important book. Helen Day in telling the story of her life as she looks back upon it at the age of twenty-three from a bed in a New York tuberculosis sanatorium does all this - and does it superbly well." Writing for The Catholic Worker, Jack English saod that it "is a simply written book, one which is full of hope of what can be accomplished through the Christian techniques inherent in the doctrine of the Mystical Body of Christ. It is a mature book, surprising in one so young, and it is a book which could only be written by a generous person who has been peculiarly formed and blessed by the Holy Spirit. For a deep and penetrating analysis of what it is to be a Negro in this country, Color, Ebony is to be recommended." The Commercial Appeal (Memphis, Tennessee) called it "both refreshing and important." In The Tidings, the official archdiocesan newspaper for Los Angeles, John S. Kennedy wrote, "you will probably agree it is one of the most engrossing and inspiring life stories you have ever taken up," and "an altogether exceptional work, this must be on your reading list for the fall and winter." He later added it to his recommended list of Christmas books, calling it "heart-breaking and heart-lifting." Norman Cousins ran excerpts in his periodical, The Saturday Review of Literature. Alma Savage, the children's page editor for Our Sunday Visitor, met the author, writing that she "is as inspiring to meet as the book is to read." Virginia Beck Smith later called Day Riley "A really brilliant writer" in the same publication. Charles Alexander in the Albany Democrat-Herald called it "a moving autobiography that rates among the most engrossing life-stories of recent times" and "an altogether exceptional work."

Day Riley also received some mild editorial pushback for the book from three Southern newspapers. The News & Observer (Raleigh, North Carolina) had the most negative reaction, calling it "A bill of complaint." The Durham Herald-Sun (North Carolina) said crypitcally that Color, Ebony is "not intended to inflame, but to light a darkened pathway." The Tampa Tribune only gleaned from it that "white people are not all bad."

=== Book: Not Without Tears (Sheed & Ward, 1954) ===
Day Riley's second book was reviewed in nine Catholic journals, more than its predecessor, demonstrating the growth of the author's impact. John E. Coogan, S. J., reviewing for The American Catholic Sociological Review, wrote, "What does a Negro mother say when hospital Sisters of her own faith close their doors against her polio-crippled child needing an operation? What when her canon-law pastor tells her his is a White church – that he would not answer her summons even to give her the Last Sacraments?... Helen Day here shows us how to become a saint and love it. Her story of meeting Christ in a Memphis alley brings no scent of magnolias, but there's deep laughter in her eyes." Writing this time for Our Sunday Visitor, John S. Kennedy said, "The further journey is even more interesting, and the new book even better." The Chattanooga Daily Times wrote that "She has written it with a fine restraint, with intelligence, kindness, and humor."

=== Book: All the Way to Heaven (Sheed & Ward, 1956) ===
Her third book was based on the Catholic Anointing of the Sick. The Catholic Standard and Times ran a positive review, concluding, "May this book be read widely." Virginia Rohr Rowland, affiliated with Friendship House and a contributor to America magazine, reviewed it positively on the radio. The St. Louis Register wrote in a notice (not yet a review), "This is a wonderful, moving book. The sick will receive comfort and inspiration from it, and undoubtedly a generous acceptance of trials, which can crush the hardiest soul." A later full review, however, praised it but labeled it "overly sentimental." A. K. C. writing for The Catholic Worker raved, "Helen Day does not lower her ideals when the going gets rough, or talk in terms of a modified spirituality more 'suited' to work in the world. Her courage is admirable, her example inspiring."

== Personal life ==
Circa 1946 Day Riley (then Caldwell) met a Navy sailor named George Day, with whom she shared what she called "a grand passion," and they were secretly married before she became pregnant. Her husband was arrested by the Navy for desertion, and she obtained a divorce before their son, MacDonald Francis Day (always known as Butch), was born. The Associated Negro Press included a photo of her and Butch in some newspapers. Butch had polio while she was recovering from tuberculosis, and they experienced health disparities when he was denied admission to three hospitals before they found one that would take a Black child. He also suffered an eye injury and developed glaucoma when yet another hospital would not take him in time. Day Riley's mother raised her son while she finished nursing school.

In 1955 she married a man from the hospitality house community, Jesse Richardson Riley, whom she noted was a fervent Catholic like her. The couple tried to keep the Blessed Martin House open, but they were forced to close it for financial reasons in 1957, after which they moved to Barstow, California, and they had four children together. They were married for 58 years, and Day Riley worked as the children's librarian at the public library in Barstow. Although she was no longer an activist, she remained involved in volunteer work, and in 1986 she and her husband hosted members of the Great Peace March for Global Nuclear Disarmament. She continued to practice her Catholic faith, and she and her husband were lifelong members of the Knights of Columbus.

She died December 16, 2013, in Barstow, California.
