= Entertaining Angels: The Dorothy Day Story =

- Directed by: Michael Ray Rhodes
- Written by: John Wells
- Starring: Moira Kelly; Heather Graham; Lenny Von Dohlen; Martin Sheen
- Distributed by: Paulist Pictures
- Release date: September 27, 1996
- Country: United States
- Language: English

Entertaining Angels: The Dorothy Day Story is a 1996 American independent film about the life of Dorothy Day, the journalist turned social activist and founder of the Catholic Worker newspaper. The film stars Moira Kelly as Day, Heather Graham, Lenny Von Dohlen and Martin Sheen.

Writer John Wells and actors Kelly and Sheen also collaborated in the NBC dramatic series The West Wing. Kelly, Graham, and Von Dohlen previously appeared in David Lynch's Twin Peaks: Fire Walk with Me.

== Cast ==
- Moira Kelly as Dorothy Day
- Martin Sheen as Peter Maurin
- Lenny Von Dohlen as Forster Batterham
- Melinda Dillon as Sister Aloysius
- Paul Lieber as Mike Gold
- Heather Graham as Maggie Bowen
- Boyd Kestner as Lionel Moise
- James Lancaster as Eugene O'Neill
- Geoffrey Blake as Floyd Dell
- Tracey Walter as Joe Bennett
- Brian Keith as Cardinal
- Thom Adcox-Hernandez as Dan Irwin
- Allyce Beasley as Frankie
- Val Bettin as Mr. Breen
- Marianne Muellerleile as Landlady
- Renée Estevez as Lilly Batterham
- Redmond Gleeson as Irish Man

== Reception ==
On Rotten Tomatoes, it has a 50% approval rating based on 6 reviews, with an average score of 5.7/10.
