= Spanish Camp =

Community in New York City

- Community
- Nickname: Spanish Colony
- Location within New York City
- Coordinates: 40.5243°N 74.1708°W
- Country: United States
- State: New York
- City: New York City
- Borough: Staten Island
- Established: 1929
- Founder: Spanish Naturopath Society

Area
  - Total: 18 acres (7.3 ha)
- Time zone: UTC-5 (Eastern (EST))
  - Summer (DST): UTC-4 (EDT)
- Demolished, 2001 (Dorothy Day Cottages) and April 2026 (remaining structures)

Spanish Camp, also known as Spanish Colony, was a private cooperative community on the shore of Staten Island, one of the five boroughs of New York City. It existed from the 1920s to the first decade of the 21st century, when it was demolished.

== History ==
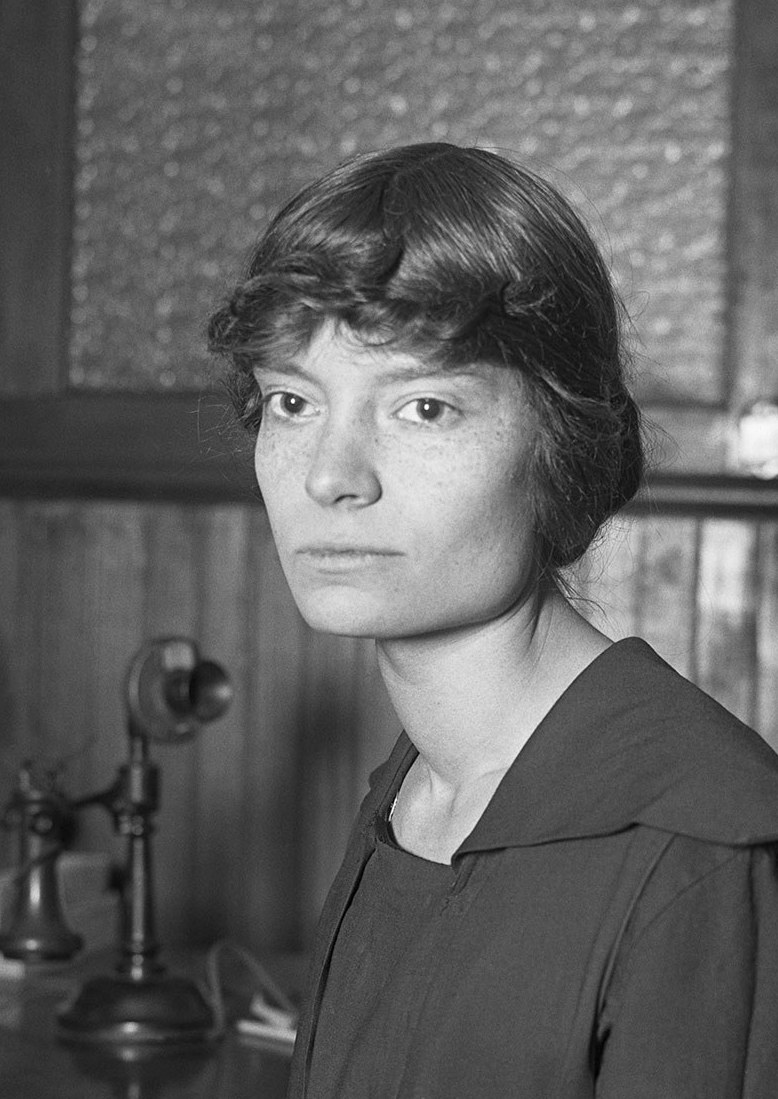
Dorothy Day in 1916

In 1924, Dorothy Day, then a journalist and socialist active in New York's bohemian circles, moved to a cottage near the area that would later become Spanish Camp. Her time there played a role in her religious conversion to Catholicism, despite criticism from her peers who viewed religion as incompatible with socialist ideals. Five years later, in 1929, the Spanish Camp was established by the Spanish Naturopath Society as a summer retreat for Spanish immigrants living in New York City. Many of these people were Anarchists who had left Spain. The 18-acre (73,000 m^{2}) property was located facing lower New York Bay on the southeastern shore of Staten Island, off Poillon Avenue near the neighborhood of Annadale. The group of cottages had its own streets and services, independent of anything having to do with the rest of Staten Island and New York City. A small pond and associated wetlands were included. A small beach faced the bay, adjacent to an ornate picnic area and athletic field. Initially, the settlement featured canvas tents surrounding a communal space with a meeting hall, kitchen, latrines, and showers. The camp fostered a communal and naturalistic lifestyle, with frequent gatherings that included musical performances, flamenco exhibitions, and Labor Day festivals.

By 1933, following her conversion, Dorothy Day had returned to Manhattan and, alongside Peter Maurin, founded the Catholic Worker Movement. The organization advocated for social justice and aid to the poor through shelters, food distribution, and a newspaper based on Catholic social teaching. During the 1940s, temporary dwellings at Spanish Camp gradually evolved into permanent bungalows as residents began to live there year-round. The site became a long-standing home to Spanish immigrant workers and their descendants. In 1945 or 1948, the Spanish Naturopath Society formally purchased the land for $35,000. While individual members could buy cottages, the land remained under collective ownership.

By 1972, Dorothy Day returned to the Staten Island waterfront, seeking solitude and reflection in her later years. The Catholic Worker Movement purchased three cottages from the Spanish Naturopath Society, and Day lived in one of them until her death. In 1975, the New York City Parks Department designated part of the Spanish Camp property as open space to protect its wetlands. When Dorothy Day died in 1980 at the age of 83, the cottage she had lived in became a pilgrimage site for some within the Catholic community. Tours and discussions about her legacy took place in the following years. By 1986, most members of the Spanish Naturopath Society had moved away. Only 12 members were still residents, while other residents controlled only the home itself.

=== Demise ===
In 1997, developer John DiScala acquired the land, including the Catholic Worker cottages, from descendants of the original owners. Residents of the 70 existing cottages received eviction notices, and DiScala proposed building 37 new beachfront homes. Residents filed a lawsuit, arguing that their property was being taken unfairly, but they lost the case. Preservationists began advocating for the protection of the site, with Channel Graham of the Preservation League of Staten Island submitting a Request for Evaluation to the New York City Landmarks Preservation Commission (LPC). In the late 1990s, the not-for-profit Friends of the Dorothy Day Cottages was established. DiScala agreed in principle to preserve a few structures and donate part of the property to the city and the preservation group, but these agreements were non-binding. In January 2000, LPC Chair Jennifer Raab alerted the Staten Island Buildings Department that cottages were pending landmark designation, though no official calendaring had occurred. Despite preservation efforts, several buildings were demolished without permits.

A meeting on February 8, 2001, between LPC counsel and the developer's lawyers made it clear that demolition was imminent. On February 9, 2001, the Dorothy Day Cottages were demolished. An investigation later revealed that the demolition permit had been forged. The developer paid a $2,500 fine, and the company declared bankruptcy shortly thereafter. Between 2001 and 2015, preservationists continued lobbying for a Spanish Camp Historic District. Proposals included the Dorothy Day cottage site, a coastal lane, and a pond. The LPC placed the proposal on its backlog of pending cases.

On October 22, 2015, the LPC held a hearing to consider the building for city landmark status. The agency ultimately removed the site from its calendar, citing lack of merit due to the absence of remaining structures. Samir Lazoja bought the remaining structures on the site in May 2025 and demolished them in April 2026. At the time, the owners had been fined a cumulative $7,622 due to the poor condition of the property.

== Legacy ==
In 2007, Wagner College hosted a panel titled "Spanish Camp: Place Matters," and the Staten Island History Museum presented the exhibit "This Was Our Paradise: Spanish Camp, 1929 to Today," which included photographs, oral histories, and a visual timeline.

Today, the former Spanish Camp site remains undeveloped and overgrown. It was never designated a city landmark. The site is remembered for its cultural, rather than architectural, significance.
