= Dorothy Day homeless shelter =

Homeless shelter campus in Minnesota, US

Coordinates: 44°56′51″N 93°6′10″W

Dorothy Day Shelter
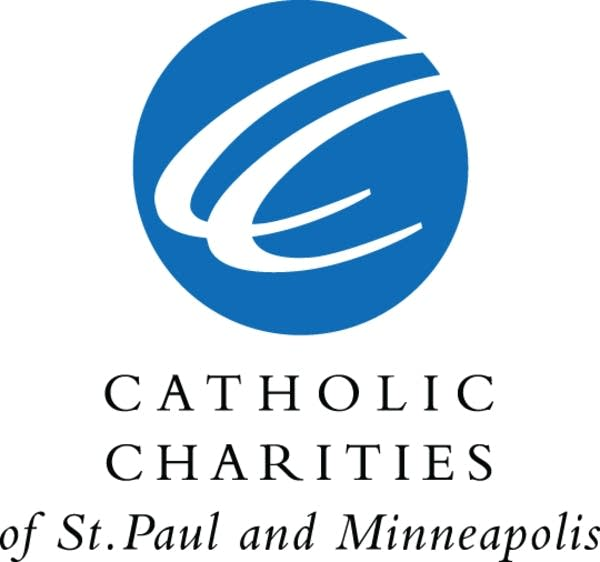

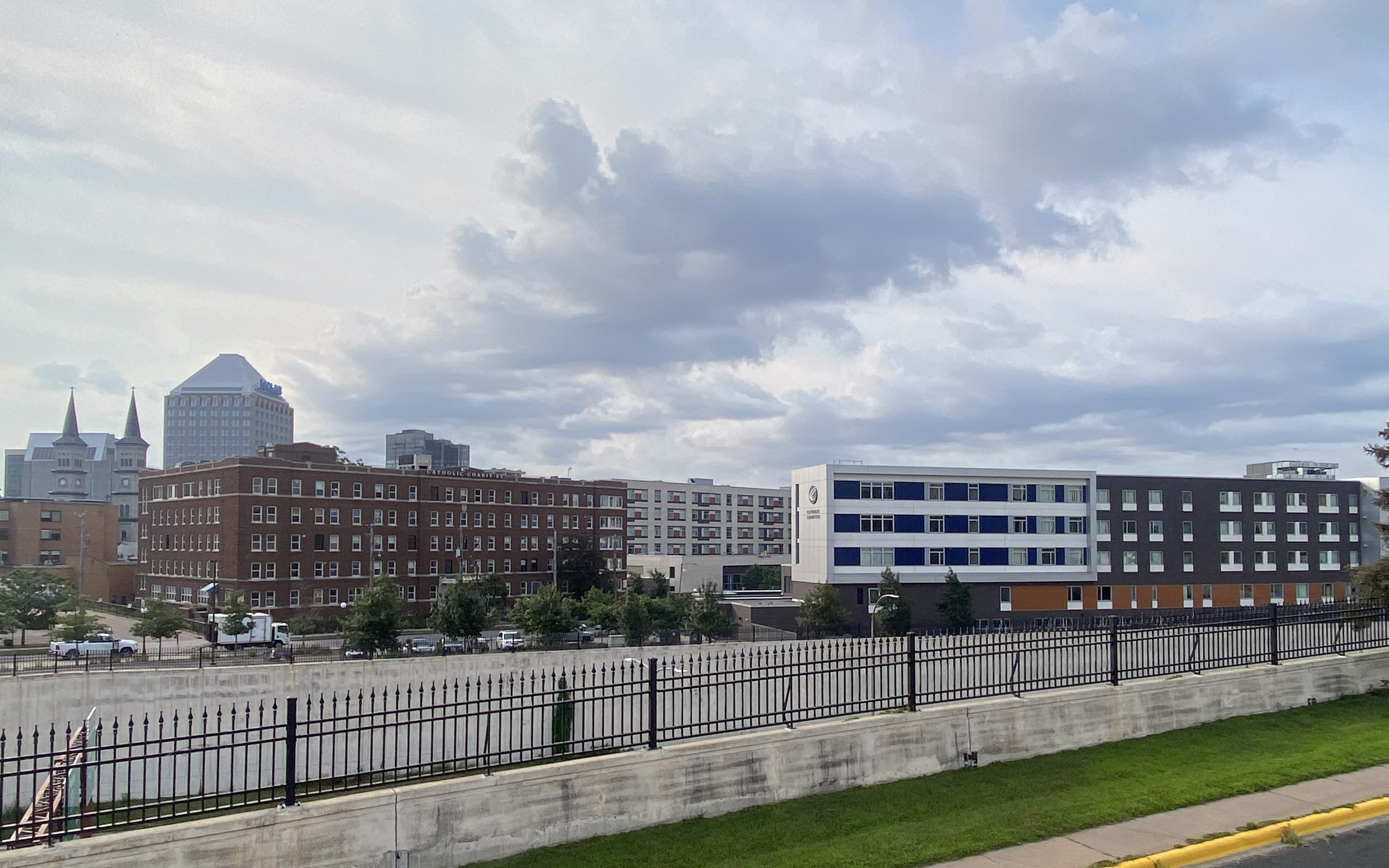
- Named after: Dorothy Day
- Formation: 1981; 45 years ago

The Dorothy Day shelter is a homeless shelter campus in Saint Paul, Minnesota, United States. The project is centered around the site of the Dorothy Day Center built in downtown Saint Paul in 1981. The shelter is named after American Catholic and social activist Dorothy Day. The Dorothy Day Center started as a drop-in center for meals to help the homeless population in downtown Saint Paul. The facility is operated by Catholic Charities of St. Paul and Minneapolis in coordination with Ramsey County, Minnesota.

The new Higher Ground St. Paul facility was planned to provide around twice as much space as the Dorothy Day Center. Construction on the Higher Ground St. Paul housing program began in 2015 and was opened in January 2017 located next to the Dorothy Day Center site. The Higher Ground facility serves the downtown Saint Paul homeless population by providing emergency shelter as well as more permanent housing.

The original Dorothy Day Center was demolished in September 2017. The new Saint Paul Opportunity Center and Dorothy Day Residence facility under construction on the previous Dorothy Day Center location is expected to be completed by July 2019. The Dorothy Day Center provided approximately eight million meals to the community during the duration of its operations over 36 years.

== History ==
The original Dorothy Day Center was built in 1981. In 1989, the center received a funding grant of $2.97 million from the Department of Housing and Urban Development to build 75 federally subsidized rooms at the Mary Hall building nearby. The funding would pay for the restoration of two floors in the building as well as for use by Catholic Charities for rental assistance. The Mary Hall building also provides a 25-person emergency shelter. The Mary Hall building is located near the St. Joseph's Hospital.

During planning meetings for the new expansion in 2013, former Saint Paul Mayor Chris Coleman announced a "reVision" expansion campaign. During the discussion, the new center expansion faced notable opposition during planning to relocate away from the Saint Paul downtown.

The project cost for building the Higher Ground facility ($40 million) as well as replacing the Dorothy Day Center has a total cost of $100 million and will be completed in July 2019. The funding was provided by private donations as well as state, city, and county and city funds. The state of Minnesota and Ramsey County and other public sources have provided $25 million in funding for the project. Private funding provided $40 million of the project budget in donations from more than 480 individuals and institutions. Additional bonds and public funding are expected to cover the remainder of the $100 million budget. Annual operating costs after project completion are expected to increase from $2.2 million currently to $2.8 million per year.

The project for the Higher Ground facility started with a $5 million donation by The Richard M. Schulze Family Foundation. Other donors that donated greater than $1 million include Target Corp., U.S. Bank Foundation, Ecolab Foundation, 3M Co., Hardenbergh Foundation, Premier Banks, Frey Foundation, Carl and Eloise Pohlad Family Foundation and the Julie and Doug Baker Jr. Foundation.

As of 2014, Catholic Charities operated around 85 percent of the drop-in homeless services and around 80 percent of the adult single overnight shelter beds in Ramsey County. In 2011, poverty rates in the city of Saint Paul had reached 23.9 percent.

In 2017, the city of Saint Paul created a program "Redirecting Users of Shelter to Housing (RUSH)" in collaboration with the county and Catholic Charities to target the 100 most frequent users of shelter services and to put them into more permanent housing. The program is modeled after a similar program called "Top 51" started by Hennepin County, Minnesota, in the year 2012. The program saw a reduction by 76 percent in emergency room and a 41 percent decline in ambulance calls for the individuals during the year they were in housing, while arrests dropped by 43 percent.

== Dorothy Day Center ==
The original Dorothy Day Center was not designed for emergency shelter for sleeping, and mainly provided blue mats for sleeping on the floor with men and women's spaces in the main sleeping room divided by a line of folding chairs. The site frequently allowed up to 250 homeless people a night although the site was constructed for a 50-person capacity. The building was two-stories high.

== Higher Ground Minneapolis ==
The facility is modeled and influenced by the Higher Ground facility in Minneapolis which opened in 2012. The Minneapolis building is operated by Catholic Charities of St. Paul and Minneapolis and is located near the Minneapolis Farmers’ Market. The Minneapolis facility is seven-stories high located on Glenwood Avenue in Minneapolis, Minnesota. The facility is two-thirds the size of the Saint Paul Facility.

== Higher Ground St. Paul ==
The building is five stories tall and is located across the street near the Grand Casino Arena in Saint Paul. The facility currently provides 172 beds for men and 60 beds for women. The Higher Ground center offers a "Pay-for-Stay" model for housing homeless persons and offers bunk beds, showers, lockers, and electrical outlets for either $7 per night or $42 per week. The Higher Ground building additionally provides 193 new permanent housing units. The rooms are set up similar to dorm rooms. Residents share bathrooms, lounges and kitchens and case workers are available on each floor. Residents also have access to laundry services. The building is 111,261 square feet.

The Saint Paul architect firm Cermak Rhoades Architects designed both of the buildings. The building design features an L-shaped exterior. The first floor features an intake office and shelter check-in where staff can conduct Breathalyzer tests and bag checks. The floor also features 12 rooms for late-stage alcoholic women to live in. The second floor features 48 "Pay-for-Stay" beds. The second floor also features two computer rooms. Money paid for "Pay-for-Stay" beds is saved for each client to use as a security deposit or for a first month's rent whenever an individual can find permanent housing (up to $500). Of the residents staying in "Pay-for-Stay" beds, more than half are employed.

Three local Saint Paul hospitals have worked together to create and service a 16-bed medical respite unit located on the second floor of the Higher Ground facility to help homeless individuals recover after treatment from the local hospitals. The respite unit has nurses on staff to assist patients, as well as mental health and community health professionals. Staff at the site can also help homeless individuals connect with housing advocates. As a result of a similar project in Minneapolis, officials determined a 67 percent reduction in re-hospitalization and over 50 percent reduction in emergency room visits.

The third, fourth, and fifth floors provide permanent supportive housing. These apartments are restrictive in that residents cannot have alcohol and that guests can be restricted.

== Saint Paul Opportunity Center and Dorothy Day Residence ==
The Saint Paul Opportunity Center is Phase II of the Dorothy Day Place project. The new Opportunity Center is expected to provide meals to the homeless, as well as career services and other programs. The new center's upper floors will provide an additional 177 units of housing with preference given to homeless veterans. The new building will be 50,000 square-feet and connected to the Higher Ground Saint Paul building by skyway.

Rents in the new building are expected to be between $275 and $475 per month or 30 percent of the renter's income. The new building will feature a medical clinic on-site. During construction of the facility, some of the services will be shifted to Catholic Charities' Mary Hall building nearby.
