= The Long Loneliness =

1952 book by Dorothy Day

- Author: Dorothy Day
- Cover artist: Fritz Eichenberg
- Language: English
- Genre: Autobiography
- Publisher: Harper & Brothers
- Publication date: 1952

The Long Loneliness is the autobiography of Dorothy Day, published in 1952 by Harper & Brothers. In the book, Day chronicles her involvement in socialist groups along with her eventual conversion to Catholicism in 1927, and the beginning of her newspaper the Catholic Worker in 1933.

It has been characterized as "a remarkably candid account, without piety, of her journey to faith". A 1952 review in The New York Times focused on her interactions with communism and her journey away from it while staying true to her radical roots: "This book will not shock anybody. It may touch many, whatever their secular or religious faith, who lament the kindliness and sympathy that Communists found among certain left-wing groups -- and betrayed."
