= Catholic Charities of the Archdiocese of Chicago =

Catholic Charities of the Archdiocese of Chicago is the largest in a nationwide network of faith-based social service providers that form Catholic Charities. Together they form the largest private network of social service providers in the United States. More than 1,400 agencies, institutions, and organizations make up the Catholic Charities network, which provides services to nearly 10 million people in need each year regardless of religious, social, or economic backgrounds. The network also seeks to advocate for issues of importance to those in need.

== History ==
Catholic Charities of the Archdiocese of Chicago began in 1917, when a group of Catholic businessmen petitioned Cardinal Mundelein to create a Catholic charity to centralize resources in order to relieve the burden of Catholic parishes that were struggling to meet the needs of the poor in their communities. Their vision was a central fundraising mechanism for archdiocesan charities, which would solicit donations and distribute funds. The organization was chartered in January 1918, and Cardinal Mundelein addressed its 200 board members at its first annual meeting in April of the following year, reporting on the success of the agency in serving the poor:

"During the past 12 months, 50,000 people in this city and diocese have contributed their money, their time and their services that we might efficiently carry out these works of mercy, that we might feed the hungry, nurse the sick, protect the orphan, shelter the homeless and help the poor in our midst."

== Early services provided ==
During the Depression, the agency fed the hungry and cared for orphans and children of unwed mothers as well as the mothers. The former administrative building at 126 North Desplaines Street was not only a residence for priests, but also a shelter for homeless men. Suppers for the hungry and homeless were served out of 721 North LaSalle, now Catholic Charities' St. Vincent Center, the other main administrative building and then the site of St. Vincent's Hospital and Orphanage.

By 1945, Catholic Charities oversaw 48 different aid programs. {http://www.catholiccharities.net/AboutUs/OurHistory.aspx} This included:

- job training
- maternity care for unwed mothers
- day care
- care for the aged and the sick
- emergency food and shelter
- counseling.

== Services today ==
Over several decades, the agency has opened offices and established community service centers in neighborhoods with high poverty rates, enabling it to serve the members of the communities directly. The broad range of social services provided addresses immediate basic human needs, as well as long-term social and economic needs, in order to promote economic and emotional self-sufficiency.

Catholic Charities of the Archdiocese of Chicago functions today as one of the largest private non-profit social service agencies in the Midwest, and also one of the largest Catholic Charities of any diocese or archdiocese in the country.

== Staff and volunteers ==
In the beginning, nearly all the work of Catholic Charities was accomplished by volunteers. To this day, volunteers are extremely critical to the work of Catholic Charities. Approximately 15,000 volunteers provided invaluable assistance to Catholic Charities last year. Catholic Charities also employs nearly 2,500 individuals as social workers, aides, administrators and program directors.

== International collaboration ==
In 1999, they came to an agreement with Caritas of the Archdiocese of Mexico City, this was in response to a call by the Pope to increase the reach of the organization. This was one of the first times Catholic Charities of Chicago had extended itself internationally and into another culture.

The agreement entailed both agencies to collaborate in their services to Mexican immigrants, seniors in both countries, and to promote understanding between staffs. It also allowed for Mexican children ready for adoption to enter America, as well as bringing Mexican government officials to discuss opportunities for them in the U.S.

They have also worked with Catholic Charities of the Diocese of Bucharest in Romania, when they sought advice and counsel on construction of a new medical facility.

== Local presence ==
Catholic Charities develops its presence in communities across the Archdiocese of Chicago wherever needs dictate. They open homeless shelters in communities that are experiencing homelessness for the first time, and add Spanish speaking staff in neighborhoods that are becoming predominantly Hispanic. As differing factors change, so do they change in the depth and breadth of their response.
