= Fritz Eichenberg =

German-American illustrator and arts educator (1901–1990)

- Born: 24 October 1901; Cologne, Germany
- Died: 30 November 1990 (aged 89); Peace Dale, Rhode Island, US
- Known for: Illustration, wood engraving

Fritz Eichenberg (October 24, 1901 – November 30, 1990) was a German-American illustrator and arts educator who worked primarily in wood engraving. His best-known works were concerned with religion, social justice and nonviolence.

== Biography ==
Eichenberg was born to a Jewish family in Cologne, Germany, where the destruction of World War I helped to shape his anti-war sentiments. He worked as a printer's apprentice, and studied at the Municipal School of Applied Arts in Cologne and the Academy of Graphic Arts in Leipzig, where he studied under de:Hugo Steiner-Prag. In 1923, he moved to Berlin to begin his career as an artist, producing illustrations for books and newspapers. In his newspaper and magazine work, Eichenberg was politically outspoken and sometimes both wrote and illustrated his own reporting.

In 1933, the rise of Adolf Hitler convinced Eichenberg, a public critic of the Nazis, to emigrate with his wife and children to the United States, where he settled in New York City for most of the remainder of his life. He taught art at the New School for Social Research and at Pratt Institute and was part of the WPA's Federal Arts Project and was a member of the Society of American Graphic Artists. Eichenberg also served as the head of the art department at the University of Rhode Island and laid out the printmaking studios there.

In his prolific career as a book illustrator, Eichenberg worked with many forms of literature but specialized in material with elements of extreme spiritual and emotional conflict, fantasy, or social satire, illustrating such authors as include Dostoyevsky, Tolstoy, Charlotte and Emily Brontë, Poe, Swift, and Grimmelshausen. He also wrote and illustrated books of folklore and children's stories.

Raised in a non-religious family, Eichenberg had been attracted to Taoism as a child. Following his wife's unexpected death in 1937, he turned briefly to the practice of Zen Buddhist meditation, then joined the Religious Society of Friends in 1940. Though he remained a Quaker until his death, Eichenberg was also associated with Catholic charity work through his friendship with Dorothy Day—whom he met at a Quaker conference on religion and publishing in 1949—and frequently contributed illustrations to Day's newspaper the Catholic Worker.

Eichenberg was a long-time contributor to The Nation, his illustrations appearing in that magazine at various times between 1930 and 1980.

In 1947, he was elected into the National Academy of Design as an Associate member, and became a full Academician in 1949.

Eichenberg was a former director of Graphic Arts Center in Brooklyn and was on the faculty of Pratt Institute and later a former head of the art department at University of Rhode Island.

He died at home in Peace Dale, Rhode Island, on November 30, 1990, at age 89 of complications from Parkinson's disease.

== Selected works ==
- The Wood and the Graver: The Work of Fritz Eichenberg. Published by Clarkson N. Potter, 1977. ISBN 978-0-517-52910-2.
- Mistress Masham's Repose, 1946, illustrations for the children's book by T. H. White
- The Art of the Print: Masterpieces, History, and Technique, 1976
