= Catholic Charities USA =

Network of Christian charities based in Virginia

- Abbreviation: CCUSA
- Founded: September 25, 1910; 116 years ago (Note: As National Conference of Catholic Charities)
- Type: Humanitarian aid
- Tax ID no.: 53-0196620
- Headquarters: 2050 Ballenger Avenue, Suite 400, Alexandria, VA 22314
- Origins: Ursulines in New Orleans
- Region served: United States
- Key people: CEO Kerry Alys Robinson
- Website: catholiccharitiesusa.org
- Formerly called: National Conference of Catholic Charities

Catholic Charities USA (CCUSA) is the national voluntary membership organization for Catholic Charities agencies throughout the United States and its territories. Catholic Charities USA is a member of Caritas Internationalis, an international federation of Catholic social service organizations. Catholic Charities USA is the national office of 167 local Catholic Charities agencies nationwide.

Founded in 1910 as the National Conference of Catholic Charities (NCCC), the organization changed its name in 1986 to Catholic Charities USA (CCUSA). Donna Markham was the first female president to lead CCUSA. She held the position from 2015 to 2023. On July 25, 2023, Catholic Charities USA announced that Kerry Alys Robinson, an expert in Catholic leadership and philanthropy, would succeed Markham as the next president and CEO of CCUSA beginning on August 23, 2023.

The organization's archives are housed at the Catholic University of America.

== Services ==
The CCUSA Volunteer of the Year Award, given annually since 1998, is granted to an individual who embodies the mission of CCUSA. Catholic Charities agencies across the U.S. nominate candidates for the award from nearly 300,000 volunteers. Past winners include Daisy "Estelle" Anderson, who created layettes for more than 10,000 families over the past thirty years. This includes creating crib linens, clothing, toys and diapers for newborns in need.

=== Disaster relief ===
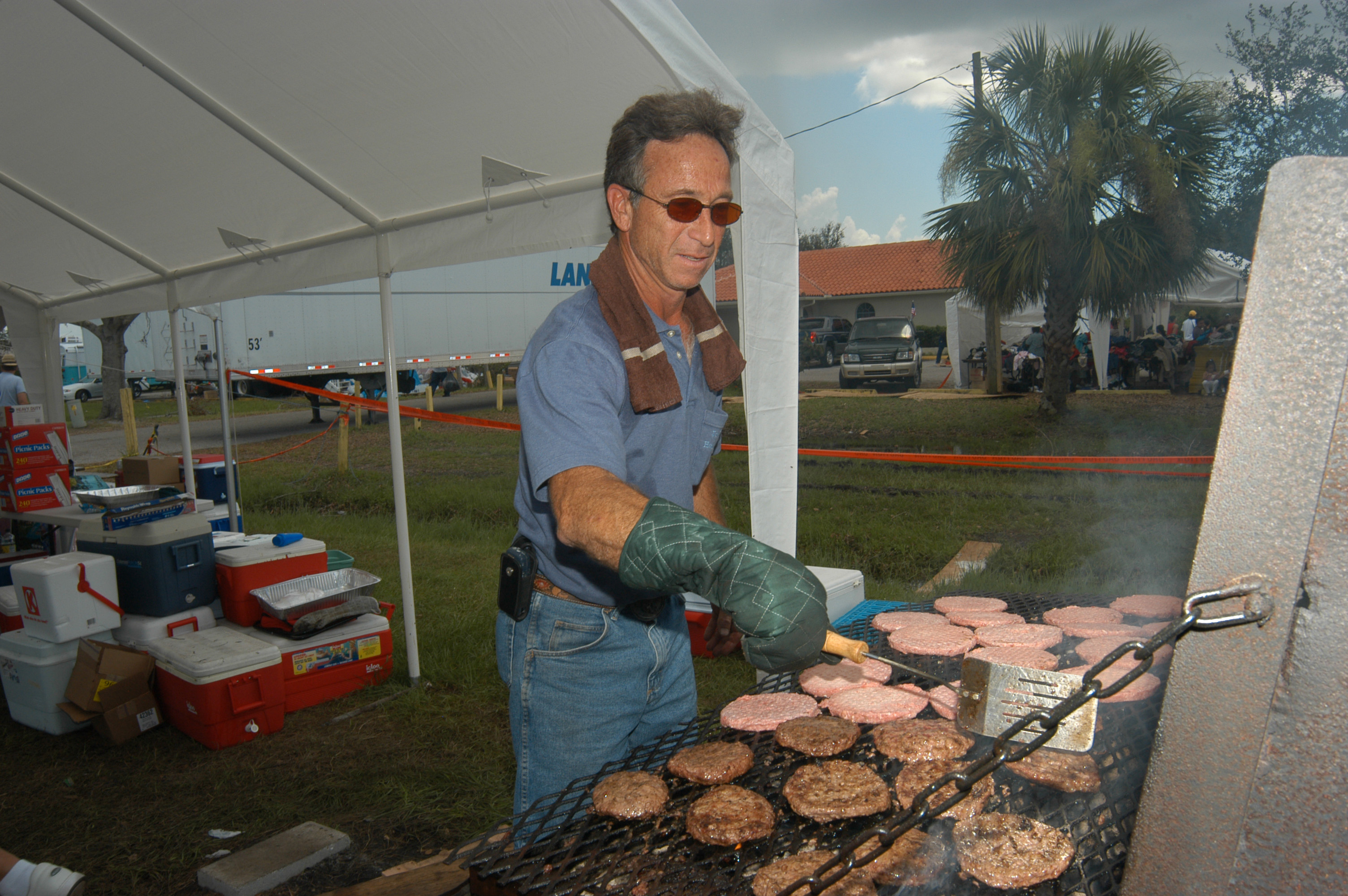
Arcadia, Florida, August 29, 2004 – A Catholic Relief Charities volunteer cooks burgers for residents affected by Hurricane Charley.

In 1990, the U.S. Conference of Catholic Bishops commissioned CCUSA to respond to disasters in the United States. Relief and recovery services are provided at the local level by Catholic Charities agencies across the country. These agencies provide critical services including emergency food, shelter, direct financial assistance, counseling, and support. CCUSA's Disaster Operations coordinates the Catholic Church's response to disasters in the United States and grants relief funds to local Catholic Charities agencies to support their relief efforts. Catholic Charities has responded to disasters across the country, including the attacks on September 11, Hurricanes Katrina and Rita, the Gulf Coast oil spill, and the impact of Superstorm Sandy.

== Governance ==
Catholic Charities USA is governed by a Board of Trustees, many of whom lead local Catholic Charities agencies across the country. There are 167 member organizations nationwide, nearly one per diocese.

=== Presidents ===
- William Kerby (1910–1920)
- John O'Grady (1920–1961)
- Tom Harvey
- Fred Kammer (1992–2001)
- J. Bryan Hehir (2001–2003)
- Larry J. Snyder (2005–2015)
- Donna Markham (2015–2023)
- Kerry Alys Robinson (2023–present)

== Finances ==
Catholic Charities uses about 89% of its revenue for program costs. Catholic Charities is listed as an Accredited Charity by the Better Business Bureau Wise Giving Alliance.

In 2010, Catholic Charities had revenues of $4.7 billion, $2.9 billion of which came from the US government. About $140 million came from donations from diocesan churches, the remainder coming from in-kind contributions, investments, program fees, and community donations. The Catholic Charities of the Archdiocese of Washington holds a fundraising gala every year and raised $2.4 million in 2017.

== History ==
In 1727, French Ursuline Sisters founded an orphanage in New Orleans, Louisiana, the first Catholic charitable institution in the area that later became the United States. During the nineteenth century, provision of Catholic charity was for the most part a local matter. However, the Society of Saint Vincent de Paul, which was organized in the United States in 1845 in St. Louis, Missouri, soon spread to other cities and dioceses. The SVDP Society held national meetings, which served as a point of contact for members working at the local level, and played a significant role in the formation of the National Conference of Catholic Charities.

By 1900, there were more than 800 Catholic institutions dedicated to the care of children, the elderly, the sick, and the disabled. According to Jack Hansan of the Social Welfare History Project, by 1910 about half of the approximately 15 million Catholics in the United States lived in poverty. Only three diocesan charity agencies were organized prior to 1910. The San Francisco earthquake of 1906 and ensuing fire prompted the Archdiocese of San Francisco to form Catholic Charities CYO the following year to assist destitute families and care for children who were orphaned by the disaster.

=== National Conference of Catholic Charities ===
On September 25, 1910, representatives of many service agencies met at The Catholic University of America at the invitation of its rector, Bishop Thomas J. Shahan, and formed the National Conference of Catholic Charities (NCCC) to support and coordinate their efforts. They held their final meeting at the White House at the invitation of President Taft.

The new organization drew its inspiration from the social teachings of Pope Leo XIII, whose Rerum novarum (1891), in one scholar's words, sought to "free [the Church] from paralyzing resistance to bourgeois civilization by shifting attention from the intractable problems of church and state to the social question, where a more flexible pastoral and evangelical approach might be possible." The organization's founding also paralleled the development of social work as a profession and the increasing cooperation among sectarian charitable organizations. Msgr. William J. Kerby, the first executive director of NCCC, described the problems a few years later: "The intense individualism of institutional and geographical units of the Church's life has ... led to a variety and resourcefulness that have been admirable. But it has resulted in a mutual independence and lack of coordination that have undoubtedly interfered with progress in certain ways...." Several Catholic educational institutions established social work programs in the decade after the founding of the NCCC, beginning with Loyola of Chicago (1914) and Fordham (1916).

In 1917, the NCCC established the Catholic Charities Review to provide a forum for the exchange of ideas and theories, and a resource for those who could not attend meetings. Catholic Charities Review was the successor publication to the Vincentians' Quarterly.

Monsignor John O'Grady, a native of Ireland, worked alongside Kerby for several years. When Kerby stepped down as Executive Secretary in 1920, O'Grady became his successor. O'Grady became acquainted with Jane Addams, founder of Hull House, while studying in Chicago. Under his leadership, by 1931 there were fifty-eight diocesan organization functioning. Diocesan agencies began to expand their activities from dealing almost exclusively with the care of children to addressing wider issues of family welfare. The greatest challenge of O'Grady's tenure was the Great Depression. He served forty years as executive director and frequently spoke for the organization on matters of public policy. He supported the Social Security Act of 1935 and federal housing legislation. O'Grady fought against passage of the McCarran–Walter Act. The bill restricted immigration into the U.S., making it more difficult for World War II refugees to enter the United States. O'Grady said that the bill, which continued a national quota system that favored immigrants from Western European nations, "perpetuates the doctrine of Nordic superiority."

In March 1949, O'Grady, executive secretary of NCCC, testified before the House Ways and Means Committee in opposition to legislation proposed by the Truman administration that would have created a program of federal grants to support state relief and welfare programs. He said: "It envisages a complete governmental program that will virtually take over the entire field of child welfare. How can we maintain our spirit of Christian charity, our spirit of brotherhood, without the appeal of the great charitable institutions for the care of children?" He said it would "bring the Federal Government with all its rules and regulations into every community in the United States to set up governmental programs for the care of children" and that the legislation implied "national control over family life". He believed that some states were legally prohibited from purchasing services from religious organizations, and cited Pennsylvania as one where "Catholic and other religious childcare programs would be practically wiped out." In April, NCCC opposed Truman's proposed national health insurance program as well, and both measures were defeated. In September 1952, Truman appointed O'Grady to the President's Commission on Immigration and Naturalization.

=== 1980s to present ===
Pope John Paul II addressed the national conference of Catholic Charities USA in San Antonio, Texas, on September 14, 1987. His call for increased efforts on behalf of the poor and "to reform structures which cause or perpetuate their oppression" prompted coverage of the organization's activism, including, according to the New York Times, "a wide range of projects in antipoverty, legal aid, voter registration, housing and community organization." On March 10, 2006, it was announced that the Boston chapter would terminate its adoption work effective June 30, following issues regarding allowing same-sex adoptions. In 2010, after it was voted to legalize gay marriage in Washington, D.C., Catholic Charities in the district adjusted its benefits by halting giving them to spouses of employees. Spouses already enrolled in the plan were not affected. In 2011, Catholic Charities closed most of its Illinois affiliates after the state declined to renew its contracts with Catholic Charities for adoption and foster care services, following its requirement that Catholic Charities provide services to same-sex couples, because it accepted public funds.

During the 2012 debate over the Patient Protection and Affordable Care Act, Catholic Charities USA was among the Catholic groups that expressed support for the Obama administration's efforts to address religious objections to some features of its implementation, even as the National Conference of Catholic Bishops opposed the administration's proposals as part of a larger government attack on religious liberty. Several diocesan branches of Catholic Charities participated in a lawsuit against provisions related to birth control insurance coverage, but not the national organization.

Catholic Charities sponsors efforts to reduce homelessness in the United States, with cooperation with state and local government. In Saint Paul, Minnesota, Catholic Charities manages the Dorothy Day homeless shelter as well as the Higher Ground Saint Paul Shelter which provides shelter drop-in meals and career services.

In 2025, during the second presidency of Donald Trump, Catholic Charities USA received a federal funding freeze due to the organization's prioritization of immigrant affairs such as resettlement into American communities.

== See also ==
- Catholic charities
- Catholic Relief Services
- Catholic Campaign for Human Development
- Catholic Charities of the Archdiocese of Chicago
- Society of Saint Vincent de Paul
