= Dorothy Day =

American Catholic and social activist (1897–1980)

Servant of God Dorothy Day OblSB
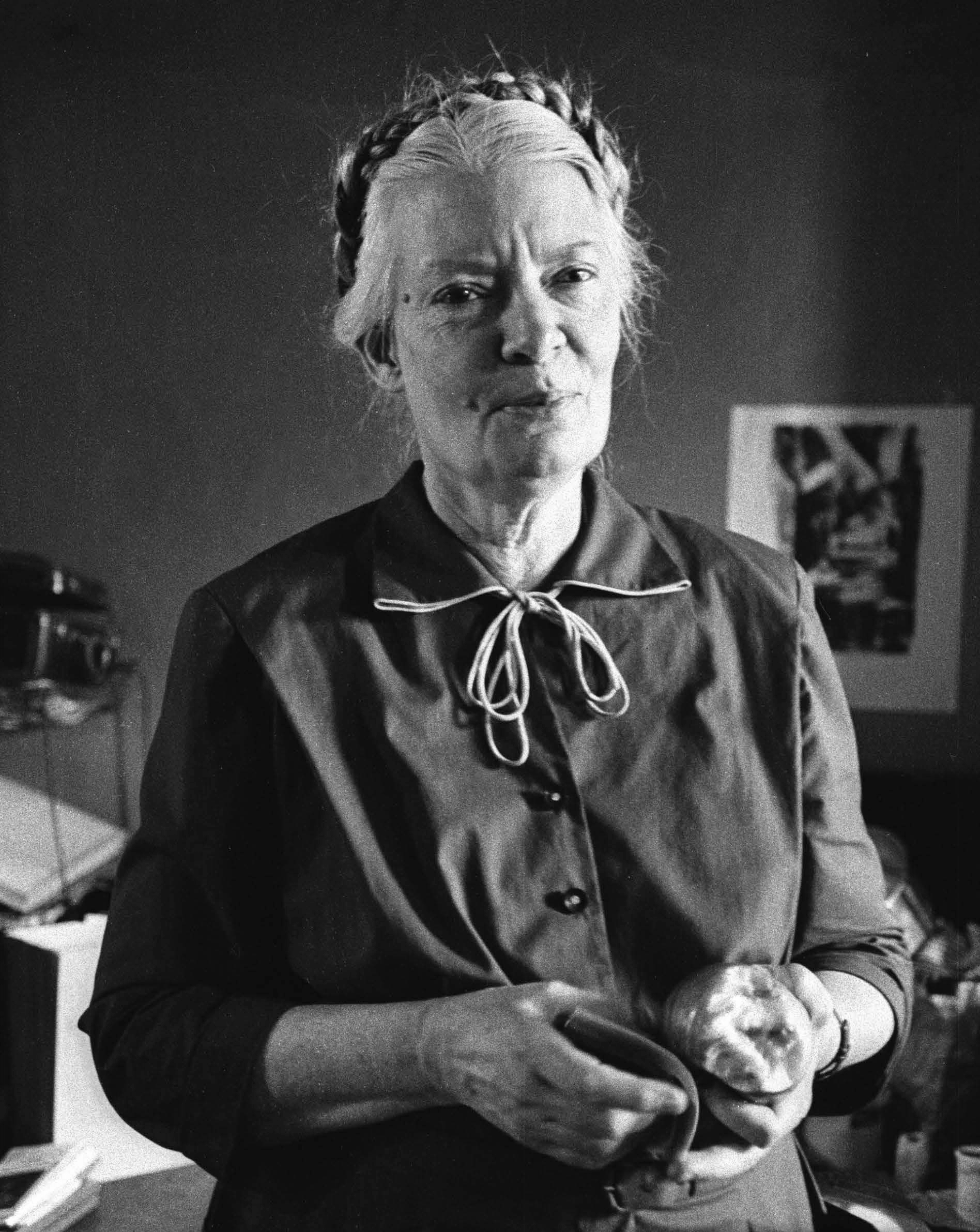
- Portrait by Vivian Cherry, 1955
- Born: Dorothy May Day; November 8, 1897; New York City, U.S.
- Hometown: Chicago, Illinois, U.S.
- Died: November 29, 1980 (aged 83); New York City, U.S.
- Resting place: Cemetery of the Resurrection, New York City

Dorothy May Day OblSB (November 8, 1897 – November 29, 1980) was an American journalist, social activist and anarchist who, after a bohemian youth, became a Catholic. She was perhaps the best-known political radical among American Catholics.

Day's conversion is described in her 1952 autobiography, The Long Loneliness. Day was also an active journalist, and described her social activism in her writings. In 1917, she was imprisoned as a member of suffragist Alice Paul's nonviolent Silent Sentinels. In the 1930s, Day worked closely with fellow activist Peter Maurin to establish the Catholic Worker Movement, a pacifist movement that combines direct aid for the poor and homeless with nonviolent direct action on their behalf. She practiced civil disobedience, which led to additional arrests in 1955, 1957, and (aged 75) in 1973.

As part of the Catholic Worker Movement, Day co-founded the Catholic Worker newspaper in 1933, and served as its editor from 1933 until her death in 1980. In this newspaper, Day advocated the Catholic economic theory of distributism, which she considered a third way between capitalism and socialism. Pope Benedict XVI used her conversion story as an example of how to "journey towards faith... in a secularized environment." In an address before the United States Congress, Pope Francis included her in a list of four exemplary Americans who "buil[t] a better future".

The Catholic Church has opened a beatification process for Dorothy Day. For that reason, the Church refers to her with the title Servant of God.

== Biography ==
=== Early years ===
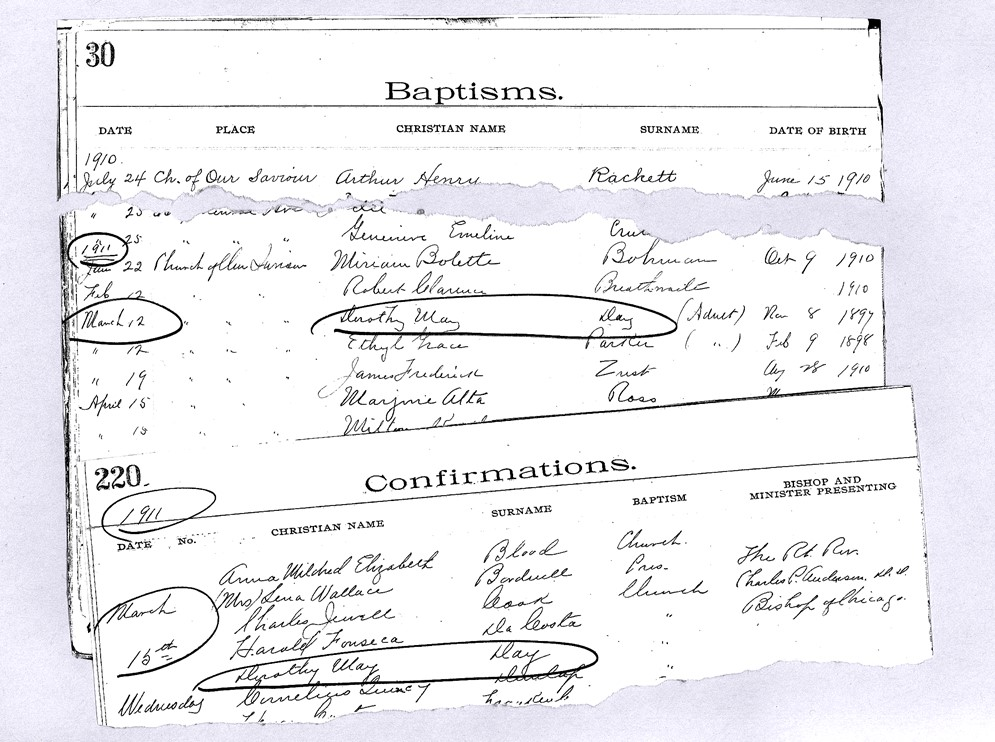
Dorothy Day Baptism and Confirmation records from the Episcopal Church of Our Saviour, Chicago, c. 1911

Dorothy May Day was born on November 8, 1897, in the Brooklyn Heights neighborhood of Brooklyn, New York. She was born into a family described by one biographer as "solid, patriotic, and middle class". Her father, John Day, was a Tennessee native of Irish heritage, while her mother, Grace Satterlee, a native of upstate New York, was of English ancestry. Her parents were married in an Episcopal church in Greenwich Village. She had three brothers (including Donald S. Day) and a sister and was the third oldest child. In 1904, her father, a sportswriter devoted to horse racing, took a position with a newspaper in San Francisco. The family lived in Oakland, California, until the San Francisco Earthquake of 1906 destroyed the newspaper's facilities, and her father lost his job. From the spontaneous response to the earthquake's devastation, the self-sacrifice of neighbors in a time of crisis, Day drew a lesson about individual action and the Christian community. The family relocated to Chicago.

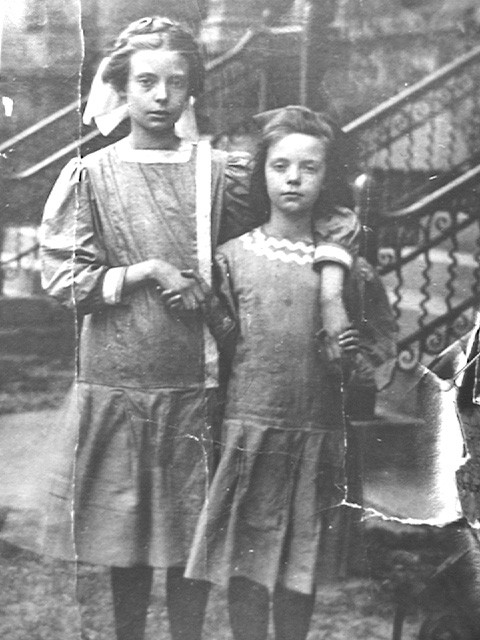
Day and sister Della outside the Episcopal Church of Our Saviour, Chicago, circa 1910

Day's parents were nominal Christians who rarely attended church. As a young child, she showed a marked religious streak, reading the Bible frequently. When she was ten, she started to attend the Church of Our Saviour, an Episcopal church in the Lincoln Park neighborhood of Chicago, after its rector convinced her mother to let Day's brothers join the church choir. She was taken with the liturgy and its music. She studied the catechism and was baptized and confirmed in that church in 1911.

Day was an avid reader in her teens, particularly fond of Upton Sinclair's The Jungle. She worked from one book to another, noting Jack London's mention of Herbert Spencer in Martin Eden, and then from Spencer to Darwin and Huxley. She learned about anarchy and extreme poverty from Peter Kropotkin, who promoted the belief that only cooperation and mutual aid could create a truly free society. She also enjoyed Russian literature while in university studies, especially Dostoevsky, Tolstoy, and Gorky. Day read a lot of socially conscious work, which gave her a background for her future; it helped bolster her support for and involvement in social activism. Day graduated from Robert Waller High School in 1914.

In 1914, Day attended the University of Illinois at Urbana–Champaign on a scholarship. She was a reluctant scholar. Her reading was chiefly in a Christian radical social direction. She avoided campus social life, and supported herself rather than rely on money from her father, buying all her clothing and shoes from discount stores. She left the university after two years, and moved to New York City.

=== Social activism ===
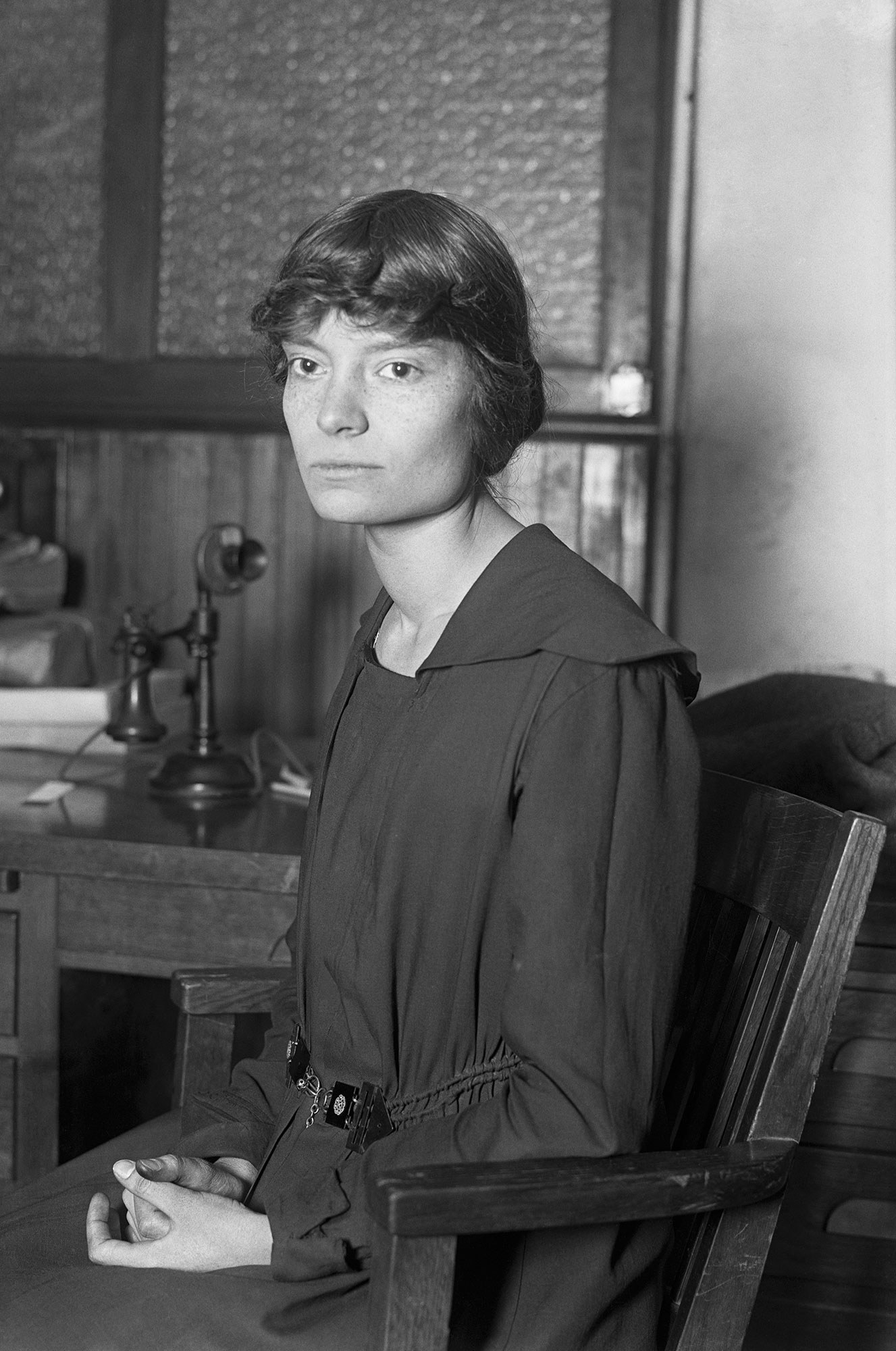
Day in 1916

Day settled on the Lower East Side of New York and worked on the staff of several Socialist publications, including The Liberator, The Masses, and The Call. She "smilingly explained to impatient socialists that she was 'a pacifist even in the class war.'" Years later, Day described how she was pulled in different directions: "I was only eighteen, so I wavered between my allegiance to Socialism, Syndicalism (of the Industrial Workers of the World – I.W.W.) and Anarchism. When I read Tolstoy I was an Anarchist. My allegiance to The Call kept me a Socialist, although a left-wing one, and my Americanism inclined me to the I.W.W. movement."

She celebrated the February Revolution in Russia in 1917, the overthrow of the monarchy and establishment of a reformist government. In November 1917, she was arrested for picketing at the White House on behalf of women's suffrage as part of a campaign called the Silent Sentinels organized by Alice Paul and the National Woman's Party. Sentenced to 30 days in jail, she served 15 days before being released, ten of them on a hunger strike.

Day spent several months in Greenwich Village, where she became close to Eugene O'Neill, whom she later credited with having produced "an intensification of the religious sense that was in me." She had a love affair of several years with Mike Gold, a radical writer who later became a prominent Communist. Later she credited Gold with being "indirectly involved" in the beginning of the Catholic Worker Movement. Day maintained friendships with such prominent American Communists as Anna Louise Strong and Elizabeth Gurley Flynn who became the head of the Communist Party USA.

Initially, Day lived a bohemian life. In 1920, after ending an unhappy love affair with Lionel Moise, and after having an abortion that was "the great tragedy of her life", she married Berkeley Tobey in a civil ceremony. She spent the better part of a year with him in Europe, removed from politics, focusing on art and literature, and writing a semi-autobiographical novel, The Eleventh Virgin (1924), based on her affair with Moise. In its "Epilogue", she tried to draw lessons about the status of women from her experience: "I thought I was a free and emancipated young woman and found out I wasn't at all. ... Freedom is just a modernity gown, a new trapping that we women affect to capture the man we want." She ended her marriage to Tobey upon their return to the United States.

Day later called The Eleventh Virgin a "very bad book". The sale of the movie rights to the novel gave her $2,500, and she bought a beach cottage as a writing retreat on Staten Island, New York. Soon she found a new lover, Forster Batterham, an activist and biologist, who joined her there on weekends. She lived there from 1925 to 1929, entertaining friends and enjoying a romantic relationship that foundered when she took passionately to motherhood and religion.

Day, who had thought herself sterile following her abortion, was delighted to find she was pregnant in mid-1925, while Batterham dreaded fatherhood. While she visited her mother in Florida, separating from Batterham for several months, she intensified her exploration of Catholicism. When she returned to Staten Island, Batterham found her increasing devotion, attendance at Mass, and religious reading incomprehensible. Soon after the birth of their daughter Tamar Teresa, on March 4, 1926, Day encountered a local Sister of Charity, Aloysia Mary Mulhern, and with her help educated herself in the Catholic faith and had her baby baptized in July 1927. Batterham refused to attend the ceremony. His relationship with Day became increasingly unbearable, as her desire for marriage in the Church confronted his antipathy to organized religion, Catholicism most of all. After one last fight in late December, Day refused to allow him to return. On December 28, she underwent conditional baptism in the Catholic Church with Sister Aloysia as her godparent, at the Church of Our Lady Help of Christians. (Note: A Russian neighbor's sister had named her daughter Tamar, and Day was impressed by St. Teresa of Avila, whose biography she had recently read.)

In the summer of 1929, to put Batterham behind her, Day accepted a job writing film dialogue for Pathé Motion Pictures and moved to Los Angeles with Tamar. A few months later, following the 1929 stock market crash, her contract was not renewed. She returned to New York via a sojourn in Mexico and a family visit in Florida. Day supported herself as a journalist, writing a gardening column for the local paper, the Staten Island Advance, and feature articles and book reviews for several Catholic publications, including Commonweal.

In 1932, inspired by conversations with Mike Gold's brother George, a leader of the upcoming Hunger March in Washington, D.C., she traveled to Washington to report on the march for Commonweal. Her experience there motivated her decision to take a greater role in social activism and Catholicism. During the hunger strikes in D.C. in December 1932, she wrote of being filled with pride watching the marchers, but she could not do much with her conversion. She comments in her autobiography: "I could write, I could protest, to arouse the conscience, but where was the Catholic leadership in the gathering of bands of men and women together, for the actual works of mercy that the comrades had always made part of their technique in reaching the workers?" Later, she visited the National Shrine of the Immaculate Conception in northeast D.C. to offer a prayer to find a way to use her gifts and talents to help her fellow workers and the poor.

=== Catholic Worker Movement ===
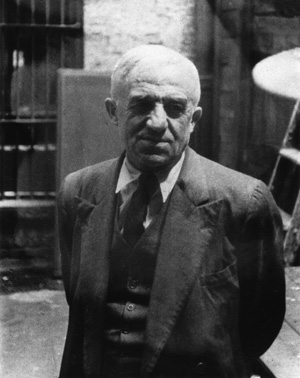
Peter Maurin, who co-founded the Catholic Worker Movement with Day in 1933

In 1932, Day met Peter Maurin, the man she always credited as the founder of the movement with which she is identified. Maurin, a French immigrant and something of a vagabond, had entered the Institute of the Brothers of the Christian Schools in his native France, before emigrating, first to Canada, then to the United States.

Despite his lack of formal education, Maurin was a man of deep intellect and decidedly strong views. He had a vision of social justice and its connection with the poor, which was partly inspired by St. Francis of Assisi. He had a vision of action based on sharing ideas and subsequent action by the poor themselves. Maurin was deeply versed in the writings of the Church Fathers and the papal documents on social matters that had been issued by Pope Leo XIII and his successors. Maurin provided Day with the grounding in Catholic theology of the need for social action they both felt.

Years later Day described how Maurin also broadened her knowledge by bringing "a digest of the writings of Kropotkin one day, calling my attention especially to Fields, Factories, and Workshops. Day observed: "I was familiar with Kropotkin only through his Memoirs of a Revolutionist, which had originally run serially in the Atlantic Monthly. She wrote: "Oh, far day of American freedom, when Karl Marx could write for the morning Tribune in New York, and Kropotkin could not only be published in the Atlantic, but be received as a guest into the homes of New England Unitarians, and in Jane Addams' Hull House in Chicago!" Maurin drew Day's attention to French models and literature.

The Catholic Worker Movement started when the Catholic Worker appeared on May 1, 1933, priced at one cent, and published continuously since then. It was aimed at those suffering the most in the depths of the Great Depression, "those who think there is no hope for the future," and announced to them that "the Catholic Church has a social program. ... There are men of God who are working not only for their spiritual but for their material welfare." It accepted no advertising and did not pay its staff. Publication of the first issue was supported in part by a $1 donation from Sister Peter Claver, for whom a Catholic Worker house was later named.

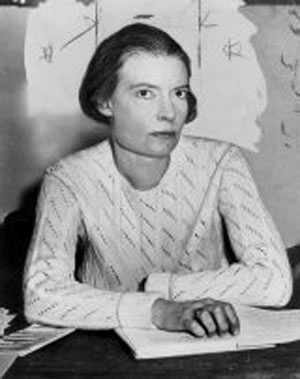
Day in 1934

Like many newspapers of the day, including those for which Day had been writing, it was an unapologetic example of advocacy journalism. It provided coverage of strikes and explored working conditions, especially for women and African American workers, and explained papal teaching on social issues. Its viewpoint was partisan and stories were designed to move its readers to take action locally, for example, by patronizing laundries recommended by the Laundry Workers' Union. Its advocacy of federal child labor laws put it at odds with the American Church hierarchy from its first issue. Still, Day removed some of Maurin's critiques of the Church hierarchy and tried to have a collection of the paper's issues presented to Pope Pius XI in 1935.

The paper's principal competitor in distribution and ideology was the Communist Daily Worker. Day opposed its atheism, its advocacy of "class hatred" and violent revolution, and its opposition to private property. The first issue of the Catholic Worker asked: "Is it not possible to be radical and not atheist?" and celebrated its distribution in Union Square on May Day as a direct challenge to the Communists. Day defended government relief programs like the Civilian Conservation Corps that the Communists ridiculed. The Daily Worker responded by mocking the Catholic Worker for its charity work and expressing sympathy for landlords when calling evictions morally wrong. In this fight, the Church hierarchy backed Day's movement and Commonweal, a Catholic journal that expressed a wide range of viewpoints, said that Day's background positioned her well for her mission: "There are few laymen in this country who are so completely conversant with Communist propaganda and its exponents." During this time, she became friends with many Catholic authors, including John C. Cort and Harry Sylvester. Sylvester dedicated his fourth novel, Moon Gaffney, to Day and Cort.

Over several decades, the Catholic Worker attracted such writers and editors as Michael Harrington, Ammon Hennacy, Thomas Merton, and Daniel Berrigan. From the publishing enterprise came a "house of hospitality", a shelter that provided food and clothing to the poor of the Lower East Side and then a series of farms for communal living. The movement quickly spread to other cities in the United States and to Canada and the United Kingdom. More than 30 independent but affiliated Catholic Worker communities had been founded by 1941.

In 1935, the Catholic Worker began publishing articles that articulated a rigorous and uncompromising pacifist position, instead of the traditional Catholic doctrine of just war theory. The next year, the two sides that fought the Spanish Civil War roughly approximated two of Day's allegiances, with the Church siding with Franco, fighting radicals of many stripes, the Catholic and the worker at war with one another. Day refused to side with Franco against the Republican forces, which were atheist and anticlerical in spirit, led by anarchists and communists (that is, the Republican forces were). She acknowledged the martyrdom of priests and nuns in Spain and said she expected the age of revolution she was living in to require more martyrs:

We must prepare now for martyrdom – otherwise, we will not be ready. Who of us, if he were attacked now, would not react quickly and humanly against such attack? Would we love our brother who strikes us? Of all at The Catholic Worker, how many would not instinctively defend himself with any forceful means in his power? We must prepare. We must prepare now. There must be a disarmament of the heart.

The paper's circulation fell as many Catholic churches, schools, and hospitals that had previously served as its distribution points withdrew support. Circulation fell from 150,000 to 30,000. In 1938, she published an account of the transformation of her political activism into religiously motivated activism in From Union Square to Rome. She recounted her life story selectively, without providing the details of her early years of "grievous mortal sin" when her life was "pathetic, little, and mean." She presented it as an answer to communist relatives and friends who have asked: "How could you become a Catholic?":

What I want to bring out in this book is a succession of events that led me to His feet, glimpses of Him that I received through many years, which made me feel the vital need of Him and of religion. I will try to trace for you the steps by which I came to accept the faith that I believe was always in my heart.

The Cardinal's Literature Committee of the New York Archdiocese recommended it to Catholic readers.

=== Continued activism ===
In the early 1940s, she affiliated with the Benedictines, in 1955 professing as an oblate of St. Procopius Abbey, in Lisle, Illinois. This gave her a spiritual practice and connection that sustained her throughout the rest of her life. She was briefly a postulant in the Fraternity of Jesus Caritas, which was inspired by the example of Charles de Foucauld. Day felt unwelcome there and disagreed with how meetings were run. When she withdrew as a candidate for the Fraternity, she wrote to a friend: "I just wanted to let you know that I feel even closer to it all, tho it is not possible for me to be a recognized 'Little Sister,' or formally a part of it."

Day reaffirmed her pacifism following the U.S. declaration of war in 1941 and urged noncooperation in a speech that day: "We must make a start. We must renounce war as an instrument of policy. ... Even as I speak to you, I may be guilty of what some men call treason. But we must reject war. ... You young men should refuse to take up arms. Young women tear down the patriotic posters. And all of you – young and old put away your flags." Her January 1942 column was headlined "We Continue Our Christian Pacifist Stand". She wrote:

We are still pacifists. Our manifesto is the Sermon on the Mount, which means that we will try to be peacemakers. Speaking for many of our conscientious objectors, we will not participate in armed warfare or in making munitions, or by buying government bonds to prosecute the war, or in urging others to these efforts. But neither will we be carping in our criticism. We love our country, and we love our President. We have been the only country in the world where men of all nations have taken refuge from oppression. We recognize that while in the order of intention we have tried to stand for peace, for love of our brother, in the order of execution, we have failed as Americans in living up to our principles.

The circulation of the Catholic Worker, following its losses during the Spanish Civil War, had risen to 75,000, but now plummeted again. The closing of many of the movement's houses around the country, as staff left to join the war effort, showed that Day's pacifism had limited appeal even within the Catholic Worker community.

On January 13, 1949, unions representing workers at cemeteries managed by the Archdiocese of New York went on strike. After several weeks, Cardinal Francis Spellman used lay brothers from the local Maryknoll seminary and then diocesan seminarians under his supervision to break the strike by digging graves. He called the union action "Communist-inspired". Employees of the Catholic Worker joined the strikers' picket line, and Day wrote Spellman, telling him he was "misinformed" about the workers and their demands, defending their right to unionize and their "dignity as men", which she deemed far more critical than any dispute about wages. She begged him to take the first steps to resolve the conflict: "Go to them, conciliate them. It is easier for the great to give in than the poor."

Spellman stood fast until the strike ended on March 11, when the union members accepted the Archdiocese's original offer of a 48-hour 6-day work week. Day wrote in the Catholic Worker in April: "A Cardinal, ill-advised, exercised so overwhelming a show of force against the union of poor working men. There is a temptation of the devil to that most awful of all wars, the war between the clergy and the laity." Years later, she explained her stance vis-à-vis Spellman: "[H]e is our chief priest and confessor; he is our spiritual leader – of all of us who live here in New York. But he is not our ruler."

On March 3, 1951, the Archdiocese ordered Day to cease publication or remove the word Catholic from her publication name. She replied with a respectful letter that asserted as much right to publish the Catholic Worker as the Catholic War Veterans had to their name and their own opinions independent of those of the Archdiocese. The Archdiocese took no action, and later, Day speculated that perhaps church officials did not want members of the Catholic Worker Movement holding prayer vigils for him to relent: "We were ready to go to St. Patrick's, fill up the Church, stand outside it in prayerful meditation. We were ready to take advantage of America's freedoms so that we could say what we thought and do what we believed to be the right thing to do."

Day's autobiography, The Long Loneliness, was published in 1952 with illustrations by the Quaker Fritz Eichenberg. The New York Times summarized it a few years later:

The autobiography, well and thoughtfully told, of a girl with a conventional upstate New York background whose concern for her neighbors, especially the unfortunate, carried her into the women's suffrage movement, socialism, the I.W.W., communism, and finally into the Church of Rome, where she became a co-founder of the Catholic Worker Movement.

On June 15, 1955, Day joined a group of pacifists in refusing to participate in civil defense drills scheduled that day. Some of them challenged the constitutionality of the law under which they were charged, but Day and six others believed that their refusal was not a legal dispute but one of philosophy. Day said she was doing "public penance" for the United States' first use of an atom bomb. They pleaded guilty on September 28, 1955, but the judge refused to send them to jail, saying, "I'm not making any martyrs." She did the same in each of the next five years. In 1958, instead of taking shelter, she joined a group picketing the offices of the U.S. Atomic Energy Commission. After some years, the sentences were suspended; on another occasion, however, she did serve thirty days in jail.

In 1956, along with David Dellinger and A. J. Muste, two veteran allies in the pacifist movement, Day helped found Liberation magazine.

In 1960, she praised Fidel Castro's "promise of social justice". She said: "Far better to revolt violently than to do nothing about the poor destitute." Several months later, Day traveled to Cuba and reported her experiences in a four-part series in the Catholic Worker. In the first of these, she wrote: "I am most of all interested in the religious life of the people and so must not be on the side of a regime that favors the extirpation of religion. On the other hand, when that regime is bending all its efforts to make a good life for the people, a naturally good life (on which grace can build) one cannot help but be in favor of the measures taken."

Day hoped that the Second Vatican Council would endorse nonviolence as a fundamental tenet of Catholic life and denounce nuclear arms, both their use in warfare and the "idea of arms being used as deterrents, to establish a balance of terror." She lobbied bishops in Rome and joined with other women in a ten-day fast. She was pleased when the Council in Gaudium et spes (1965), its statement on "the Church in the Modern World", said that nuclear warfare was incompatible with traditional Catholic just war theory: "Every act of war directed to the indiscriminate destruction of whole cities or vast areas with their inhabitants is a crime against God and man, which merits firm and unequivocal condemnation."

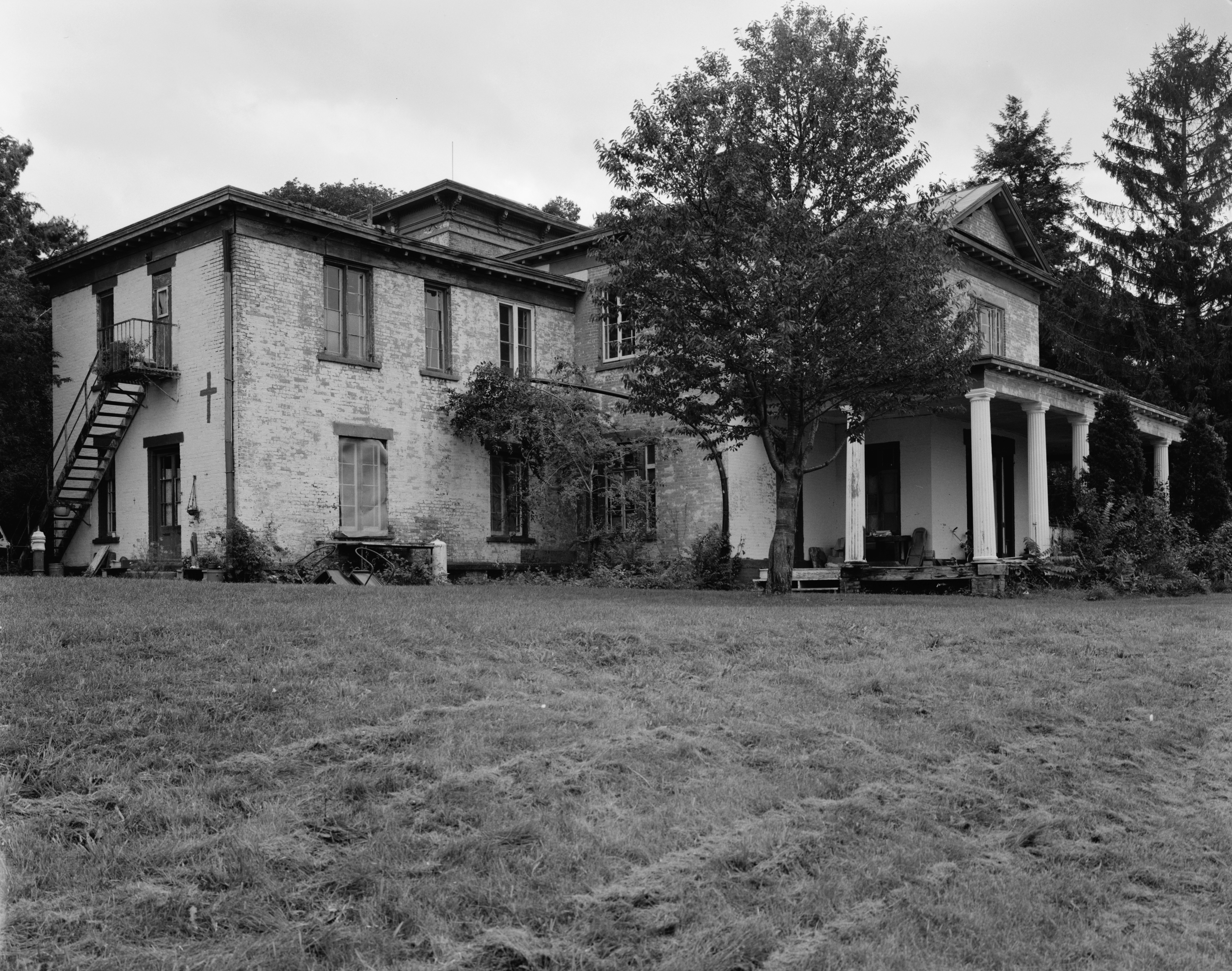
Rose Hill Catholic Worker farm in Tivoli, New York, 1964–1978

Day's account of the Catholic Worker Movement, Loaves and Fishes, was published in 1963. While she held anti-establishment sympathies, Day's judgment of the 60s counterculture was nuanced. She enjoyed it when Abbie Hoffman told her she was the original hippie, accepting it as a form of tribute to her detachment from materialism. Simultaneously, she disapproved of many who called themselves hippies. She described some she encountered in 1969 in Minnesota: "They are marrying young – 17 and 18, and taking to the woods up by the Canadian border and building houses for themselves – becoming pioneers again." But she recognized in them the self-indulgence of middle-class affluence, people who had "not known suffering" and lived without principles. She imagined how soldiers returning from Vietnam would want to kill them. Still, she thought what the "flower-people" deserved was "prayer and penance". Day struggled as a leader with influence but without direct authority over the Catholic Worker houses, even the Tivoli Catholic Worker Farm that she visited regularly. She recorded her frustration in her diary: "I have no power to control smoking of pot, for instance, or sexual promiscuity, or solitary sins."

In 1966, Spellman visited U.S. troops in Vietnam at Christmas, where he was reported as saying: "This war in Vietnam is... a war for civilization." Day authored a response in the January 1967 issue of the Catholic Worker that avoided direct criticism but cataloged all the war zones Spellman had visited over the years: "It is not just Vietnam, it is South Africa, it is Nigeria, the Congo, Indonesia, all of Latin America." Visiting was "a brave thing to do", she wrote, and asked: "But oh, God, what are all these Americans doing all over the world so far from our own shores?"

In 1970, at the height of American participation in the Vietnam War, she described Ho Chi Minh as "a man of vision, as a patriot, a rebel against foreign invaders" while telling a story of a holiday gathering with relatives where one needs "to find points of agreement and concordance, if possible, rather than the painful differences, religious and political."

=== Later years ===
In 1971, Day was awarded the Pacem in Terris Peace and Freedom Award of the Interracial Council of the Catholic Diocese of Davenport, Iowa. The University of Notre Dame awarded her its Laetare Medal in 1972. Franciscan University of Steubenville awarded her, alongside Mother Teresa, its Poverello Medal in 1976.

Despite suffering from poor health, Day visited India, where she met Mother Teresa and saw her work. In 1971, Day visited Poland, the Soviet Union, Hungary, and Romania as part of a group of peace activists, with the financial support of Corliss Lamont, whom she described as a "'pinko' millionaire who lived modestly and helped the Communist Party USA." She met with three members of the Writers' Union and defended Alexander Solzhenitsyn against charges that he had betrayed his country. Day informed her readers that:

Solzhenitsin lives in poverty and has been expelled from the Writers Union and cannot be published in his own country. He is harassed continually, and recently his small cottage in the country has been vandalized and papers destroyed, and a friend of his who went to bring some of his papers to him was seized and beaten. The letter Solzhenitsin wrote protesting this was widely printed in the west, and I was happy to see, as a result, a letter of apology by the authorities in Moscow, saying that it was the local police who had acted so violently.

Day visited the Kremlin. She reported: "I was moved to see the names of the Americans, Ruthenberg and Bill Haywood, on the Kremlin Wall in Roman letters, and the name of Jack Reed (with whom I worked on the old Masses), in Cyrillac [sic] characters in a flower-covered grave." Ruthenberg was C. E. Ruthenberg, founder of the Communist Party USA. Bill Haywood was a key figure in the IWW. Jack Reed was the journalist better known as John Reed, author of Ten Days That Shook the World.

In 1972, the Jesuit magazine America marked her 75th birthday by devoting an entire issue to Day and the Catholic Worker Movement. The editors wrote: "By now if one had to choose a single individual to symbolize the best in the aspiration and action of the American Catholic community during the last forty years, that one person would certainly be Dorothy Day."

Day had supported the work of Cesar Chavez in organizing California farm laborers from the beginning of his campaign in the mid-1960s. She admired him for being motivated by religious inspiration and committed to nonviolence. In the summer of 1973, she joined Chavez in his campaign for farm laborers in the fields of California. She was arrested with other protesters for defying an injunction against picketing and spent ten days in jail.

In 1974, Boston's Paulist Center Community named her the first recipient of their Isaac Hecker Award, given to a person or group "committed to building a more just and peaceful world."

Day made her last public appearance at the Eucharistic Congress held on August 6, 1976, in Philadelphia at a service honoring the U.S. Armed Forces on the United States Bicentennial. She spoke about reconciliation and penance and criticized the organizers for failing to recognize that for peace activists, August 6 is the day the first atomic bomb was dropped on Hiroshima, an inappropriate day to honor the military.

=== Death ===
Day suffered a heart attack and died on November 29, 1980, at Maryhouse, 55 East 3rd Street in Manhattan. Cardinal Terence Cooke greeted her funeral procession at the Church of the Nativity, the local parish church. Day was buried in the Cemetery of the Resurrection on Staten Island just a few blocks from the beachside cottage where she first became interested in Catholicism. Her gravestone is inscribed with the words Deo gratias. Day's daughter Tamar was with her mother when she died. Tamar and her father joined the funeral procession and attended a later memorial Mass the cardinal celebrated at St. Patrick's Cathedral. Day and Batterham had remained lifelong friends.

== Beliefs ==
=== Sympathy and identification with anarchists ===
Day encountered anarchism while studying at university. She read The Bomb by Frank Harris, a fictionalized biography of one of the Haymarket anarchists. She discussed anarchy and extreme poverty with Peter Kropotkin. After moving to New York, Day studied the anarchism of Emma Goldman and attended the Anarchists Ball at Webster Hall. Day was saddened by the executions of the anarchists Sacco and Vanzetti in 1927. She wrote that when they died, "All the nation mourned." As a Catholic, she felt a sense of solidarity with them, specifically "the very sense of solidarity which made me gradually understand the doctrine of the Mystical Body of Christ whereby we are all members of one another."

Day's anarchist, distributist economic views are similar to the anarchist Pierre-Joseph Proudhon's mutualist economic theory, by whom she was influenced. The influence of anarchists, such as Proudhon and Peter Kropotkin, also led her to label herself an anarchist. Dorothy states: "An anarchist then as I am now, I have never used the vote that the women won by their demonstrations before the White House during that period."

=== Catholic Church property ===
Bill Kauffman of The American Conservative wrote in 2011 of Day: "She understood that if small is not always beautiful, at least it is always human."

Day's belief in smallness also applied to the property of others, including the Catholic Church, as when she wrote: "Fortunately, the Papal States were wrested from the Church in the last century, but there is still the problem of investment of papal funds. It is always a cheering thought to me that if we have goodwill and are still unable to find remedies for the economic abuses of our time, in our family, our parish, and the mighty church as a whole, God will take matters in hand and do the job for us. When I saw the Garibaldi mountains in British Columbia... I said a prayer for his soul and blessed him for being the instrument of so mighty a work of God. May God use us!"

Jesuit priest Daniel Lyons "called Day 'an apostle of pious oversimplification.' He said that the Catholic Worker 'often distorted beyond recognition' the position of the Popes".

=== Catholic orthodoxy ===
Day's commitment to Church discipline is illustrated by an encounter with Fr. Daniel Berrigan, S.J., while on a Catholic Worker farm in New York. Berrigan was about to celebrate Mass for the community vested only in a stole. Day insisted that he put on the proper vestments before he began. When Berrigan complained about the law regarding liturgical vesture, Day responded, "On this farm, we obey the laws of the Church." He relented and celebrated the Mass fully vested.

=== Criticism of the state ===
In The Long Loneliness, Day said: "The state had entered to solve [unemployment] by dole and work relief, by setting up so many bureaus that we were swamped with initials … Labor was aiding in the creation of the Welfare State, the Servile State, instead of aiming for the ownership of the means of production and acceptance of the responsibility that it entailed."

== Contributions to the history of feminism ==
=== Lifelong devotion to the oppressed ===
The beginning of Day's career was inherently radical and rooted personalism and socialism; ideologies fundamental to intersectional feminism. Though Day did not explicitly identify as a feminist, this was not unusual for historical contributors to feminist work and philosophy. Much like her gravitation towards Catholicism, Day grew into her feminism; she is a "born again feminist", like Dolores Huerta. Day's lifetime of work, especially with the Catholic Worker Movement, aligns with core feminist principles of pushing against the kyriarchy to fight for rights of the oppressed. Her lifetime solidarity with and advocacy for the disadvantaged and marginalized is fundamentally feminist in its nature; providing aid to impoverished communities, supporting and providing a platform for activists and pacifists in her periodical, The Catholic Worker, and working to reform injustices within Catholicism. Day's ethos did not change when she was drawn to Catholicism; rather, her devotion to egalitarian Catholic values only propelled her radical feminism, blending her past with her newfound beliefs and values

Day forged a place for feminist theology in a religious world where women's experiences were largely not accounted for, or at worst, disregarded as anti-Church by male elites. Day took gendered, raced, classed experiences into account in her writing and work, providing a framework for a construction of religious theory and ethics which was finally both passable and accurate in reflecting the congregation. Through these acts, Day aligns herself and the Catholic Worker Movement with the ideology and practice of feminism. Day lived through several significant events in the history of feminism: women's suffrage, labor rights, and movements in the 50s, 60s, and 70s which crusaded for equality, justice, and egalitarianism; all pillars of feminism. In all these things, Day never deviated from The Church's teachings on the sanctity of human life from conception till natural death.

==== Life-inspired works ====
Day wrote constantly throughout her life, journalling and writing bits for herself. She published several autobiographical works: The Eleventh Virgin, From Union Square to Rome, The Long Loneliness, and Loaves and Fishes. The four volumes together form a lifelong portrayal of Day's life. Writing autobiographies, especially about women, can be framed as a feminist act, as it provides direct access to information about prominent figures outside of the academic realm, and allows for greater representation of women in history.

The Eleventh Virgin, a coming of age story published in 1924, is autobiographical. Though Day does not directly refer to herself, the protagonist, June, represents Day. June's experiences mirror Day's youth. The Eleventh Virgin is Day's first installment in her series of autobiographical works, but the only that she is reported regretting later in life. The raw portrayal of Day's bohemian youth before her conversion to Catholicism did not align with her any longer. The representation of Day's early experiences and growth through adolescence, especially at the time of publication, was uncommon. The Eleventh Virgin is a feminist text in its narrative and character's experiences, and the access it provided.

==== Rejection of gender roles ====
Day was known for her knack for leveraging and undermining gender norms to fight patriarchal and kyriarchal systems in the workplace, politics, social structures, and the Catholic Church. From a young age, growing up in a family of journalists, Day was made very aware of her perceived limitations as a woman in the world of journalism. Her father played a part in this – speaking to colleagues behind Day's back in an effort to prevent them from hiring her. She eventually got her foot in the door as an "office girl", a position that aligned with both her family and the Church's stance on appropriate work for women outside of the home. Day was instructed to "write like a woman", in a simple, declarative manner, but eventually grew her writing, centring on women's and social issues, from both a feminist and personalist perspective. She outright rejected what was currently being published about perceived women's issues.

As girls do not wear trousers, nor shirts, it is a waste of time and of space to tell them how they can save and still look neat by pressing the trousers under the mattress and sleeping on them, and of turning in the cuffs of their shirt. And, anyway, this is not a column, or part column, to tell girls how to give condescendingly helpful hints on how to save and be content in the hall bedroom. It is merely an experience.

Day grew as a writer and a journalist, advancing her career and focusing on the type of journalism she found important, regardless of her gender.

I was bent on following the journalist's side of the work. I wanted the privileges of the woman and the work of the man without following the work of the woman. I wanted to go on picket lines, to go to jail, to write, to influence others, and so make my mark on the world. How much ambition and how much self-seeking there was in all this!

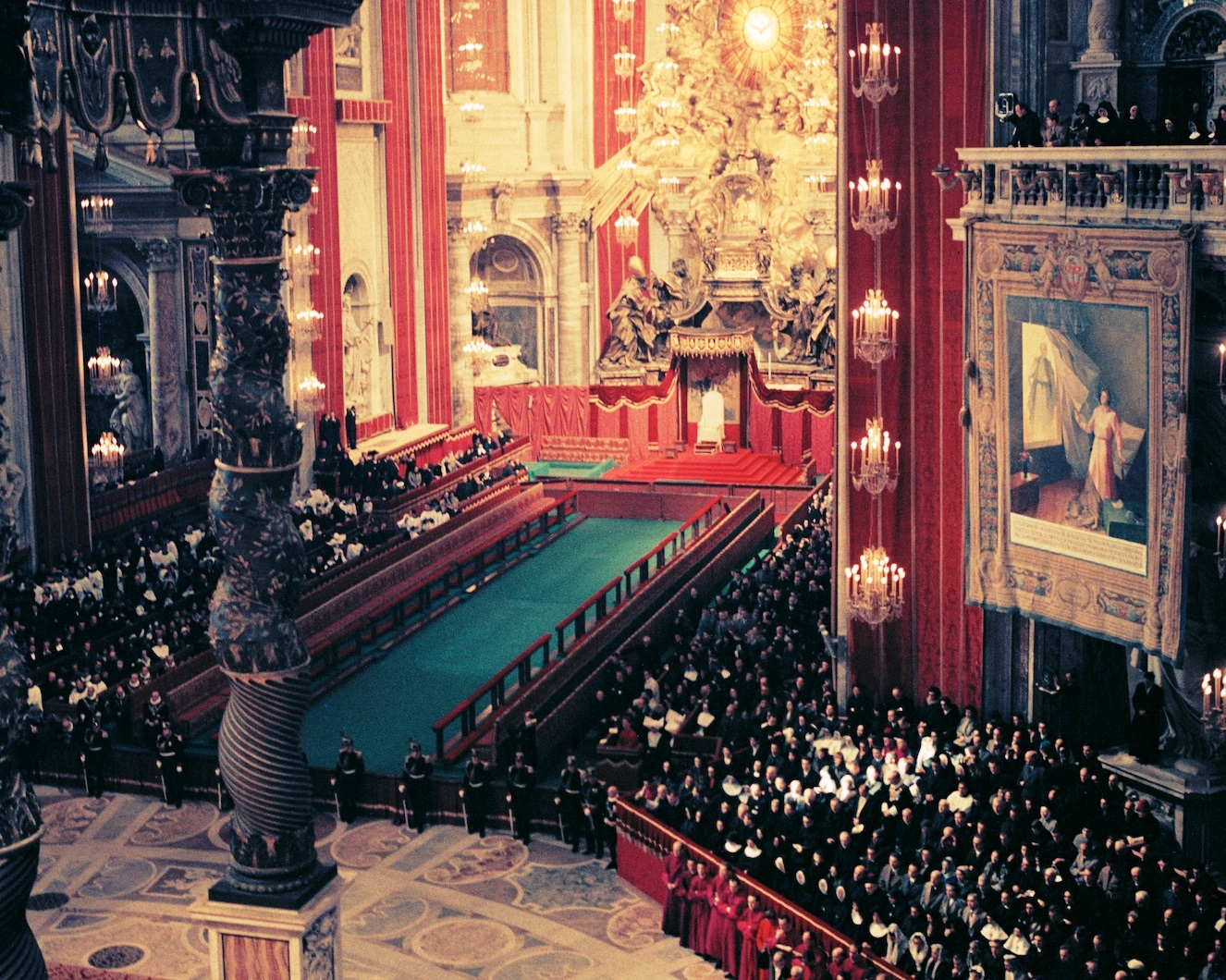
A photo of the Council Fathers at Vatican II

==== Radical Catholicism ====
Though Day spent most of her life involved with activism, her radical Catholic social activism is what she is most revered for posthumously. During the Vatican II Council, the most recent Ecumenical council of the Catholic church, Day, along with the Catholic Worker Movement and PAX, traveled to Rome. The plan was to persuade Pope John XXIII and the council to do away with the just war doctrine to support pacifism and conscientious objection in the name of Christian values and explicitly denouncing nuclear weapons.

With the Catholic Worker Movement, Day first focused on labor rights and aiding the disadvantaged, eventually calling for a nonviolent revolution against the industrial economy, militarism, and fascism. It was a deep belief of Day's that nonviolence, pacifism, and anarchism aligned with Christianity would result in a radical shift to a new order. Day's fight against the system was noticed by the American government. President Herbert Hoover felt particularly threatened, having pushed for Attorney General Harry M. Daugherty to prosecute the Catholic Worker Movement several times for sedition and incitement, despite the Movement's pacifist stance. The FBI monitored the Catholic Worker Movement from 1940 to 1970; Day was jailed four times in this period.

Day's involvement with the Catholic Worker Movement and commitment to liberation theology fundamentally aligns with the values of feminism: fighting for social and political equality for all people, regardless of race, gender, or class. Her push against the Catholic Church and the military state served to promote egalitarianism and alleviate the oppressed. It is Day's commitment to liberation theology. Radical Catholicism contributes to her framing as a feminist and serves to demonstrate the nuance and overlap of both religious and feminist ideologies.

==== Social justice ====
Throughout her lifetime, Day's overarching concern was the expression and effects of the elite, of power, over the people. This concern is shared with both liberation theology and feminist ideology. Day called for a shift to anarchism, communism, and pacifism in the name of Christianity and Christian teachings. Her weapon of choice against oppressive systems was her writing, her voice.

Day wrote about vital happenings, matters of life and death, Japanese Chinese war, Ethiopian war, Spanish Civil War, World War II, Korean War, Vietnam war, labor strikes, on streetcars, in garment factories, sugar refineries, and smelting plants, and policies of conscription.

Day's effort in her writing was to highlight social injustices and serve as a voice for those who could not or did not know how to advocate for themselves, to spark a movement to remedy and protect from further oppression. Her advocacy and charity was prominent during tough times in American history, especially at the beginning of the Catholic Worker Movement during the Great Depression.

== Legacy ==
Judith Palache Gregory was Day's executor. Day's papers are housed at Marquette University, along with many records of the Catholic Worker Movement. Her diaries and letters were edited by Robert Ellsberg and published by Marquette University Press in 2008 and 2010, respectively. A new, 448-page biography appeared in 2020, which was extensively reviewed.

Attempts to preserve the Staten Island beach bungalow at the Spanish Camp community where she lived for the last decade of her life failed in 2001. Developers knocked her home down just as the New York City Landmarks Preservation Commission was about to declare it a historic landmark. About a half-dozen large, private homes now occupy the land.

In May 1983, a pastoral letter issued by the U.S. Conference of Catholic Bishops, "The Challenge of Peace", noted her role in establishing nonviolence as a Catholic principle: "The nonviolent witness of such figures as Dorothy Day and Martin Luther King has had profound impact upon the life of the Church in the United States." Pope Benedict XVI, on February 13, 2013, in the closing days of his papacy, cited Day as an example of conversion. He quoted from her writings and said: "The journey towards faith in such a secularized environment was particularly difficult, but Grace acts nonetheless."

On September 24, 2015, Pope Francis became the first pope to address a joint meeting of the United States Congress. Day was one of four Americans mentioned by the Pope in his speech to the joint session that included Abraham Lincoln, Martin Luther King Jr., and Thomas Merton. He said of Day: "Her social activism, her passion for justice and for the cause of the oppressed, were inspired by the Gospel, her faith, and the example of the saints."

=== Films ===
An independent film about Dorothy Day called Entertaining Angels: The Dorothy Day Story was released in 1996. Day was portrayed by Moira Kelly, and Peter Maurin was portrayed by Martin Sheen. A full-length documentary called Dorothy Day: Don't Call Me a Saint premiered in 2005. It was shown at the 2006 Tribeca Film Festival. Revolution of the Heart: The Dorothy Day Story, a film by Martin Doblmeier, aired on PBS in March 2020.

=== Music ===
A song honoring Dorothy and Peter Maurin (entitled "Dorothy Day and Peter Maurin"), written by the group The Chairman Dances, was premiered by PopMatters in 2016. In late 2021, America magazine and Catholic New York reported that the song was included in materials sent to the Vatican in consideration of Dorothy's canonization.

== Posthumous recognition ==
- In 1992, Day received the Courage of Conscience Award from the Peace Abbey.
- In 2001, Day was inducted into the National Women's Hall of Fame in Seneca Falls, New York.
- Dormitories at Lewis University in Romeoville, Illinois; the University of Scranton in Scranton, Pennsylvania; and Loyola University, Maryland, are named in her honor, as is the campus ministry at Xavier University.
- A professorship at St. John's University School of Law is named in her honor.
- At Marquette University, a dormitory floor bearing Day's name has been reserved for those drawn to social justice issues.
- The former Office of Service and Justice at Fordham University bore her name at both of the university's campuses.
- Saint Peter's College of Jersey City, New Jersey, named its Political Science Office the Dorothy Day House.
- Broadway Housing Communities, a supportive housing project in New York City, opened the Dorothy Day Apartment Building at 583 Riverside Drive in 2003.
- DC Comics character Leslie Thompkins is, according to her creator, Denny O'Neil, based on Day.
- Dorothy Day Center in Saint Paul, Minnesota, a homeless shelter managed by Catholic Charities.
- In 2018, following the Grand jury investigation of Catholic Church sexual abuse in Pennsylvania, DeSales University renamed its student union formerly named for Bishop Joseph McShea to the Dorothy Day Student Union.
- Dorothy Day is eponymous for the third Staten Island Ferry of the Ollis-class.
- Sacred Heart University in Fairfield, Connecticut, has a residence hall named after her, called Dorothy Day Hall.
- The University of Notre Dame has a room in Geddes Hall, home of the Center for Social Concerns, named for Dorothy Day.
- Manhattan College established a Dorothy Day Center for the Study and Promotion of Social Catholicism in 2022.

=== Catholic cause for sainthood ===
A proposal for Day's canonization by the Catholic Church was put forth publicly by the Claretian Missionaries in 1983. At the request of Cardinal John J. O'Connor, head of the diocese in which she lived, in March 2000 Pope John Paul II granted the Archdiocese of New York permission to open her cause, allowing her to be called a "Servant of God" in the eyes of the Catholic Church. As canon law requires, the Archdiocese of New York submitted this cause for the endorsement of the United States Conference of Catholic Bishops, which it received in November 2012. In 2015, Pope Francis praised Day before a joint session of the U.S. Congress.

Currently, Day's canonization cause has moved from the diocesan phase to the Roman phase. On December 8, 2021, the Solemnity of the Immaculate Conception, the Archdiocese of New York celebrated the conclusion of the diocesan phase of the canonization cause for Dorothy Day. At a Young Adult Mass held at New York City's St. Patrick's Cathedral, Cardinal Timothy M. Dolan formalized the send-off of the evidence of Dorothy Day's holiness, amassed by the Dorothy Day Guild, to the Congregation for the Causes of Saints in Rome. The remaining steps include the Vatican reviewing this evidence, passing the case to the pope, and documenting two miracles attributed to Day.

Some members of the Catholic Worker Movement have objected to the canonization process for being contradictory to Day's own values and concerns and for sanitizing Day's anti-imperialist stances. Others, including Day's granddaughter Martha Hennessy, and longtime friend, Kathleen Jordan, are actively working towards her canonization.

== Bibliography ==
- Dorothy Day (1924), The Eleventh Virgin, semi-autobiographical novel; Albert and Charles Boni; reissued Cottager 2011
- Dorothy Day (1938), From Union Square to Rome, Silver Spring, MD: Preservation of the Faith Press
- Dorothy Day (1939), House of Hospitality, From Union Square to Rome, New York, NY: Sheed and Ward; reprinted 2015 by Our Sunday Visitor
- Dorothy Day (1948), On Pilgrimage, diaries; reprinted 1999 by Wm. B. Eerdmans Publishing
- Dorothy Day (1952), The Long Loneliness: The Autobiography of Dorothy Day, New York, NY: Harper and Brothers
- Dorothy Day (1963), Loaves and Fishes: The Inspiring Story of the Catholic Worker Movement, New York, NY: Harper and Row; reprinted 1997 by Orbis Books
- Dorothy Day (1979), Therese: A Life of Therese of Lisieux, Templegate Publishing
- Dorothy Day, ed. Phyllis Zagano (2002), Dorothy Day: In My Own Words
- Dorothy Day, ed. Patrick Jordan (2002), Dorothy Day: Writings from Commonweal [1929–1973], Liturgical Press
- Dorothy Day, ed. Robert Ellsberg (2005), Dorothy Day, Selected Writings
- Dorothy Day, ed. Robert Ellsberg, (2008), The Duty of Delight: The Diaries of Dorothy Day
- Dorothy Day, ed. Robert Ellsberg, (2010), All the Way to Heaven: The Selected Letters of Dorothy Day
- Dorothy Day, ed. Carolyn Kurtz (2017), The Reckless Way of Love: Notes on Following Jesus, Plough Publishing

== See also ==
- List of peace activists
- Catherine Doherty
- Catholic social teaching
- Christian anarchism
- Christian democracy
- Christian pacifism
- Christian politics
- Christian socialism
- Committee of Catholics to Fight Anti-Semitism
- Distributism
- Hilaire Belloc and G. K. Chesterton
- Mutualism (economic theory)

== Works cited ==
- Coles, Robert (1987), Dorothy Day: A Radical Devotion, Radcliffe Biography Center, Perseus Books, conversations with Dorothy Day
- Forest, Jim (2011). All is Grace: A Biography of Dorothy Day. Maryknoll, NY: Orbis Books.
- Miller, William D. (1982). Dorothy Day: A Biography. NY: Harper & Row.
