= Peter Maurin =

French Catholic activist (1877–1949)

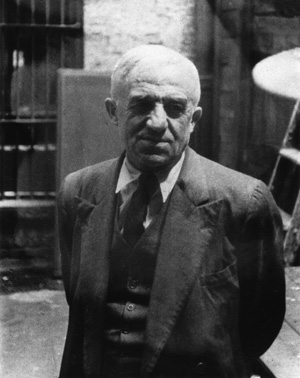
- Maurin in front of one of the first Catholic Worker houses
- Born: Pierre Joseph Orestide Maurin; May 9, 1877; Oultet, French Third Republic
- Died: May 15, 1949 (aged 72); Orange County, New York, U.S.
- Resting place: Middle Village, Queens County, New York, U.S.
- Other name: Aristide Pierre Maurin
- Occupations: Social activist; educator; laborer
- Known for: Co-founding the Catholic Worker

Peter Maurin (French: [moʁɛ̃]; May 9, 1877 – May 15, 1949) was a French Catholic social activist, theologian, and De La Salle Brother who founded the Catholic Worker Movement in 1933 with Dorothy Day.

Maurin expressed his philosophy through short pieces of verse that became known as Easy Essays. Influenced by the contemporary work of G. K. Chesterton and Vincent McNabb, he was one of the foremost promoters of the back-to-the-land movement and of Catholic distributism in the United States. He was also influenced by Peter Kropotkin, an anarchist, and while Maurin always accepted himself privately as one, he preferred to call himself a personalist.

== Biography ==
He was born Pierre Joseph Orestide Maurin into a poor farming family in the village of Oultet in the Languedoc region of southern France, where he was one of 24 children. After spending time in the De La Salle Brothers, Maurin served in the Sillon movement of Marc Sangnier until he became discouraged by the Sillonist shift from personalist action towards political action. He briefly moved to Saskatchewan to try his hand at homesteading, but was discouraged both by the death of his partner in a hunting accident and by the harsh conditions and rugged individualism that characterized his years of residence in the region. He then traveled throughout the American east for a few years, and eventually settled in New York.

"Round-table Discussions, Houses of Hospitality and Farming Communes--those were the three planks in Peter Maurin's platform. There are still Houses of Hospitality, each autonomous but inspired by Peter, each trying to follow Peter's principles. And there are farms, all different but all starting with the idea of the personalist and communitarian revolution. . . Peter was not disappointed in his life's work. He had given everything he had and he asked for nothing, least of all for success."

— Dorothy Day on Peter Maurin, in her article commemorating the centenary of his birth

For a ten-year period, Maurin was not a practicing Catholic "because I was not living as a Catholic should."

In the mid-1920s, Maurin was working as a French tutor in the New York suburbs. It was at this time Maurin experienced a religious conversion, inspired by the life of Francis of Assisi. He ceased charging for his lessons and asked only that students give any sum they thought appropriate. This was likely prompted by reading about St. Francis, who viewed labor as a gift to the greater community, not a mode of self-promotion. During this portion of his life, he began composing the poetry that would later be called his Easy Essays.

=== Dorothy Day and The Catholic Worker ===
"Peter Maurin first met Dorothy Day in December 1932." She had just returned from Washington, D.C., where she had covered the Hunger March for Commonweal and America magazines. At the Basilica of the National Shrine of the Immaculate Conception on December 8, 1932, the feast of the Immaculate Conception, Day had prayed for inspiration for her future work. She came back to her New York apartment to find Maurin awaiting her in the kitchen. "He had read some of her articles and had been told by George Schuster, editor of Commonweal, to look her up and exchange ideas with her." The French models and literature Maurin brought to Day's attention are of particular interest.

For four months after their first meeting, Maurin "indoctrinated" her, sharing ideas, synopses of books and articles, and analyzing all facets of daily life through the lens of his intellectual system. He suggested she start a newspaper, since she was a trained journalist, to "bring the best of Catholic thought to the man in the street in the language of the man in the street". Maurin initially proposed the name Catholic Radical for the paper that was distributed as the Catholic Worker beginning May 1, 1933, during the depths of the Great Depression.

His ideas served as the inspiration for the creation of "houses of hospitality" for the poor, for the agrarian endeavors of the Catholic Worker farms, and the regular "roundtable discussions for the clarification of thought" that began taking place shortly after the publication of the first issue of The Catholic Worker which is considered a Christian Anarchist publication.

Maurin at times saw the paper as not quite radical enough, as it had an emphasis on political and union activity. Shortly after the paper's first print run in early May, 1933, he left New York for the boys' camp at Mt. Tremper, where he worked in exchange for living quarters. "[T]he paper, declaring its solidarity with labor and its intention of fighting social injustice, was not, by Maurin's standards, a personalist newspaper." Maurin believed the Catholic Worker should stress life in small agricultural communities. As he liked to say, “there is no unemployment on the land.”

Maurin lived in Easton, Pennsylvania, where he worked on the first Catholic Worker-owned farming commune, Maryfarm. He also took part in the Catholic Worker picketing of the Mexican and German consulates during the 1930s.

Maurin traveled extensively, lecturing at parishes, colleges, and meetings across the country, often in coordination with the speaking tours of Dorothy Day. He addressed venues as varied as Harvard students and small parishes, the Knights of Columbus and gatherings of bishops and priests.

=== Later years ===
Catholic Radicalism: Phrased Essays For The Green Revolution, 1949

In 1944, Maurin began to lose his memory. His condition deteriorated until he died at the Catholic Worker's Maryfarm near Newburgh, New York, on May 15, 1949, "the Feast of St. Dymphna, patroness of mental health, the anniversary also of St. John Baptiste de la Salle and of the Papal encyclicals Rerum novarum and Quadragesimo anno. ...Many remarked the strange convergence of anniversaries." At the wake, many people were seen to touch their rosaries to his hands surreptitiously, indicating their belief in his sanctity. The Staten Island Catholic Worker farm was named after Maurin following his death; the Peter Maurin Farm currently operates in Marlboro, New York.

== Intellectual system ==
Maurin's vision to transform the social order consisted of three main ideas:

1. Establishing urban houses of hospitality to care for the destitute.
2. Establishing rural farming communities to teach city dwellers agrarianism and encourage a movement back-to-the-land.
3. Setting up roundtable discussions in community centres in order to clarify thought and initiate action.

Maurin saw similarities between his approach and what he viewed was that of the Irish monks who evangelized medieval Europe.

== Intellectual inspirations ==
According to Dorothy Day, some of the books he had her read were the works of "Fr. Vincent McNabb and Eric Gill, Jacques Maritain, Leon Bloy, Charles Peguy of France, Don Sturzo of Italy, (Romano) Guardini of Germany, and (Nicholas) Berdyaev of Russia." Another writer upon whom Maurin drew was Emmanuel Mounier. Other titles included Catholicism and the Appeal to Reason by Leo Paul Ward, Humanity's Destiny by Denifle, Christian Life and Worship by Gerald Ellard, The Spirit of Catholicism by Karl Adam, and The Servile State by Hilaire Belloc.

The following books were recommended by Peter Maurin in reading lists appended to his essays.

1. Art in a Changing Civilization, Eric Gill
2. Brotherhood Economics, Toyohiko Kagawa
3. Charles V, D. B. Wyndham Lewis
4. Catholicism, Protestantism and Capitalism, Amintore Fanfani
5. The Church and the Land, Father Vincent McNabb, O.P.
6. Discourse on Usury, Thomas Wilson
7. Enquiries Into Religion and Culture, Christopher Dawson
8. Fields, Factories and Workshops, Peter Kropotkin
9. Fire on the Earth, Paul Hanly Furfey
10. The Flight from the City, Ralph Borsodi
11. The Franciscan Message to the World, Father Agostino Gemelli, F.M.
12. Freedom in the Modern World, Jacques Maritain
13. The Future of Bolshevism, Waldemar Gurian
14. A Guildsman's Interpretation of History, Arthur Penty
15. The Great Commandment of the Gospel, His Excellency A. G. Cicognani, Apostolic Delegate to the U. S.
16. Ireland and the Foundation of Europe, Benedict Fitzpatrick
17. I Take My Stand, by Twelve Southern Agrarians
18. The Land of the Free, Herbert Agar
19. Lord of the World, Robert Hugh Benson
20. The Making of Europe, Christopher Dawson
21. Man the Unknown, Dr. Alexis Carrel
22. Nations Can Stay at Home, B. O. Wilcox
23. Nazareth or Social Chaos, Father Vincent McNabb, O.P.
24. Our Enemy, the State, Albert Jay Nock
25. Outline of Sanity, G. K. Chesterton
26. A Philosophy of Work, Étienne Borne
27. Post-Industrialism, Arthur Penty
28. Progress and Religion, Christopher Dawson
29. Religion and the Modern State, Christopher Dawson
30. Religion and the Rise of Capitalism, R. H. Tawney
31. La Revolution Personnaliste et Communautaire, Emmanuel Mounier
32. Saint Francis of Assisi, G. K. Chesterton
33. Social Principles of the Gospel, Alphonse Lugan
34. Soviet Man Now, Helen Iswolsky
35. Temporal Regime and Liberty, Jacques Maritain
36. The Theory of the Leisure Class, Thorstein Veblen
37. Thomistic Doctrine of the Common Good, The, Seraphine Michel
38. Things That Are Not Caesar's, Jacques Maritain
39. Toward a Christian Sociology, Arthur Penty
40. True Humanism, Jacques Maritain
41. The Two Nations, Christopher Hollis
42. The Unfinished Universe, T. S. Gregory
43. The Valerian Persecution, Father Patrick Healy
44. What Man Has Made of Man, Mortimer Adler
45. Work and Leisure, Eric Gill

== Legacy ==
His contributions to the Catholic Worker Movement, while apparently often eclipsed in the collective memory of the movement by those of Dorothy Day, remain foundational, as evidenced by Day's insistence in The Long Loneliness and elsewhere that she would never have begun the Catholic Worker without him. "Peter was a revelation to me," she said. "I do know this--that when people come into contact with Peter ... they change, they awaken, they begin to see, things become as new, they look at life in the light of the Gospels. They admit the truth he possesses and lives by, and though they themselves fail to go the whole way, their faces are turned at least towards the light."

Maurin was played by Martin Sheen in Entertaining Angels: The Dorothy Day Story.

In 2010 Mark and Louise Zwick suggested considering Peter Maurin for sainthood.

== See also ==
- Catholic social teaching
- Christian anarchism
- Christian pacifism
- Distributism
- Localism (politics)
- Social justice
