= Catholic Worker =

American Catholic newspaper

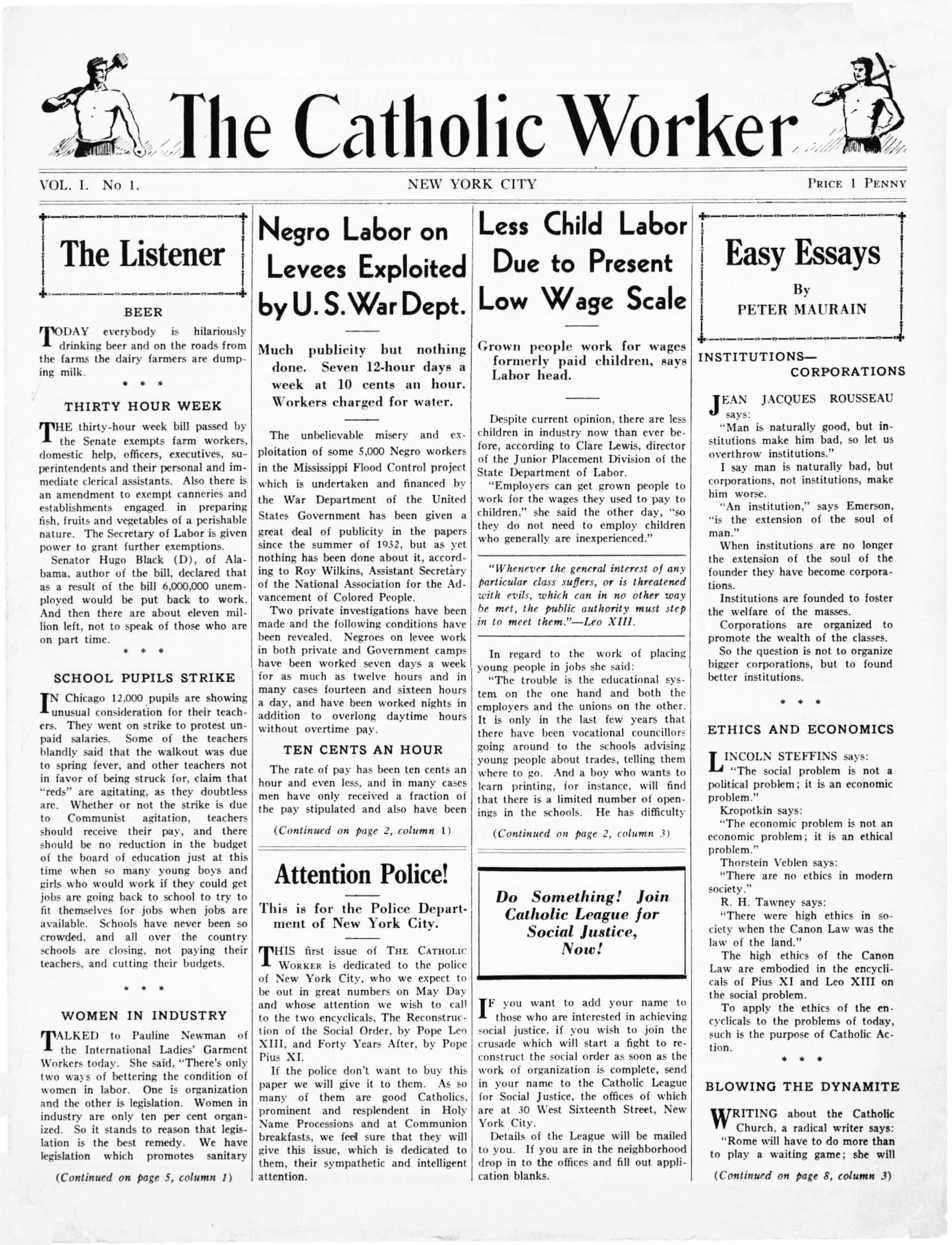
- The Catholic Worker, Volume 1, Number 1, 1 May 1933
- Type: Published 7 times a year
- Owner: The Catholic Worker
- Founder(s): Dorothy Day, Peter Maurin
- Publisher: The Catholic Worker Movement
- Associate editor: Cathy Breen, Bernard Connaughton, Monica Ribar Cornell, T. Christopher Cornell, Tom Cornell, Bill Griffin, Martha Hennessy, Jim Reagan, Jane Sammon, Carmen Trotta
- Managing editor: Amanda Daloisio & Joanne Kennedy
- Founded: May 1, 1933
- Language: English
- Headquarters: New York City, New York
- Circulation: 25,000
- ISSN: 0008-8463
- OCLC number: 1553601

The Catholic Worker is a newspaper based in New York City. It is published seven times a year by the flagship Catholic Worker community in New York City. It focuses on themes such as social justice, Catholic social teaching, pacifism, and activism. As of May 2023, it has about 26,000 mail subscribers. Despite transitioning towards decentralized distribution, specifics on circulation remain limited. Notably, the publication has refrained from offering a digital edition. Established in 1933 as a platform for the Catholic Worker Movement by Dorothy Day and Peter Maurin, the newspaper operates without formal leadership following the passing of its founders and is currently managed by editors Amanda Daloisio and Joanne Kennedy.

== History ==
=== Preconception ===
In 1928, Dorothy Day's conversion to Roman Catholicism marked a pivotal moment where her religious convictions intertwined with her political aspirations. This alignment was further solidified when she crossed paths with Peter Maurin, a French immigrant, in 1933. Maurin's arrival at Day's home sparked a meeting of minds, as they shared mutual ideas and visions. Their collaboration culminated in the establishment of the Catholic Worker Movement, spurred by their shared commitment to nonviolent revolution. This movement officially began in 1933 with the inception of The Catholic Worker newspaper, a platform they envisioned during their extensive discussions and deliberations.

Maurin proposed the idea to Day that the newspaper should be tailored for the unemployed. Drawing from his knowledge of European socialism and personalist philosophy, Maurin collaborated with Day, leveraging her journalistic skills and understanding of American culture.

In the initial stages of planning the publication, there was a divergence in opinions between Dorothy Day and Peter Maurin regarding the name of the newspaper. Maurin advocated for naming it The Catholic Radical, while Day, drawing from her background as a former Communist, believed that The Catholic Worker would better resonate with their intended audience. She elaborated that the term "Worker" in the paper's title included individuals engaged in physical, mental, or spiritual labor, particularly emphasizing the poor, the dispossessed, and the exploited.

=== Founding and early expansion (1933–1938) ===
The Catholic Worker was established in 1933 by Dorothy Day and Peter Maurin. The debut edition of the Catholic Worker was published on May Day in 1933. This edition, printed by a religious press, saw 2,500 copies distributed. Day sold the paper for a penny each in Union Square and Day contributed extensively to its content, writing the majority of its eight pages.

Maurin wanted the newspaper to be part of a bigger plan for Catholic social action. This plan involved a mix of learning to help people think intellectually, regardless of their background. It also included setting up places where the needy could get food, shelter, and companionship—called houses of hospitality. Maurin also thought about creating farm communities or agronomic universities. These places would give land and jobs to people who were struggling because of displacement by industrialisation.

While many Catholic social action movements in the U.S. focused on issues like public morality, parochial schools, and birth control, the Catholic Worker took a different approach. Since its first edition in May 1933, the Catholic Worker has discussed topics such as racism, pacifism, sweatshops, political corruption, labor unions, antisemitism, fascism, and Catholic social theory.

The readership increased significantly, and by September 1933, Day and Maurin were printing 20,000 papers. By 1935, the circulation of the Catholic Worker had risen to 110,000. And would reach 150,000 by 1936.

=== World War II and pacifist stance (1939–1945) ===
During World War II, the newspaper maintained a relatively high circulation, but it decreased due to its pacifist stance. This stance led to internal conflicts within the movement. By 1938, the paper's circulation had grown to 190,000. However, Dorothy Day's commitment to pacifism caused circulation to drop to 50,000 during the war.

In her position, Day strongly opposed antisemitism and fascism. However, she also criticized the Allies during World War II for failing to acknowledge the presence of Christ in their adversaries or to recognize God's existence amidst evil. Day believed that all U.S. citizens carried culpability before God for events like those in Hiroshima. She argued that standing in solidarity with all individuals, whether they be poor, allies, or enemies, as part of the mystical body of Christ, also entails sharing responsibility for their actions.

=== Post-War period and consistent circulation (1946–1950s) ===
Following Maurin's passing in 1949, Dorothy Day assumed leadership of the movement and continued to serve as the editor of its newspaper.

During the 1950s and 1960s, Dorothy Day's engagement with labor issues diminished as her attention shifted towards pacifism and disarmament advocacy. Her commitment to nonviolence prompted her to actively protest against the nuclear arms race, the Korean War, and other major conflicts of the time. By the 1950s, Day and fellow Catholic Workers believed that mere verbal opposition to war and militarism was insufficient. They felt compelled to personally engage and take responsibility for their actions.

Between 1955 and 1961, Catholic Workers in New York orchestrated acts of civil disobedience aimed at challenging the nuclear arms race, specifically targeting the compulsory annual air raid drills enforced by the Civil Defense Act.

Between 1947 and early 1960, circulation varied between 47,000 and 65,000 readers.

=== Later years and continued advocacy (1960s–1998) ===
The Catholic Worker covered the Civil rights movement in great depth as liturgically based social action. In 1950 it published a letter from Helen Caldwell Day Riley that led to her founding an African American Catholic Worker house in Memphis, Tennessee.

In 1980, circulation became 100,000 readers.

Day became increasingly reclusive, reducing her writing output and travel commitments. However, she remained involved in editing the newspaper until her death in 1980.

=== Modern era (1998–present) ===
The Catholic Worker maintains a price of one penny per copy, ensuring affordability for all readers. Additionally, an annual subscription is available for 25 cents, with seven issues distributed throughout the year. However, foreign subscriptions are priced at 30 cents.

In both 2020 and 2022, the Catholic Worker maintained around 20,000 mail subscribers. Additionally, the collective movement has expanded significantly from its origins as a newspaper and a single small house in New York to encompassing 187 communities in a decentralized network, collaborating with numerous partners worldwide.

According to The Nation, as of May 2023, it has approximately 26,000 subscribers.

According to managing editor Joanne Kennedy, they continue to manually lay out the paper instead of using digital software. Additionally, they have consciously opted against having a website or email. They have deliberately abstained from releasing a digital edition of the newspaper.

Amanda W. Daloisio serves as the co-managing editor of The Catholic Worker.

The development of CatholicWorker.org, a website not officially affiliated with the movement but created by Jim Allaire to serve as a digital hub for Catholic Worker communities. Despite initial skepticism within the movement about embracing technology, platforms like Instagram and Facebook have become avenues for outreach, connecting younger generations with the movement's values of social justice and hospitality.

== Notable contributors ==
Notable figures associated with The Catholic Worker (New York) newspaper include the following:

- Dorothy Day – Founder and editor
- Peter Maurin – Founder and editor
- Ade Bethune – Designed the early masthead
- Ammon Hennacy – 1953 Associate Editor
- Daniel Berrigan – Proclaimed to be a notable figure of the paper
- Fritz Eichenberg – Frequently contributed illustrations
- Jacques Maritain – Proclaimed to be a notable figure of the paper
- Judith Gregory – Dorothy Day's legal executor
- Karl Meyer – Editor and activist
- Micheal Harrington – Editor from 1951 to 1953
- Thomas Merton – Wrote articles about Indigenous peoples in America
- Tom Cornell – Writer and editor, joined in 1953

== Reception ==
The Catholic Worker is considered a Christian anarchist publication.

=== Early reception ===
During the early stages of the Catholic Worker movement, there was some resistance among average Catholics in America to embrace the movement and its said alignment with Church teachings. This sentiment coincided with a broader societal apprehension towards anything resembling Communism, particularly during the era of the Red Scare. Observers, including many Catholics, were skeptical of the Catholic Worker's houses of hospitality, finding it challenging to reconcile the voluntary poverty embraced by its members with traditional Christian teachings.

== See also ==
- Association of Catholic Trade Unionists
- Distributism
- Mutual aid
- Personalism

== Sources ==
- Brock, Barbara L. (2007). "Women in History - Dorothy Day". Journal of Women in Educational Leadership. 5 (2): 87–88.
