= Saint Joseph's House of Hospitality (Pittsburgh) =

Hostel for homeless men in Pennsylvania, US

Coordinates: 40.44492°N 79.98639°W

St. Joseph's House of Hospitality is a home for homeless men in Pittsburgh, Pennsylvania. It was founded in 1937 by the Catholic Radical Alliance on the principles of the Catholic Worker Movement, and is named for St. Joseph the Worker. As a house of hospitality, the homeless are guests of the house, similar to being guests of a family, and they are charged a fee based on a sliding scale. Past resident directors have included Monsignor Charles Owen Rice. During the early 1950s the House, then in Tannehill Street, was managed by Paul J Rudzik, who lived on the premises with his wife and two daughters.

It is operated by Catholic Charities of the Roman Catholic Diocese of Pittsburgh.

There are or were similar houses with the same name in New York City and Rochester, New York.

== See also ==
- Joe Hill House
- Catholic Worker Movement
