= Martin Newell (priest) =

English Roman Catholic priest (born 1967)

The Reverend Martin Newell CP
- Born: Martin John Newell; 11 June 1967; Walthamstow, England
- Occupations: Priest; activist
- Movement: Catholic Worker Movement; Plowshares movement

Ecclesiastical career
- Religion: Christianity (Roman Catholic)
- Church: Latin Church
- Ordained: 1997 (priest)

Martin John Newell CP (born 1967) is an English Catholic priest, anti-war campaigner, social activist and climate change protester. He has been involved with a number of high-profile anti-war protests, such as the Plowshares movement, and climate movements such as Christian Climate Action and Extinction Rebellion. He has served several prison terms for his activism while remaining an active priest of the Passionist congregation. He is a leading proponent of the Catholic Worker Movement in the United Kingdom, being the founder of London Catholic Worker.

== Life and career ==
Martin John Newell was born in Walthamstow in 1967 into an English practising Catholic family. After a Bachelor of Science degree in economics he served with the Jesuit Refugee Service and then with the Ashram Community in Liverpool and the Simon Community in London. These experiences drew him to discover a religious vocation, and he studied for further degrees in philosophy and theology at St John's Seminary, Wonersh. After ordination as a diocesan priest for the Roman Catholic Diocese of Brentwood in 1997 he sought permission to join the semi-monastic Passionists and aimed to combine this lifestyle with anti-war and social activism in association with the Catholic Worker Movement.

=== Activism ===
Newell has been involved in a large number of high-profile anti-war protest actions including the Jubilee Ploughshares group which gained access to aircraft destined for East Timor and disabled them, causing damage in excess of one million pounds; he was sentenced to twelve months imprisonment for this action. In recent years he has been a visible presence on Christian Climate Action protests and Extinction Rebellion events, being arrested on multiple occasions. He has served prison terms in both HM Prison Bedford and HM Prison Belmarsh.

=== Catholic Worker Movement ===
Newell's involvement with the international Catholic Worker Movement led to the founding of its UK incarnation, London Catholic Worker, in 2000, in cooperation with Simon Watson, Scott and Maria Albrecht, Angela Broome and others; later, the first resident "house of hospitality" members consisted of Newell, Steve Barnes and Eddie Jarvis. Australian activist Ciaron O'Reilly later joined the community, and supporters included ex-SAS peace campaigner Ben Griffin and human rights lawyer Gareth Peirce.

== See also ==
- Christian views on environmentalism
