= Bryan Law =

Australian peace activist

Bryan Joseph Law (1954 – April 2013) was an Australian peace activist who became well known after breaking into Pine Gap in 2005 as a passive protest against the Iraq War, and again for breaking into a military base at Rockhampton in 2011 and hammering a hole in a military helicopter prevent it from operating. Law and his wife Margaret Pestorius coordinated the Cairns Peace by Peace organisation. Law also disrupted logging activities on the World Heritage Site Fraser Island.

== Early life ==
Law was born in 1954 in the Brisbane suburb of Moorooka. Both his parents served in the army during World War II, His father in New Guinea and his mother in Townsville. Law attended Yeronga State High School, excelling in the sciences. He attended the University of Queensland, studying chemistry briefly before dropping out. He then worked briefly for the Education Department as a clerk. He subsequently drove taxis for 15 years in Cairns. In his thirties Law returned to Griffith University to study history and politics with a special interest in Asia and Pacific history and regional militarism. He was a campus activist and became President of the Student Union.

== Activism ==
Law was radicalised during the government of Joh Bjelke-Petersen and was first arrested at a large right to march street demonstration in Brisbane. He was arrested more than 30 times. Law blogged widely. He had ambitions to become a lawyer but felt he came from the wrong class at the wrong time. He revelled in the intellectual stimulation offered by the court room process. He was acknowledged by judges, barristers and adversaries as an honourable challenger. Ciaron O’Reilly wrote:

Of the thousands arrested and bashed during that period, some of us remained "beat up but upbeat" turning towards, exploring and sustaining nonviolent resistance against war and war preparations. As some turned towards the U.S. traditions of the Catholic Worker and Berrigans, Law turned to a deep exploration of Gandhi.

In his later years, the Catholic Worker tradition also influenced Law's approach to nonviolence.

Between 1982 and the mid-2000s, Law worked on a range of campaigns and was judged by colleagues as the "foremost nonviolence strategist in Australia." He applied nonviolence theory and techniques to local, regional and national projects. Campaigns he was involved with included Aboriginal rights, which he initially explored about the Brisbane Commonwealth Games in 1982. He lived on Fraser Island during the blockade to interrupt logging. He was involved in local issues such as improving bicycle facilities, the Cairns Yacht Club and most recently the "Save City Place" campaign in Cairns.

He had a keen interest in opposing militarism and this became his primary passion. As an antimilitarist activist, he first opposed visits of US and UK warships to Australia during the Bicentennial. It was during this time he started to explore the power of small-group nonviolence. He teamed up with fellow nonviolent activist Margaret Pestorius and they followed their shared passion of educating ordinary people about the practice of nonviolence. With the Cairns Peace by Peace group, they began citizens' inspections of visiting US warships at a time when Law considered Australia was in a state of perpetual war. In 2005 he entered Pine Gap spy base near Alice Springs with three other people from Christians Against All Terrorism. This action was a turning point in Law's pursuit of more powerful types of activity and ultimately led to his work culminating fittingly in the regional Queensland town of Rockhampton at a time when most looked toward Canberra and Washington for political change. the decision to conduct a ploughshare type action in Rockhampton during the 2011 Talisman Sabre Exercises. This involved damaging an Australian Defence Force helicopter while dressed up as an alter-identity, the Peace Preacher.

== Personal life ==
During the court case in Alice Springs in 2007 he probably had his first heart attack and his health declined consistently from that point. He struggled with diabetes and heart disease and their consequences.

Law and Margaret Pestorius had a son, Joseph.

== See also ==
- List of peace activists
