= Jim Dowling =

Jim Dowling is a self-declared human rights, free speech and anti-war activist from Brisbane, Australia. Together with fellow Catholic Worker activists, Ciaron O'Reilly and Angela Jones, he founded the West End Catholic Worker community in Brisbane during the 1980s. He currently resides at Peter Maurin Farm with his wife, Anne Rampa, and seven children.

== Iraq War Resistance ==
Dowling is the first Australian civilian to attempt a citizen's arrest on a Federal MP. Dowling walked onto the stage of a "Meet The Candidates" meeting in the Dickson electorate and placed Federal member Peter Dutton under "citizen's arrest" for war crimes. Dutton, an ex-Queensland policeman, voted for the invasion of Iraq in 2003.

Dowling made the arrest and called upon the police officer present in the hall to take Dutton into custody until such time as the charges could be heard. In his written statement, Dowling claimed that the invasion of Iraq was a contravention of the United Nations charter. He also charged Dutton with planning, preparation, initiation, or waging a war of aggression or a war in violation of international treaties, agreements or assurances.

Dowling who was arrested following this incident and he was later found guilty of a public nuisance offence. His appeal against this conviction was thrown out of court and he was ordered to pay a $200 fine or face eight days in prison.

On 1 September 2005, members of the Queensland police force arrested Dowling, alleging that he physically assaulted them while attending a public debate between Federal Liberal Member for Dickson Peter Dutton and civil liberties lawyer Terry O'Gorman on a national security identity card. Dowling claimed six policemen dragged him from the meeting, applied painful arm restraining techniques on him and inflicted grievous injuries to him while forcing his face into the concrete floor with their knees on the back of his head. The police then charged him with disturbing the peace and resisting arrest.

In May 2006, Magistrate Kerry McGuiness handed down her decision regarding the charges of obstructing police after two months deliberation. McGuiness ruled that there was no evidence Dowling had committed any breach of the peace or was about to do so on the night of 1 September 2005 when the police arrested him. McGuiness then ruled there was no need to address the issue of whether Dowling had obstructed police, as one could not be convicted of obstructing police if the police had no lawful reason to detain you in the first place.

== Pine Gap Spy Base, Central Australia ==
On Wednesday morning 8 December Jim Dowling as well as Adele Goldie, Bryan Law and Donna Mulhearn (the Pine Gap 4) sought out Pat Hayes, the traditional Arrente caretaker for the Pine Gap area and asked his permission to walk on his land in order to expose the violence of the base which occupied part of that land. No permission had ever been sought or given for Pine Gap to be used by the military. Hayes gave the group permission to enter the area. At dawn on 3 October 2006, the four members of the group which had called itself Christians Against ALL Terrorism entered the spy base to conduct a citizens inspection of the activities and possible war crimes and terrorist activity, in particular the bombing of innocent civilians in Iraq, which were being carried out by a foreign power on Australian soil.

Two members of Christians Against ALL Terrorism, Dowling and Goldie had entered the Pine Gap military base undetected and photographed themselves on the roof of a building before being arrested. Two other members of the group, Donna Mulhearn from Sydney, and Bryan Law from Cairns, went undetected for an hour before being arrested cutting through the last inner fence. The four had walked for several hours through desert terrain. Jessica Morrison from Melbourne and Sean O'Reilly from Brisbane held a peaceful vigil outside the front gates around six that morning. During the vigil, O'Reilly was arrested for hindering police, but later found not guilty in the Alice Springs Magistrates court.

Dowling, Goldie, Law and Mulhearn were charged under the Defence (Special Undertakings) Act 1952. The Act has not been used previously and carries a maximum jail sentence of 7 years, with an additional two years for taking photographs within the base. The four had a three-week Supreme court trial in June 2007 heard by Judge Sally Thomas. The Commonwealth was represented by up to seven lawyers including two QC's. The prosecution started their case by attempting to have the defendants placed under house arrest for the duration of the trial. Judge Thomas rejected this application. But Commonwealth lawyers successfully argued that no evidence would be allowed which was covered by "Public Interest Immunity" legislation or "Parliamentary Privilege". Despite this, the accused attempted to recount the role of Pine Gap in the occupation of Iraq. Mulhearn recounted her personal witness of the deaths caused by Allied bombing in Iraq. She described walking through pools of blood in a Baghdad market place. Some of that blood, she alleged, was still on the boots she wore into court that day. She claimed there was a direct between that blood and the role of Pine Gap in providing targeting information for the bombs that were dropped on that marketplace. Jim Dowling attempted to dramatise the Role of Raytheon Corporation who made all the Cruise Missiles fired on the people of Iraq and also at the Taliban. Raytheon also have the sole contract for all maintenance at Pine Gap and are the largest non-government employer at the Base. After five hours the jury found the Pine Gap 4, including Dowling, guilty of all charges. Judge Sally Thomas declined to send them to jail, rejecting strong demands from the prosecution to do so. She fined them a total of $3300 between them plus $10,000 damages. All have so far refused to pay. After the trial the prosecution launched an appeal against the leniency of the sentences in another attempt to have the Pine Gap4 jailed. They were later acquitted by a unanimous decision of the full bench of the Northern Territory Court of Criminal Appeal.

== Protest against Raytheon Australia ==
Along with Dr. Lisa Bridle, Dowling was arrested during a protest against the military contractor Raytheon Australia, during which members of Christians Against All Terrorism performed an exorcism and painted a cross on the wall with blood.

== Protest at the Toowong War Memorial ==
On Ash Wednesday (1 March) 2017, Dowling was arrested with fellow Catholic Worker activists for removing a sword from a Cross of Sacrifice at the Toowong War Memorial and beating it into the shape of a garden hoe (plowshare).

== Boeing Protests ==
In April 2026 Jim attended a weekly action against the weapons manufacturers Boeing, in the Brisbane CBD. He held a banner with a phrase recently made illegal the say in QLD. It said "from the... sea, Brisbane will be free of Boeing." He was arrested and plead insanity at his court mention later that month, saying he thinks the charges are insane.
