= Servants to Asia's Urban Poor =

Servants to Asia’s Urban Poor is an international network of Christian communities living and working in the slums of Asia, participating with the poor in the hope of seeing those neighborhoods flourish with peace, love and joy of God's Kingdom. Servants is an organic movement, body, family and community, rather than a traditional mission organization, charity, or NGO.

Servants was established by Viv Grigg, a missionary working in Manila in the early 1980s. He became the first missionary in Manila to choose to live in a slum, renting a room in the squatter settlement of Tatalon. Now Servants has teams in the Philippines, Cambodia, Indonesia, and India. Servants also has sending offices in North America, New Zealand, Switzerland, and the Philippines.

Servants seeks to build partnerships and networks with individuals, churches, NGOs, government agencies and missions who share a similar concern for the urban poor. Servants approaches this with sensitivity, listening and learning where God is already at work in people's lives and communities, and then joining him in that work. Because Servants live and work with the poor, they have a deeper understanding of the local language and culture. Servants recognizes that the poor have resources of their own (such as ideas, skills, and energies) to contribute to transformation, and that true sustainable transformation will only come when these resources have been mobilized. Rather than building an institution, Servants aims to raise up local disciples and leaders to equip the body of Christ.

== Five Principles & Five Values ==
Servants adheres to five principles and five values. The principles are:

Incarnation - LIVING WITH THE POOR

We live with the urban poor, learning from them, building relationships, participating in their lives and struggles, learning their language and their culture, and working out how Jesus’ love can be shown in their context.

Community - WORKING WITH PEOPLE, NOT JUST FOR THEM

As well as a commitment to the communities we move into, we have a passion to work together in supportive teams that model the love, care and community that Jesus spoke of. We work with people, not just for them

Wholism - SPEAKING GRACE & PROMOTING JUSTICE

We want to see the good news of Jesus proclaimed in word, deed and power. We have a God who is working to renew all things and to restore wholeness of life to all creation. Our lives amongst the poor call us to care for individuals, families and communities, as well as for the structures and systems of human society and the environment on which we all depend. We work for justice, proclaim God’s grace, and lift all things to Him in prayer.

Servanthood - EMPOWERING NOT OVERPOWERING

Servants seek to follow Jesus who came in humility ‘not to be served but to serve'. We empower the poor by placing control in their hands and not overpowering them with outside resources or expertise. With courage, we embrace sacrifice and suffering, share faithfully in the life of Jesus and the poor.

Simplicity - SETTING ASIDE AFFLUENCE AND COMFORT

They commit themselves to lifestyles of inner and outward simplicity, in order to be free to love and serve the poor. They set aside their ‘right’ to affluence as they believe there are still those who live in abject poverty. They aim to be a relevant prophetic voice in a world which they believe is preoccupied with self.

Servants are sustained by five values:

Grace - CARRIED BY GOD'S EXTRAVAGANT LOVE

"All that we do and are is rooted and sustained by God’s lavish, unearned love, favor and forgiveness towards us. This profound grace delivers us from unhealthy striving, competition and condemnation of ourselves or judgment of others."

Celebration - PAUSING TO PARTY AND MARK MILESTONES

"Directing our celebrations to God in worship, we look for excuses to throw parties, consciously marking every milestone and achievement – no matter how small! We want to be people of generosity, who refuse to take ourselves too seriously."

Beauty - NOTICING GOD'S FINGERPRINTS

"In our lives, in our homes, in our communities and in our world, we honor God and renew our souls by recognizing and creating beauty. In particular, we want to see and celebrate the beauty inherent in ourselves and in each other. We acknowledge the beauty of God’s creation and understand that God has entrusted us with the responsibility to work for its care and protection"

Creativity - DANCING WITH THE CREATOR'S SPIRIT

"By allowing our senses, our imaginations, our minds and bodies to fulfill their God-given potentials for creativity, we glorify God. We believe it does our souls good (and pleases God) when we create, through writing and storytelling, poetry, cooking, music, painting and other art forms."

Rest - BEING STILL, BEING REFRESHED

"God calls us to regular rhythms of work, rest and reflection – weekly Sabbaths and regular holy-days (holidays). We seek to obey God’s command to rest to be refreshed, to be still and to deepen our relationship with him and one another."

== Similar Christian Movements ==
- New Friars
- New Monasticism-related communities
- Catholic Worker Movement
- Madonna House Apostolate

== See also ==
- Missionaries of Charity, Mother Teresa of Calcutta's community serving the poorest of the poor throughout the world.
