= Barry O'Toole =

The Reverend Barry O'Toole OSB

1st President of Fu Jen Catholic University
- In office 1925–1929
- Succeeded by: Chen Yuan (historian)

Personal details
- Born: 1886 Toledo, Ohio, U.S.
- Died: 26 March 1944 Washington, D.C., U.S.
- Education: St. John College, Toledo, Ohio

George Barry O'Toole, OSB (11 Dec 1886 – 26 March 1944) was an American Catholic priest and activist. He was a member of the Benedictines and a founding member of the Catholic Radical Alliance.

== Career ==
He was important for clarifying the right of Catholics to conscientious objector status. He began his religious career as a parish priest and as a U.S. Army chaplain in World War I.

=== Education career ===
He taught philosophy at both St. Vincent College, Latrobe, Pennsylvania and Seton Hill College. He was the first president (rector) of the Catholic University of Peking. He also was the head of the Philosophy department at Duquesne University.

== Labor activities ==
He was a founding member of the Catholic Radical Alliance, an early labor support organization in Pittsburgh, Pennsylvania with two other priests, Charles Owen Rice and Carl Hensler. He was important to the foundation of St. Joseph's House of Hospitality, also in Pittsburgh.

== Pacifist activities ==
In 1939, he stated that a just war was nearly impossible, because the "modern abuse of universal conscription" made wars on so gigantic a scale as to be unjustifiable. Later he testified before a Senate hearing in opposition to the Burke-Wadsworth Act, a conscription act pending before Congress in 1940.

== Creationism ==
O'Toole was the author of the creationist book The Case Against Evolution (1925). The book was dismissed by academics as a "religious and not a scientific work".

Science writer Martin Gardner noted that O'Toole endorsed the "naive criticism of strata chronology" from creationist George McCready Price.

== Publications ==
- George Barry O'Toole (1925). The Case Against Evolution. The Macmillan Company.
- Ch'ien-li Ying and George Barry O'Toole (1929). The Nestorian Tablet at Sianfu: A New English Translation of the Inscription and a History of the Stone. Peking Leader Press, Peking.
- George Barry O'Toole. (1929). John of Montecorvino, First Archbishop of Peking. Latrobe, Pennsylvania.
- George Barry O'Toole and Quianli Ying (1931). Luo ji xue: Zhong Ying dui zhao. Beijing. OCLC 26088581.
- George Barry O'Toole and Theodore Jeske-Choinski (1936). The Last Romans "Ostatni Rzymianie": A Tale of the Time of Theodosius the Great. Pittsburgh, Pennsylvania.
- George Barry O'Toole (1941). War and Conscription at the Bar of Christian Morals. Catholic Worker Press.
- Bishop Joseph M. Corrigan and George Barry O'Toole, editors (1944). Racism and Christianity; Race: Nation: Person. Social Aspects of the Race Problem, A Symposium. Barnes & Noble, Inc., New York. OCLC 150690057.

Academic offices
Preceded by none	President of Fu Jen Catholic University; 1925–1929	Succeeded by Chen Yuan (historian)
