= Hensler =

Hensler is a surname. Notable people with the surname include:

- Carl Hensler (1898–1984), American Roman Catholic priest
- Deborah Hensler (born 1942), American academic and researcher
- Jenni Hensler, American creative director and artist
- Karl Friedrich Hensler (1759–1825), Dramatist and theatre manager
- Leszek Hensler (1956–2015), Polish field hockey player
- Logan Hensler (born 2006), American ice hockey player
- Paul G. Hensler, American screenwriter and actor
- Rebecca Hensler, American HIV/AIDs activist
