= Saint Vincent Seminary =

Fourth-oldest Catholic seminary in the United States

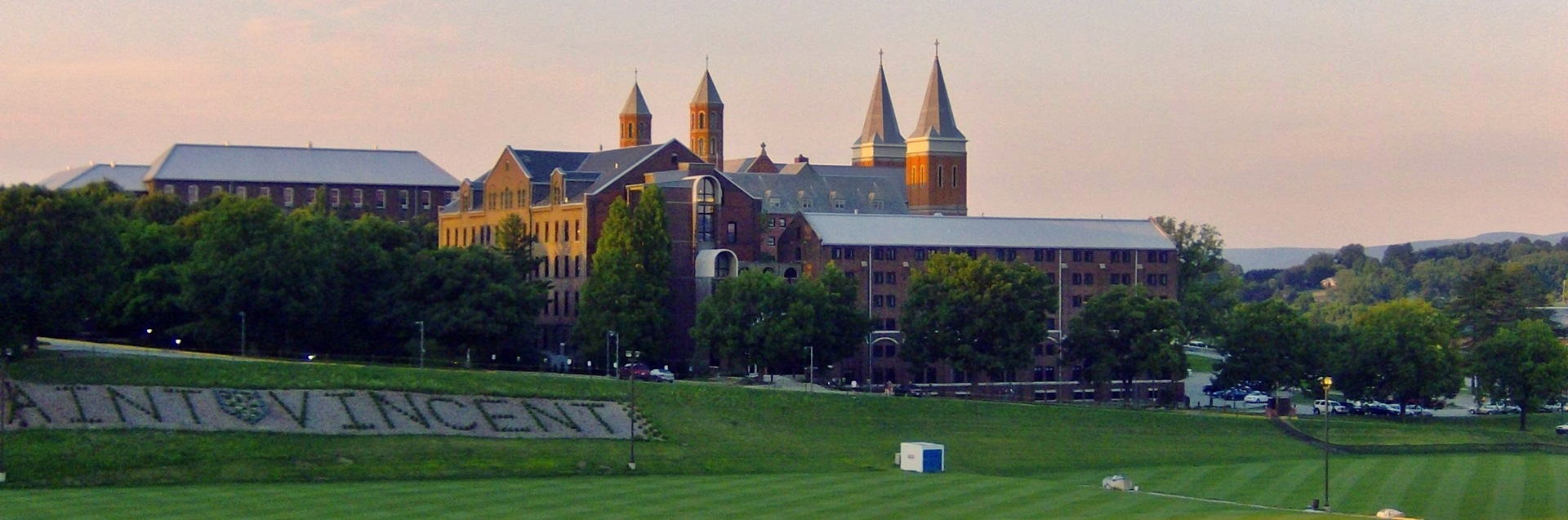
- Saint Vincent's Basilica Panorama
- Type: Seminary
- Established: 1846; 180 years ago
- Founders: Boniface Wimmer
- Religious affiliation: Catholic
- Location: Unity Township, Pennsylvania, United States; 40.292751°N 79.408943°W
- Website: Official website
- Location in Pennsylvania

Saint Vincent Seminary is a Catholic seminary in Unity Township, Pennsylvania, United States,, with a Latrobe, Pennsylvania mailing address. It was founded by Boniface Wimmer in 1846, who established Saint Vincent Archabbey as the first Benedictine monastery in North America. It is the fourth oldest Catholic seminary in the United States.

The seminary was officially established on August 24, 1855, through an Apostolic Brief of Pope Pius IX. Civil degrees are conferred by virtue of a charter granted by an act of the Pennsylvania State Legislature on April 18, 1870. Since 1870, over 300 students have earned the Master of Arts degree and 400 Master of Divinity degrees. More than 2,400 diocesan and religious students have been ordained priests.

== Notable alumni ==
- James Renshaw Cox, priest of the Diocese of Pittsburgh, called the city's "Pastor of the Poor" and 1932 Jobless Party candidate for President of the United States
- Carl P. Hensler, priest of the Diocese of Pittsburgh, labor activist, co-founder of the Catholic Radical Alliance
- George Mundelein, Archbishop of Chicago (1916–1939)
- Rembert Weakland, Archbishop Emeritus of Milwaukee
- René Henry Gracida, Bishop of Corpus Christi (1983–1997)
- Charles Owen Rice, priest of the Diocese of Pittsburgh, social activist, co-founder of the Catholic Radical Alliance
- Douglas Robert Nowicki, Archabbot of St. Vincent Archabbey
