= Joe Hill House =

Catholic Worker Movement house in Utah

Coordinates: 40.731769°N 111.89392°W

Mural of Joe Hill being executed beneath a Crucifixion scene.

The Joe Hill House was a Catholic Worker Movement house of hospitality in Salt Lake City, Utah co-founded in 1961 by Ammon Hennacy and Mary Lathrop. Providing social services and housing to the homeless, the Joe Hill House operated until 1968.

Ammon Hennacy stated that the two rules of the Joe Hill House were "No drinking and no cops.".

One of the prominent features of the Joe Hill House was an enormous twelve feet by fifteen foot mural of IWW songwriter Joe Hill and Jesus Christ, painted by Mary Lathrop.

American radical folk singer Utah Phillips worked at the Joe Hill House for eight years where he was introduced by Ammon Hennacy to Christian pacifism and Christian anarchism. The Joe Hill House of Hospitality was rebuilt by Hal Noakes and John Chanonat, editor of the Utah Free Press who was deported in 1970. The Joe Hill House was then located to 1462 S 4th W, two blocks away from the Vitro smokestack. Just before the death of Ammon Hennacy, it was closed by the Utah Migrant Council.
