= Ammon Hennacy =

American Christian pacifist, anarchist, and social activist (1893–1970)

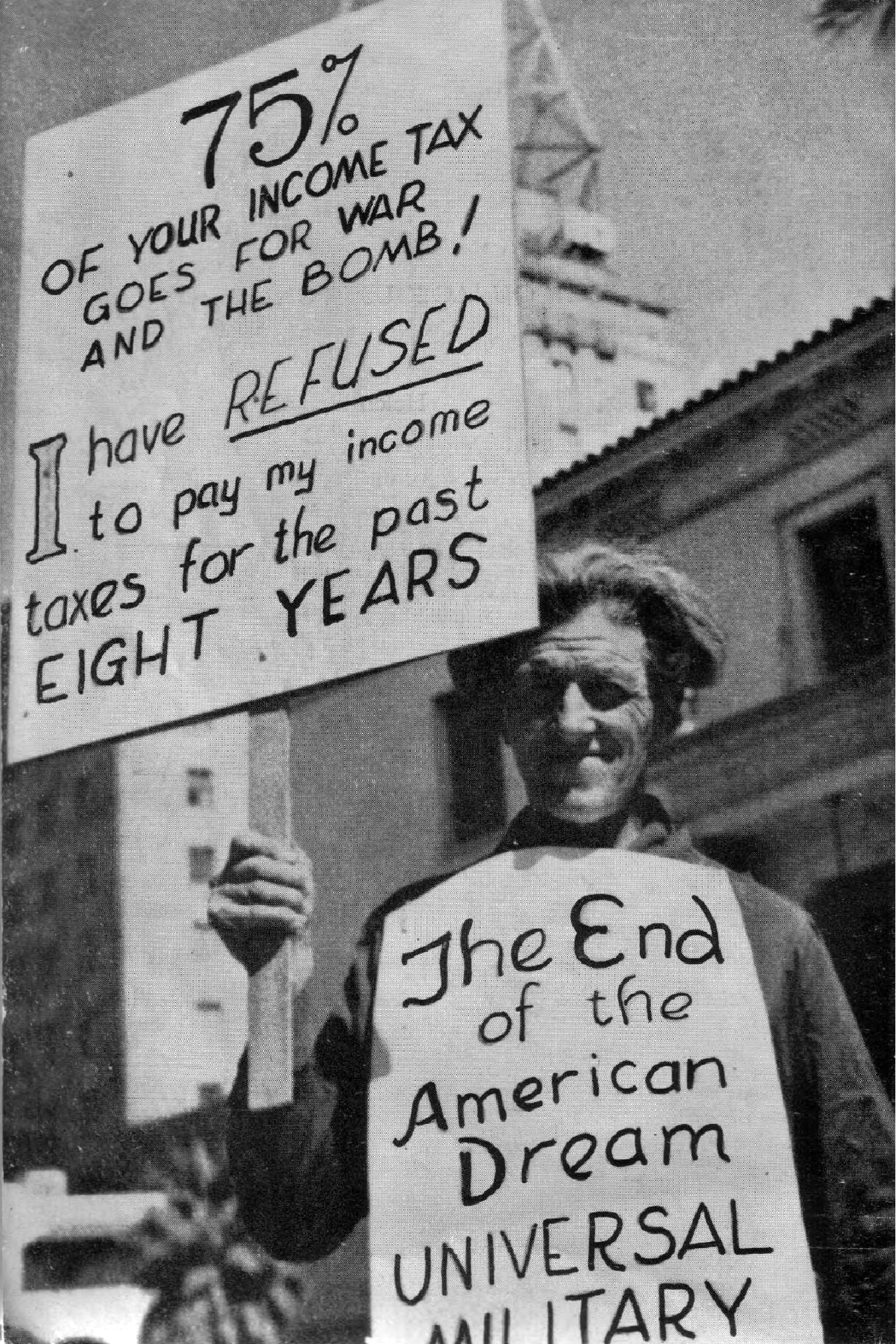
- Hennacy in 1954. Photographer Rik Anderson.
- Born: July 24, 1893; Negley, Ohio, US
- Died: January 14, 1970 (aged 76); Salt Lake City, Utah, US
- Resting place: Waldheim Cemetery, Chicago, Illinois, US
- Education: Hiram College (no degree); University of Wisconsin–Madison (no degree); Ohio State University (no degree); Rand School of Social Science
- Spouses: Selma Melms (m. 1919; div. 1964); Joan Thomas (m. 1965)

Ammon Ashford Hennacy (July 24, 1893 – January 14, 1970) was an American Christian pacifist, anarchist, Wobbly, social activist, and member of the Catholic Worker Movement. He established the Joe Hill House of Hospitality in Salt Lake City, Utah, and practiced tax resistance.

== Biography ==
Hennacy was born in Negley, Ohio, to Quaker parents, Benjamin Franklin Hennacy and Eliza Eunice Fitz Randolph, and grew up as a Baptist. He studied at three different institutions, (a year at each one): Hiram College in Ohio in 1913, University of Wisconsin–Madison in 1914, and Ohio State University in 1915.

During this time, Hennacy was a card-carrying member of the Socialist Party of America and in his words "took military drills in order to learn how to kill capitalists." He was also the secretary of Hiram College's Intercollegiate Socialist Society.

At the outbreak of World War I, Hennacy was imprisoned for two years in Atlanta, Georgia, for resisting conscription. While in prison the only book he was allowed was the Bible. This inspired him to radically depart from his earlier beliefs; he became a Christian pacifist and a Christian anarchist. He led a hunger strike and was punished with eight months in solitary confinement.

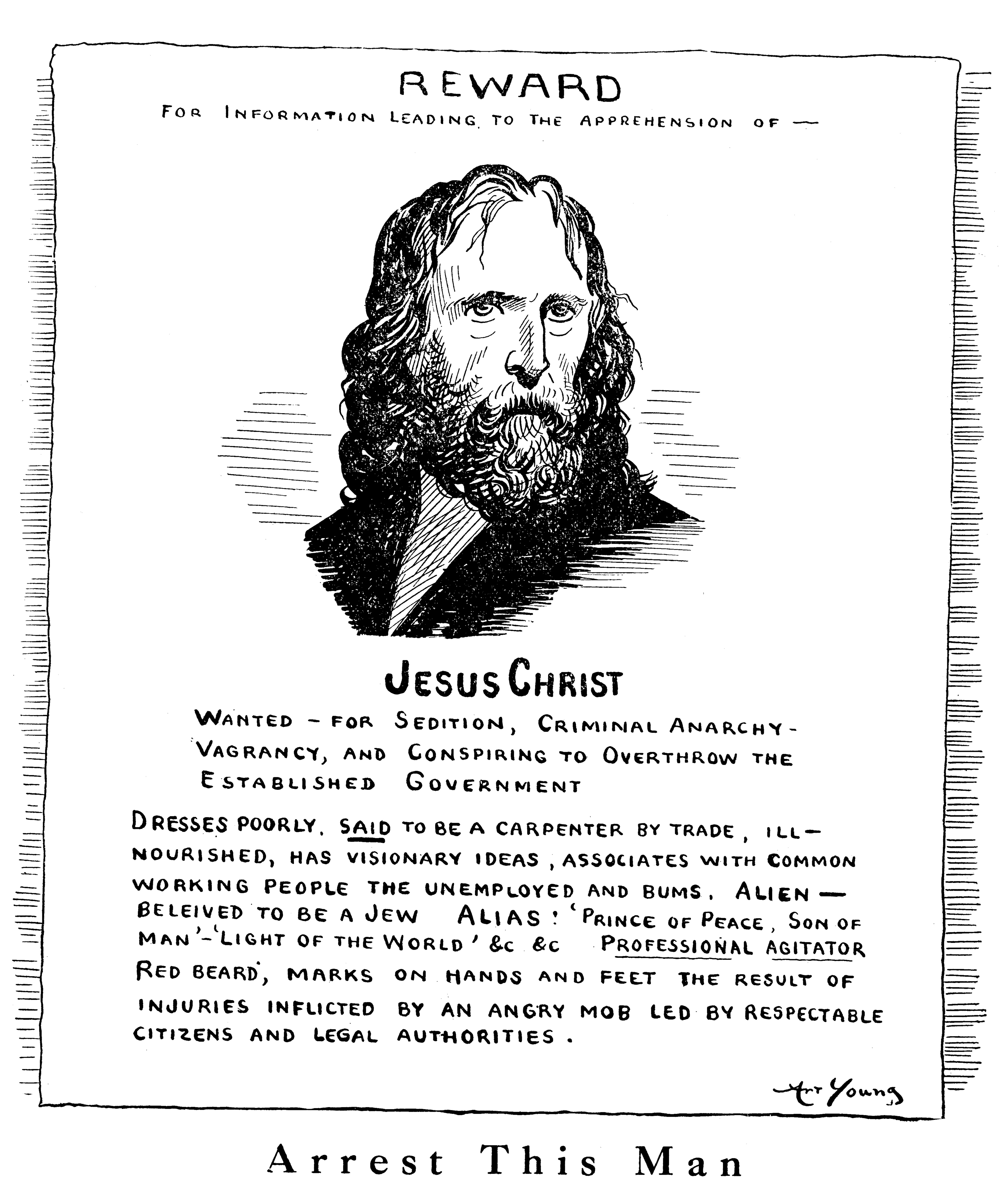
Cartoon by Art Young, first published in The Masses in 1917 and later reprinted in Ammon Hennacy's autobiography

In 1919, Hennacy married his first wife, Selma Melms, under common law. He later described her as the "daughter of the Socialist sheriff of Milwaukee, leader of the Yipsels (YPSL), as the Young People's Socialist League (1907) was called, and secretary to the President of the State Federation of Labor."

In May 1920, Hennacy graduated from the socialist Rand School of Social Science.

In 1952, he was baptized as a Roman Catholic by Father Marion Casey at St. Anastasia Church, with Dorothy Day as his godmother. Hennacy moved to New York City in 1953, and became the associate editor of the Catholic Worker newspaper. Hennacy engaged in many picketing protests while in New York. At that time, he wrote a critical review of Witness, the memoir of Whittaker Chambers, and later wrote more about his dislike of Chambers, whose wife Esther Shemitz his first wife Selma and he had known through the Rand School of Social Science.

In 1961, Hennacy moved to Utah and organised the Joe Hill House of Hospitality in Salt Lake City. While in Utah, Hennacy fasted and picketed in protest of the death penalty and the use of taxes in war. Following a divorce from Selma in 1964, Hennacy married his second wife, Joan Thomas, in 1965. In the same year he left the Roman Catholic Church, though he continued to call himself a "non-church Christian". He was a member of the Industrial Workers of the World.

He wrote about his reasons for leaving and his thoughts on Catholicism, which included his belief that "Paul spoiled the message of Christ" (see Jesusism). He wrote about this in The Book of Ammon in 1965 (an updated version of his 1954 Autobiography of a Catholic Anarchist), which has been praised for its "diamonds of insight and wisdom" but criticised for its rambling style.

In 1968, Hennacy closed the "Joe Hill House of Hospitality" and turned his attention to further protest and writing. His second and last book, The One-Man Revolution in America, was published in 1970 and consists of seventeen chapters with each one devoted to an American radical. These included Thomas Paine, William Lloyd Garrison, John Woolman, Dorothy Day, Eugene Debs, Malcolm X, Mother Jones, Clarence Darrow, and Albert Parsons.

Ammon Hennacy died from a heart attack on January 14, 1970. His funeral was held at Our Lady of Lourdes Catholic Church in Salt Lake City. In accordance with his wishes, his body was cremated and the ashes scattered over the graves of the Haymarket anarchists in Waldheim Cemetery in Chicago.

== Political and ethical beliefs ==
Ammon Hennacy was a pacifist, a Christian anarchist, and an advocate of anarchism and nonresistance. He was extremely critical of what he described as the "institutional church" and state capitalism.

Hennacy never paid federal income taxes because they pay for the military and war. He lived a life of voluntary simplicity and believed in what he called his "One-Man Revolution" against violence, sin, and coercion. He also refused to accept the legitimacy of the judiciary. Dorothy Day said "Tolstoi and Gandhi, and Jesus became his teachers".

== Influence on folk ==
When Ani DiFranco gathered stories by Utah Phillips to make the 1996 album The Past Didn't Go Anywhere, she included his story about Hennacy, under the title "Anarchy". Hennacy helped shape Phillips, who often told this story.

== Bibliography ==
- Hennacy, Ammon (1954). The Autobiography of a Catholic Anarchist. New York: Catholic Worker Books. Complete e-text, free eBook.
- Hennacy, Ammon (1970). The Book of Ammon. Complete e-text, free eBook.
- Hennacy, Ammon (2012). The One-Man Revolution in America. Wipf and Stock. ISBN 978-1-62032-317-5.

== See also ==
- Christian vegetarianism
- List of peace activists
