= Dave Andrews (activist) =

Australian Christian anarchist

- Born: 20 May 1951 (age 75); England
- Occupations: writer, speaker
- Partner: Ange
- Writing career
- Genre: Christian theology
- Subject: Christian anarchy
- Movement: Emerging church
- Website: daveandrews.com.au

David Frank Andrews (born 20 May 1951) is an Australian Christian anarchist author, speaker, social activist, community worker, and a key figure in the Waiters' Union, an inner city Christian community network working with Aboriginals, refugees and people with disabilities in Brisbane, Australia. Andrews has been an educator at large for TEAR Australia, a Christian international aid and development agency; a teacher for Christian Heritage College; and a trainer for the Community Praxis Cooperative. He is the author of twenty non-fiction books including Christi-Anarchy, in which he calls for a total deconstruction and reconstruction of Christianity, community and society. He has been described as a "prophet" by both Mike Riddell and Rowland Croucher. Andrews is married to wife Ange and the father of Evonne and Navi and grandfather of Lila and Kaedin, Jaxon and Leonardo. Andrews is currently a full-time career for his wife who has dementia.

== Biography ==
=== From England to Australia to India ===
Born in England, Andrews grew up the son of a Baptist pastor in Queensland, Australia. After spending time in Afghanistan, he went to India with his wife Ange and stayed from 1972 until 1984. In 1973, Dave and Ange and their friends started a residential community called Dilaram in New Delhi and then in 1975 started another intentional community called Aashiana out of which grew Sahara, Sharan and Sahasee–three well-known Christian community organisations working with slum dwellers, sex workers, drug addicts, and people with HIV/AIDS. Present in that country at the time of the assassination of Indira Gandhi in 1984, Andrews helped protect Sikhs from the backlash that ensued through non-violent intervention. David Engwicht claims that Andrews and a friend "put themselves between an armed mob and a Sikh family and saved them from certain death." Andrews and his wife were forced to leave that year.

Excommunication, Reflection, Action

Andrews was excommunicated by the International Council of Youth with a Mission who had acquired Dilaram.a The reasoning, according to Andrews, was that "I was a rebel and, as an unrepentant rebel, would be summarily excommunicated," and that "it 'was what the Lord told' them to do." Andrews described the aftermath as devastating: "I became suicidal because all the significant people I turned to denounced me, no one else would speak to me, and the people who had promised to protect me ended up having psychological breakdowns. One guy was taken away to an asylum." Andrews has stated that he and his wife committed themselves to a creative, constructive course of reflection and action and experienced "a profound level of healing" over the next five to ten years. Andrews also developed his distinctive approach to Christianity which he called "Christi-Anarchy", which critiqued top-down hierarchical structures and advocated bottom-up self-managed other-orientated Christ-like community development processes.

=== The West End Waiters' Union ===
Dave and Ange returned to Australia with their daughters Evonne and Navi, they were employed by Queensland Baptist Care. Dave and Ange and their friends founded The Waiters' Union as a network of spiritually minded activists who work with marginalised and disadvantaged people in West End. The Waiters' Union is a network of residents living in the locality working towards community with all people, particularly trying to include those who tend to be excluded. The Waiters' Union are involved in multiple formal and non-formal activities, including a Community Meal they have hosted every fortnight for the last twenty-five years, to which local people are invited. Many of these activities are listed in the Waiters' Union website at www.waitersunion.org. These activities try to encourage a culture of radical compassion, reciprocal support and mutual accountability.

=== Empathic Interfaith Engagement ===
After 9/11 exploded Andrews became alarmed at the way Christians were demonising Muslims in the lead up to invasions of Iraq and Afghanistan. So he went to the local mosque and said ‘Christians, Muslims and Jews all believe Abraham is the father of our faith, and we all believe our God is the God of Abraham. So rather than let the press play us off against each other, why don’t we show our unity by coming together for prayer. And to start that process, why don’t I come and pray with you at the mosque on Friday?’ Sure, they said. So he did.

About that time Andrews met Nora Amath, the Chair of AMARAH (Australian Muslim Advocates for the Rights of All Humanity), and they talked about what they could do to re-build the bridges between our communities that the extremists were blowing up. They started by deciding to simply fast and pray together during Ramadan and invite Christians and Muslims to break the fast by eating a meal together to talk to each other about what prayer and fasting meant to them. This was the beginning of a series of empathic interfaith engagements they organized on the basis of four common sacred beliefs: That there is only One God - The God of Abraham; 2. That Our God is a God of Mercy and Grace; That God is bigger than our religions and can speak to us through one another’s traditions; And last but least, that all truth is God’s truth, regardless of who speaks it, and we need to hear it.

Over the last few years Andrews fasted and prayed during Ramadan with his Muslim friends and, based on those conversations, he has written two collections of Christian-Muslim interfaith reflections. One is on the Bismillah- ‘Bismillahi r Rahman r Rahim’ - the invocation at the beginning of each sura in the Qur'an, which encourages us to work ‘In the name of God the most merciful, most gracious and most compassionate". The other is on Isa (or Jesus) whom Andrews and Amath believe embodies the Spirit of the Bismillah, and whose Be-Attitudes in the Beatitudes provide the framework for all their work.

In order to address the violence against Muslims in Brisbane, following the backlash against the rise of the so-called Islamic State, on Friday 26 September 2014. Andrews and Amath organised a very significant meeting of local Christian leaders who publicly affirmed their solidarity with the local Muslim communities at the Kuraby Mosque.

=== Elder ===
As he has aged, Andrews has sought to be an elder. For Andrews eldering may or may not be 'religious' but is always 'spiritual' – helping people get in touch with the 'Spirit of compassion'. He facilitates peer support groups not only with local clergy, but also with disenchanted community activists alienated from religious institutions.

=== The Jihad Of Jesus ===
Within the context of his community work in which he connected regularly within interfaith networks, Andrews' interactions within the Muslim community led to a great deal of concern about the rising tide of anti-Islamic sentiment. Not content to simply sit and be uninformed, he spent significant time in study and in intentional conversation with Muslims, seeking to understand the true heart of his Islamic neighbours religion. The outcome of this work resulted in The Jihad of Jesus (2015).

Met with some controversy in both Islamic and Christian circles, the book introduces the idea that "jihad" - which for many has been popularised as a call to 'holy war' - could in fact be interpreted through the "strong-but-gentle" approach of Jesus in whom both Christians and Muslims can find common ground. This alternate view interprets the concept of "jihad" not as a holy war, but as a sacred and nonviolent struggle for justice; reframing the word in what Andrews believes to be the true essence of its use in the Qur'an. The book has been promoted as "...a 'do-it-yourself' Guide for all Christians and Muslims who want to...struggle for justice and peace nonviolently side by side."

== Bibliography ==
- Can You Hear the Heartbeat?: A Challenge to Care the Way Jesus Cared with David Engwicht. London: Hodder & Stoughton, 1989. ISBN 0340510633
- Building a Better World: Developing Communities of Hope in Troubled Times. Sutherland: Albatross Books, 1996. ISBN 0824517261
- Christi-Anarchy: Discovering a Radical Spirituality of Compassion. Oxford: Lion Publishing, 1999. Eugene: Wipf & Stock, 2012. ISBN 1610978528
- Not Religion, But Love: Practising a Radical Spirituality of Compassion. Oxford: Lion Publishing, 2001. Eugene: Wipf & Stock, 2012. ISBN 161097851X
- Compassionate Community Work: An Introductory Course for Christians. Carlisle: Piquant Editions, 2006. ISBN 1903689368
- Plan Be: Be the Change You Want to See in the World. Milton Keynes: Authentic Media, 2008. ISBN 1850787786
- People of Compassion. Melbourne: TEAR, 2008. Eugene: Wipf & Stock, 2012. ISBN 1610978552
- Hey, Be and See: We Can be the Change We Want to See in the World. Milton Keynes: Authentic Media, 2009. ISBN 1850788480
- See What I Mean?: See the Change We Can be in the World. Milton Keynes: Authentic Media, 2009. ISBN 1850788472
- A Divine Society: The Trinity, Community and Society. Brisbane: Frank, 2009. Eugene: Wipf & Stock, 2012. ISBN 1610978560
- Learnings: Lessons We Are Learning about Living Together. Brisbane: Frank, 2010. Eugene: Wipf & Stock, 2012. ISBN 1610978536
- Bearings: Getting Our Bearings Again in the Light of the Gospel. Brisbane: Frank, 2010. Eugene: Wipf & Stock, 2012. ISBN 1610978544
- "Bismillah - Christian-Muslim Ramadan Reflections" Melbourne: Mosaic, 2011 ISBN 978-1743240915
- Down Under: In-Depth Community Work Melbourne: Mosaic, 2012 ISBN 9781743241226
- Out And Out: Way-Out Community Work Melbourne: Mosaic, 2012 ISBN 9781743241356
- "Isa- Christian-Muslim Ramadan Reflections" Melbourne: Mosaic, 2013 ISBN 9781743241165
- "The Jihad of Jesus - The Sacred Nonviolent Struggle For Justice" Eugene: Wipf and Stock, 2015 ISBN 978-1-4982-1774-3
- To Right Every Wrong: The Making and Unmaking Of An Improbable Minor Prophet. Eugene: Wipf & Stock, 2021. ISBN 1725288532.

== See also ==
- Anarchism in Australia
