= Catholic Radical Alliance =

Achievements of the Catholic Radical Alliance of 1937

The Catholic Radical Alliance was founded in Pittsburgh, Pennsylvania, in 1937 by the Roman Catholic priests Charles Owen Rice, Carl Hensler, and George Barry O'Toole, with the approval of their bishop, Hugh C. Boyle. It supported the unionization of workers in the H. J. Heinz Company and the Loose Wiles Biscuit Company in Pittsburgh. In addition to union activities, it founded a house of hospitality, St. Joseph's, which is still active as of 2018. It disassociated itself from the Catholic Worker Movement during the Second World War, over a disagreement with the Catholic Worker's pacifist stance.
