= Charles Owen Rice =

American labor activist and Catholic priest

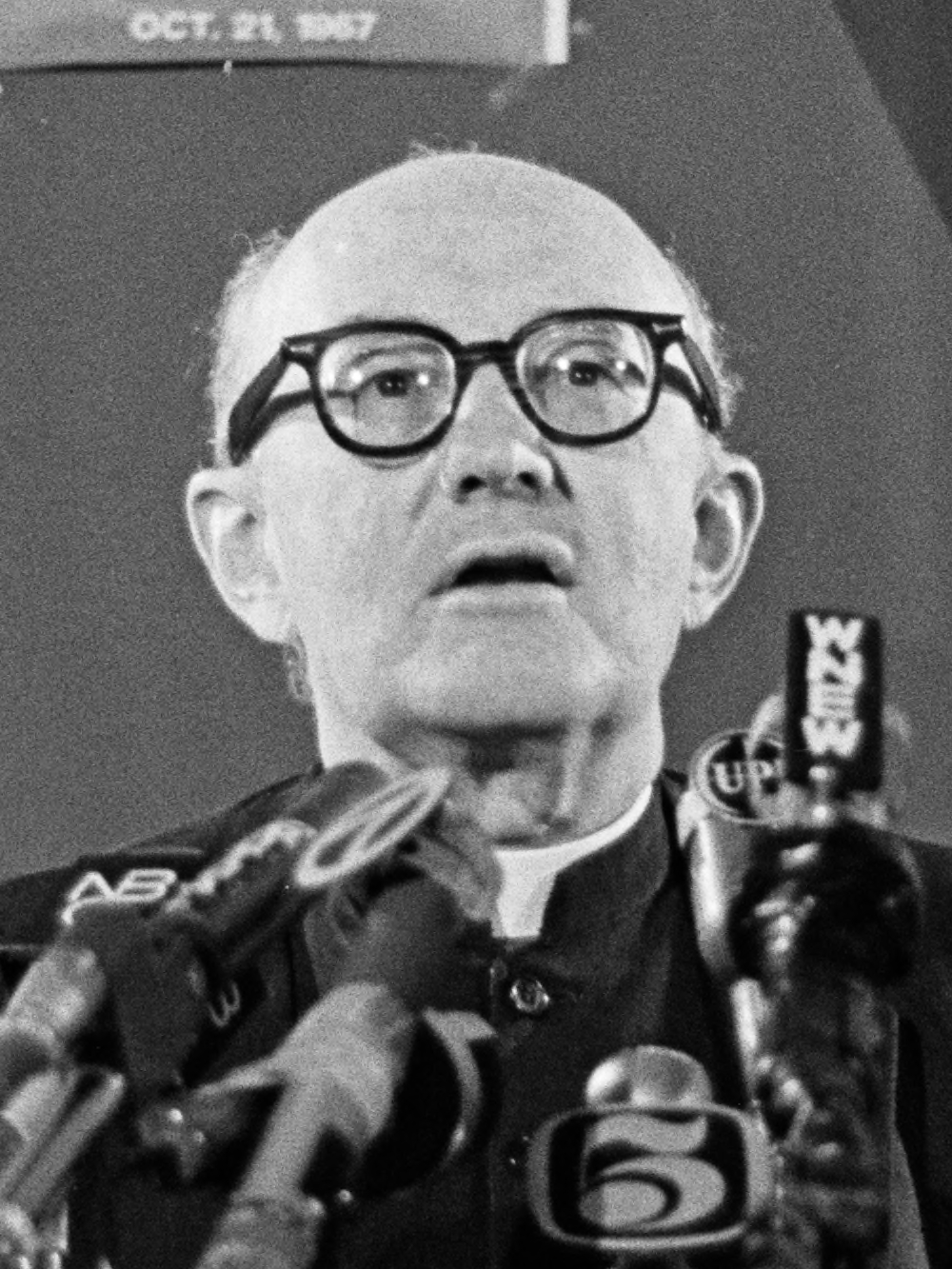
- Rice in 1967
- Born: November 21, 1908; Brooklyn, New York, U.S.
- Died: November 13, 2005 (aged 96); McCandless, Pennsylvania, U.S.
- Education: Duquesne University; Saint Vincent Seminary
- Occupations: Catholic priest, labor organizer
- Known for: Activism

Charles Owen Rice (November 21, 1908 – November 13, 2005) was a Catholic priest and an American labor activist.

== Background ==
Rice was born in Brooklyn, New York, to Irish immigrants. His mother died when he was four, and he and his brother were sent to Ireland to be raised by his paternal grandmother, in a large extended family home along the seafront in Bellurgan, County Louth. Seven years later he returned to the United States.

In 1934, after studies at Duquesne University and Saint Vincent Seminary, he was ordained into the priesthood. He served in the Diocese of Pittsburgh, Pennsylvania for seven decades. His brother Patrick (died 1971) was also an ordained priest in Pittsburgh and a canon lawyer. His cousin, also called Patrick Rice (June 1918 – June 8, 2010), was an ordained priest in Dublin and similarly elevated to the Canonry.

== Contributions in Pittsburgh ==
In 1937, Rice founded St. Joseph's House of Hospitality with two other Roman Catholic priests, Carl Hensler and George Barry O'Toole. Also that year, the three priests formed the Catholic Radical Alliance.

During the Great Depression, Rice began his activism in social causes and especially in the American labor movement. Rice was mentored by Pittsburgh's original labor priest Father James Cox, and as a leader of the Catholic Radical Alliance, was involved in strikes against the H.J. Heinz Company.

He met Dorothy Day and was a friend of Philip Murray, founder of the Steel Workers Organizing Committee and president of the Congress of Industrial Organizations.

Rice helped form the Association of Catholic Trade Unionists. From 1937 to 1969, Rice held a weekly radio program on which he often discussed the labor movement, communism, and St. Joseph's House. Rice was appointed rent director of the Hill District during World War II.

During seven decades of priesthood, Rice was pastor of Pittsburgh-area congregations including St. Joseph's in Natrona, Immaculate Conception in Washington, Holy Rosary in Homewood, and St. Anne's in Castle Shannon.

== Later years ==
For many years, Rice was a columnist for the Pittsburgh Catholic. Rice was an early organizer and contributor to National Mobilization Committee to End the War in Vietnam, a coalition of antiwar activists, participating in the initial Spring Mobilization to End the War in Vietnam demonstrations, held in New York City in April 1967. He opposed America's involvement in the Vietnam War in 1969, and supported workers in Pittsburgh when they lost their jobs and livelihood as the steel industry closed in the 1980s.

== Books ==
- Heineman, Kenneth J. (1999). A Catholic New Deal: Religion and Reform in Depression Pittsburgh. University Park: The Pennsylvania State University Press. ISBN 0-271-01895-X.
- Rice, Charles Owen (1996). Fighter With a Heart: Writings of Charles Owen Rice, Pittsburgh Labor Priest. Pittsburgh: University of Pittsburgh Press. ISBN 0-8229-5619-5.
- McGeever, Patrick J. (1989). Rev. Charles Owen Rice: apostle of contradiction. Pittsburgh, PA: Duquesne University Press. ISBN 0-8207-0209-9.
