= Ciaron O'Reilly =

- Born: 1960 (age 65–66); Brisbane, Australia
- Website: http://ciaron.allotherplaces.org/

Ciaron O'Reilly (born 1960) is an Australian social justice and anti-war campaigner, peace protester, and Catholic Worker, having, as the book Christian Anarchism put it: "engaged in ... protests, acts of civil disobedience and trials in England, Ireland, and his native Australia". O'Reilly has become one of the most visible exponents of Christian anarchism, both active in its practice and the theoretical exploration of its ideas. As the writer Alexandre Christoyannopoulos quotes him as arguing, O'Reilly contends that Christian anarchism "'is not an attempt to synthesise two systems of thought' that are hopelessly incompatible, but rather 'a realisation that the premise of anarchism is inherent in Christianity and the message of the Gospels'."

O'Reilly participated in anti-war disarming actions against US military aircraft in 1991 and 2003 for which he was criminally prosecuted, serving a prison sentence for the first incident. The legal case arising from the 2003 group action, known as the Pitstop Ploughshares, resulted, after three trials in Ireland, in a landmark acquittal. Following the case, he remained involved in peace activism in the United Kingdom and Australia.

== Early life ==
Implicit in Christian discipleship is an anarchist orientation towards power. We are called not to lord it over people but to serve them. Jesus refuses to become king and ushering his kingdom through the violence of the state. We become pacifist because we realise that Jesus was a pacifist; if he taught us anything on the cross he told us how to die rather than how to kill, and to suffer rather than cause suffering.

— O'Reilly 2010, 2:15

Ciaron O'Reilly took part in the 1980s civil rights, social justice and free speech movement in Queensland, Australia, opposed to state Premier Joh Bjelke-Petersen.

== Catholic Worker Movement ==
O'Reilly was working as a relief teacher in Queensland when he first came into contact with the Catholic Worker Movement (CW), founded in the United States by Dorothy Day and Peter Maurin during the Great Depression. O'Reilly subsequently founded Brisbane's West End Catholic Worker community along with Jim Dowling and Angela Jones, aiming to address social issues including youth homelessness among the Aboriginal community. He described the CW as composed of three practices which together constitute a life of integrity: living in intentional community, practicing the works of mercy, and nonviolent prophetic witness.

== Anti-war activism ==
During the 1991 Gulf War, O'Reilly was a member of the "ANZUS Ploughshares" group which attacked a B-52 Bomber which was on 20-minute scramble alert, at Griffiss AFB near Utica, New York. Their actions put the aircraft out of action for the next two months at the height of the US bombing campaign in Iraq. Together with the other members of the group, he was arrested and sentenced to 13 months in the US penal system. After his return to Australia, O'Reilly took part in the "Jabiluka Ploughshares" group action which disabled uranium mining equipment in the Northern Territory of Australia in 1998.

On a visit to Australia in February 2006 O'Reilly was pulled aside on arrival in Brisbane and interviewed by two Australian Security Intelligence Organisation (ASIO) officers. O'Reilly publicly accused ASIO of heavy-handed tactics, saying, "I felt it was a kind of intimidation basically; they were asking what my plans were for the next three months, in terms of politically organising against Australian involvement in the war. I don't see what business that has to do with them if their main thing is security."

== Trial in Ireland ==
In a landmark case, O'Reilly went to trial at Ireland's Four Courts for the third time for disarming a United State Navy warplane at (civil) Shannon Airport in the early hours of 3 February 2003: this group action became known as the Pitstop Ploughshares. Two earlier trials in 2005 had ended in mistrial; O'Reilly and four others (Deirdre Clancy, Nuin Dunlop, Karen Fallon and Damien Moran) were acquitted by an Irish jury on 25 July 2006.

The third trial of the Pitstop Ploughshares started on 10 July 2006. Judge Miriam Anderson had agreed on Day 9 of proceedings with the defence counsel, after extensive submissions and legal argument, on the applicability of the statutory "lawful excuse" defence. A unanimous "not guilty" verdict was returned on both charges. The Dublin jury of seven women and five men had deliberated for four and a half hours before deciding that all the accused should be acquitted. The defence case had been that all the defendants had conscientiously believed they were acting to save lives and property in Iraq and Ireland, and that their disarmament action was reasonable, taking into consideration all the circumstances.

After his acquittal, O'Reilly spent approximately three further years at London Catholic Worker's Giuseppe Conlon House in Harringay, London, from shortly after its opening in 2010. He lives in his native Australia. According to Christoyannopoulos, he is noted both for "his reflections on Christian anarchism, and partly for his example in putting these reflection[s] into practice". In later years he has been associated with the campaigns in support of Julian Assange, Edward Snowden, and Ben Griffin, who became O'Reilly's godson.

== Selected works ==
- O'Reilly, Ciaron (1986). The revolution will not be televised!: A campaign for free expression in Queensland (1982–1983) (pamphlet). Sydney: Jura Books. OCLC 37094418.
- — (1986). Let's not get carried away: Poems from Queensland. Brisbane, QLD, Australia: CO'R. OCLC 37063176.
- — (1988). Waging peace: A ten-year experiment with nonviolent resistance. Catholic Worker Movement. OCLC 44003635.
- — (1994). Bomber grounded, runway closed: Prison letters and court notes of a Gulf War resister. Marion, South Dakota (US): Rose Hill Books. ISBN 9780963622426.
- — (2001). Remembering Forgetting – A Journey of Nonviolent Resistance to the War on East Timor. Australia: Otford Press. ISBN 9781876928308. OCLC 52261682.

== See also ==
- Anarchism in Australia
- Anarchism in Ireland
- Anarchism in the United Kingdom
- Catholic Worker Movement
- Pitstop Ploughshares
- Plowshares movement
- Ben Griffin
- Martin Newell
- List of peace activists
