= Lü Simian =

Chinese historian

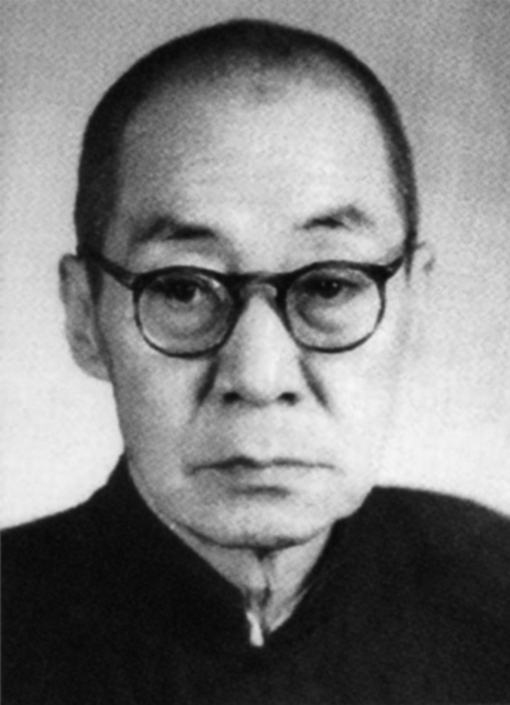
- Born: 27 February 1884; Wujin, Jiangsu, China
- Died: 9 October 1957 (aged 73); Shanghai
- Citizenship: Chinese
- Scientific career
- Fields: Ancient Chinese history
- Workplaces: East China Normal University

Lü Simian (Chinese: 呂思勉; pinyin: Lǚ Sīmiǎn; Wade–Giles: Lü Ssu-mien; February 27, 1884 – October 9, 1957) was a Chinese historian. He was a former professor and history department head at Kwang Hua University, a predecessor of the East China Normal University in Shanghai. Lü took the courtesy name Chéngzhī (诚之) and wrote under the pseudonym Núniú (驽牛). His students included famous historians Ch'ien Mu and Yang Kuan. Historian Yan Gengwang (严耕望) considered Lü one of the four greatest modern Chinese historians, along with his student Ch'ien Mu, Chen Yuan, and Chen Yinke.

In 1926 Lü was invited to teach at Kwang Hua University by his friend and the school's headmaster Qián Jībó (钱基博). Lü remained at the school, which later became part of East China Normal University, until his death.

Lü was born in Wujin (now Wujin district of Changzhou city) in China's Jiangsu province. At the age of 15 he entered the county school. In the second year he began teaching himself history. He later became a member of the Doubting Antiquity School which was a group of scholars and writers who showed doubts regarding the authenticity of pre-Qin texts.

His former residence in Changzhou is a protected property open to the public, offering numerous artifacts from his life displayed in the restored building.

== Notable publications ==
- Song Dynasty Literature (1931)
- An Introduction to Early Qin Science (1933)
- A History of Chinese Ethnic Minorities (1934)
- A History of Pre-Qin Era (1941)
- A History of the Three Kingdoms (1943)
- A History of Qin and Han Dynasties (1947)
- A History of Jin, Northern and Southern dynasties (1948)
- A History of Sui, Tang and Five Dynasties (1959)
- A History of the Chinese Political System (1985)
