= Christian anarchism =

Movement in political theology

Christian anarchism is a school of political theology that claims anarchism is inherent in Christianity and the Gospels. It is grounded in the belief that there is only one source of authority to which Christians are ultimately answerable—the authority of God as embodied in the teachings of Jesus. It therefore rejects the idea that human governments have ultimate authority over human societies. Christian anarchists denounce the state, believing it is violent, deceitful and idolatrous.

Christian anarchists hold that the "Kingdom of God" is the proper expression of the relationship between God and humanity. Under the "Kingdom of God", human relationships would be characterized by horizontal organization, servant leadership, and universal compassion—not through the traditional structures of organized religion, which most Christian anarchists consider hierarchical or authoritarian structures. Most Christian anarchists are also pacifists who reject war, militarism, and the use of violence.

More than any other Bible source, the Beatitudes are seen as a basis for Christian anarchism. Leo Tolstoy's The Kingdom of God Is Within You is often regarded as a key text for modern Christian anarchism.

== Origins ==
=== Old Testament ===
Jacques Ellul, a French philosopher and Christian anarchist, notes that the final verse of the Book of Judges (Judges 21:25) states that there was no king in Israel and that "everyone did as they saw fit". Subsequently, as recorded in the first Book of Samuel (1 Samuel 8) the people of Israel wanted a king "so as to be like other nations". The Australian Christian anarchist Dave Andrews believes that the Israelites lived in a "decentralized federation of tribes". Ellul describes that when important decisions were made, a popular assembly was held, which had the final say. Christian anarchists claim that until Samuel the Israelites had neither king nor central government, with God as the sole authority. The Israelites had no taxes or rent and there was equal access to basic resources. Israel's rallying cry was "We have no king but Yahweh." The American anarchist Peter Gelderloos sees a strong decentralization during the monarchy, seeing the Kingdom of Israel not as a state and that its intervention was minimal, dedicated only to the battlefield and the construction of some temple.

God declared that the people had rejected him as their king. He warned that a human king would lead to militarism, conscription and punitive taxation, and that their pleas for mercy from the king's demands would go unanswered. Samuel passed on God's warning to the Israelites but they still demanded a king, and Saul became their ruler. Much of the subsequent Old Testament chronicles the Israelites trying to live with this decision.

=== New Testament ===
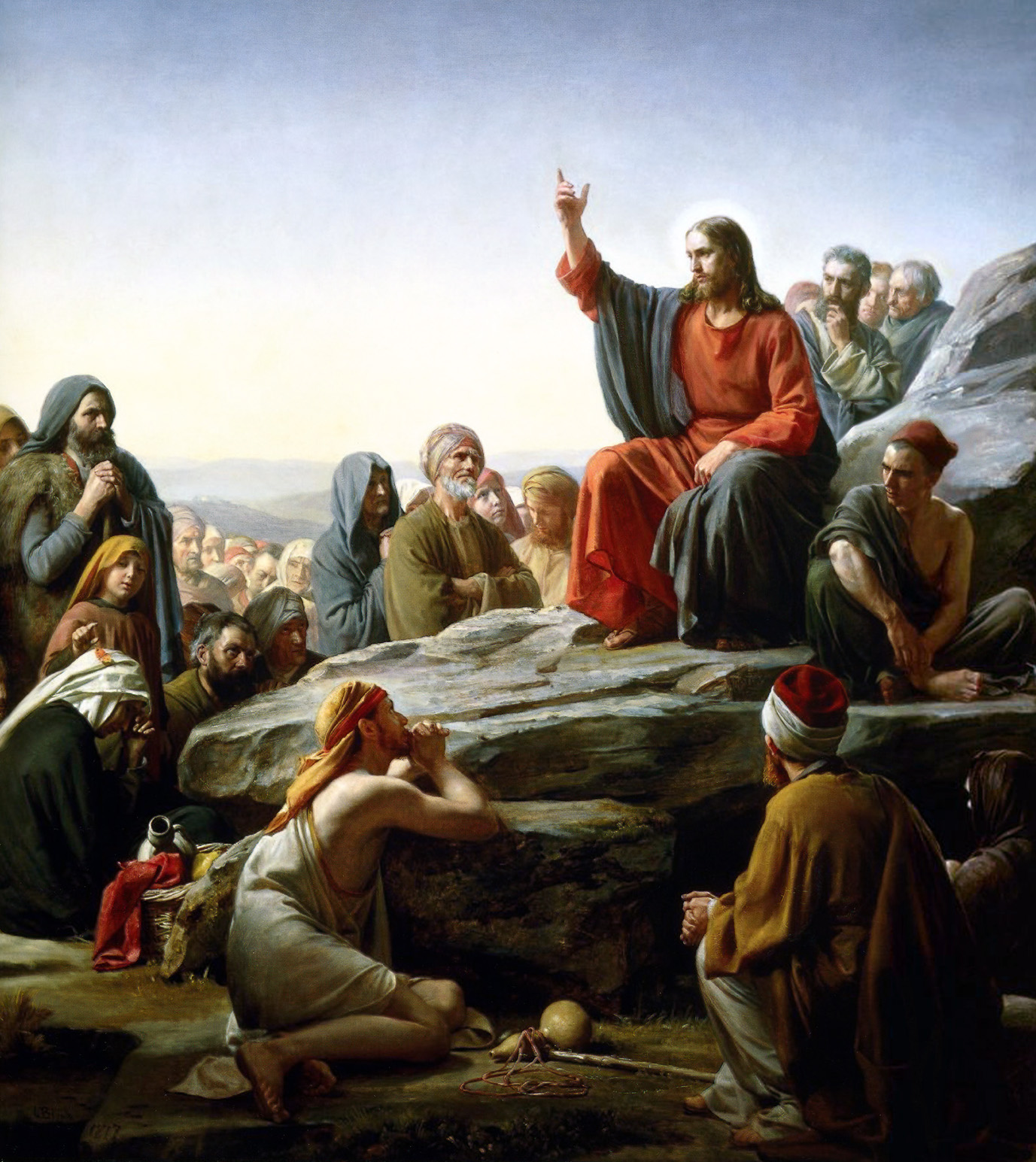
Carl Heinrich Bloch's depiction of the Sermon on the Mount

More than any other Bible source, the Sermon on the Mount is considered the basis for Christian anarchism. Alexandre Christoyannopoulos explains that the Sermon perfectly illustrates Jesus's central teaching of love and forgiveness. Christian anarchists claim that the state, founded on violence, contravenes the Sermon and Jesus' call to love one's enemies.

The gospels tell of Jesus's temptation in the desert. For the final temptation, Jesus is taken up to a high mountain by Satan and told that if he bows down to Satan he will give him all the kingdoms of the world. Christian anarchists use this as evidence that all Earthly kingdoms and governments are ruled by Satan, otherwise they would not be Satan's to give. Jesus refuses the temptation, choosing to serve God instead, implying that Jesus is aware of the corrupting nature of Earthly power.

Christian eschatology and various Christian anarchists, such as Jacques Ellul, have identified the state and political power as the Beast in the Book of Revelation.

Friedrich Nietzsche and Frank Seaver Billings criticize Christianity and anarchism by arguing that they are the same thing.

=== Early Church ===
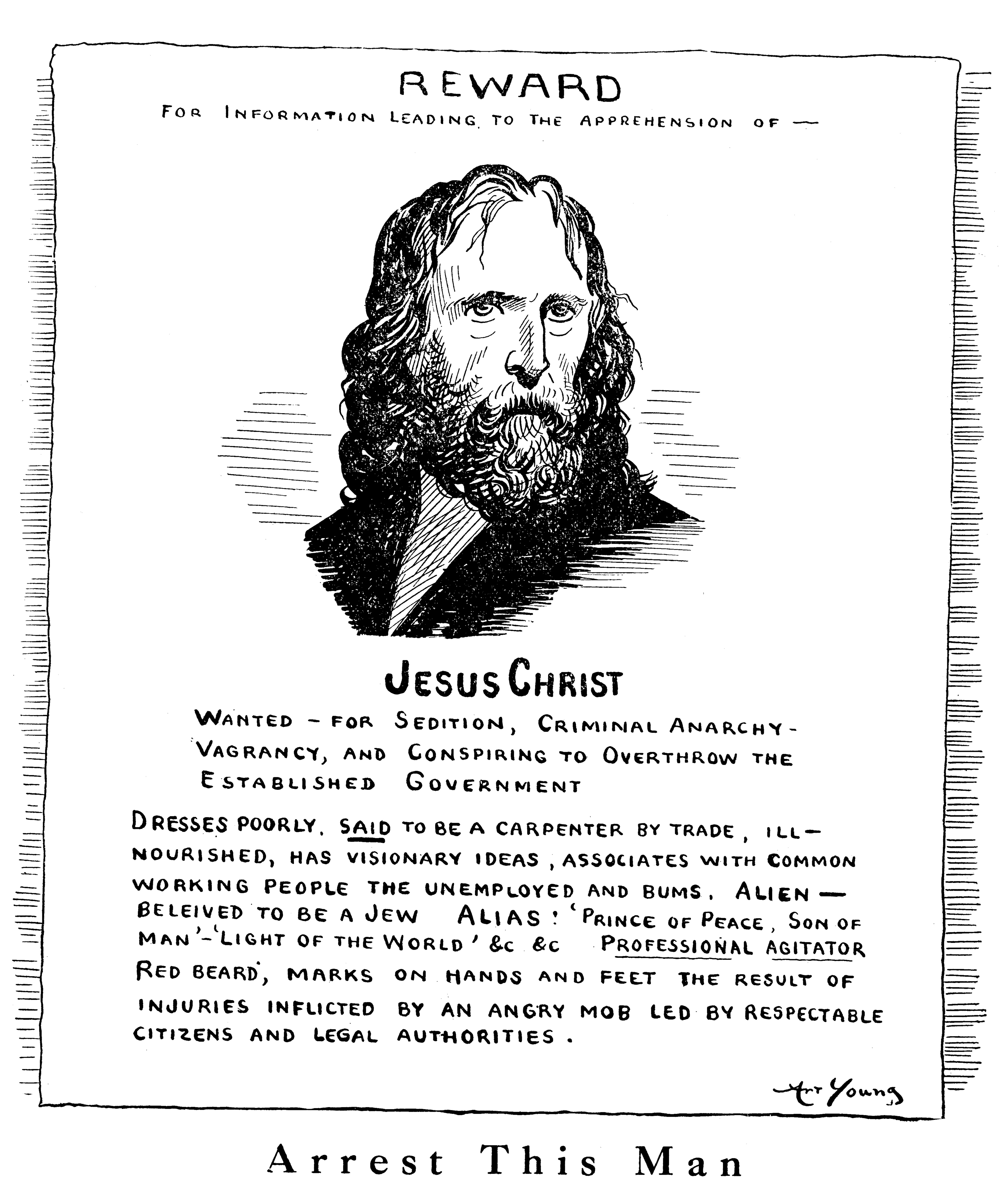
The Masses, 1917 political cartoon by socialist cartoonist Art Young

According to Alexandre Christoyannopoulos, several of the Church Fathers' writings suggest anarchism as God's ideal. The first Christians opposed the primacy of the state: "We must obey God as ruler rather than men" (Acts 4:19, 5:29, 1 Corinthians 6:1-6); "Stripping the governments and the authorities bare, he exhibited them in open public as conquered, leading them in a triumphal procession by means of it" (Colossians 2:15). Also, some early Christian communities appear to have practised anarchist communism, such as the Jerusalem group described in Acts, who shared their money and labour equally and fairly among the members. Roman Montero claims that using an anthropological framework, such as that of the anarchist David Graeber, one can plausibly reconstruct the communism of the early Christian communities and that the practices were widespread, long-lasting, and substantial. Christian anarchists, such as Kevin Craig, insist that the communities were centred on true love and care for one another, rather than liturgy. They also allege the reason early Christians were persecuted was not that they worshipped Jesus Christ, but that they refused to worship human idols claiming divine status (see Imperial cult). Since they refused to worship the Roman Emperor, they refused to swear any oath of allegiance to the Roman Empire.

In his introduction to a translation of the Sayings of the Desert Fathers, Thomas Merton describes the early monastics as "in a certain sense 'anarchists', and it will do no harm to think of them in that light. They were men who did not believe in letting themselves be passively guided and ruled by a decadent state, and who believed that there was a way of getting along without slavish dependence on accepted, conventional values. ... The society they sought was one where all men were truly equal, where the only authority under God was the charismatic authority of wisdom, experience and love. Of course, they acknowledged the benevolent, hierarchical authority of their bishops: but the bishops were far away and said little about what went on in the desert until the great Origenist conflict at the end of the fourth century."

=== Conversion of the Roman Empire ===
For Christian anarchists, the moment that epitomised the degeneration of Christianity was the conversion of Emperor Constantine after his victory at the Battle of the Milvian Bridge in 312. Christianity was then legalized under the Edict of Milan in 313, which hastened the Church's transformation from a humble bottom-up sect to an authoritarian top-down organization. Christian anarchists point out that marked the beginning of the "Constantinian shift" in which Christianity gradually came to be identified with the will of the ruling elite by becoming the state church of the Roman Empire and in some cases (such as the Crusades, Inquisition, and the French Wars of Religion) a religious justification for violence.

=== Peasant revolts in the Post-Reformation era ===
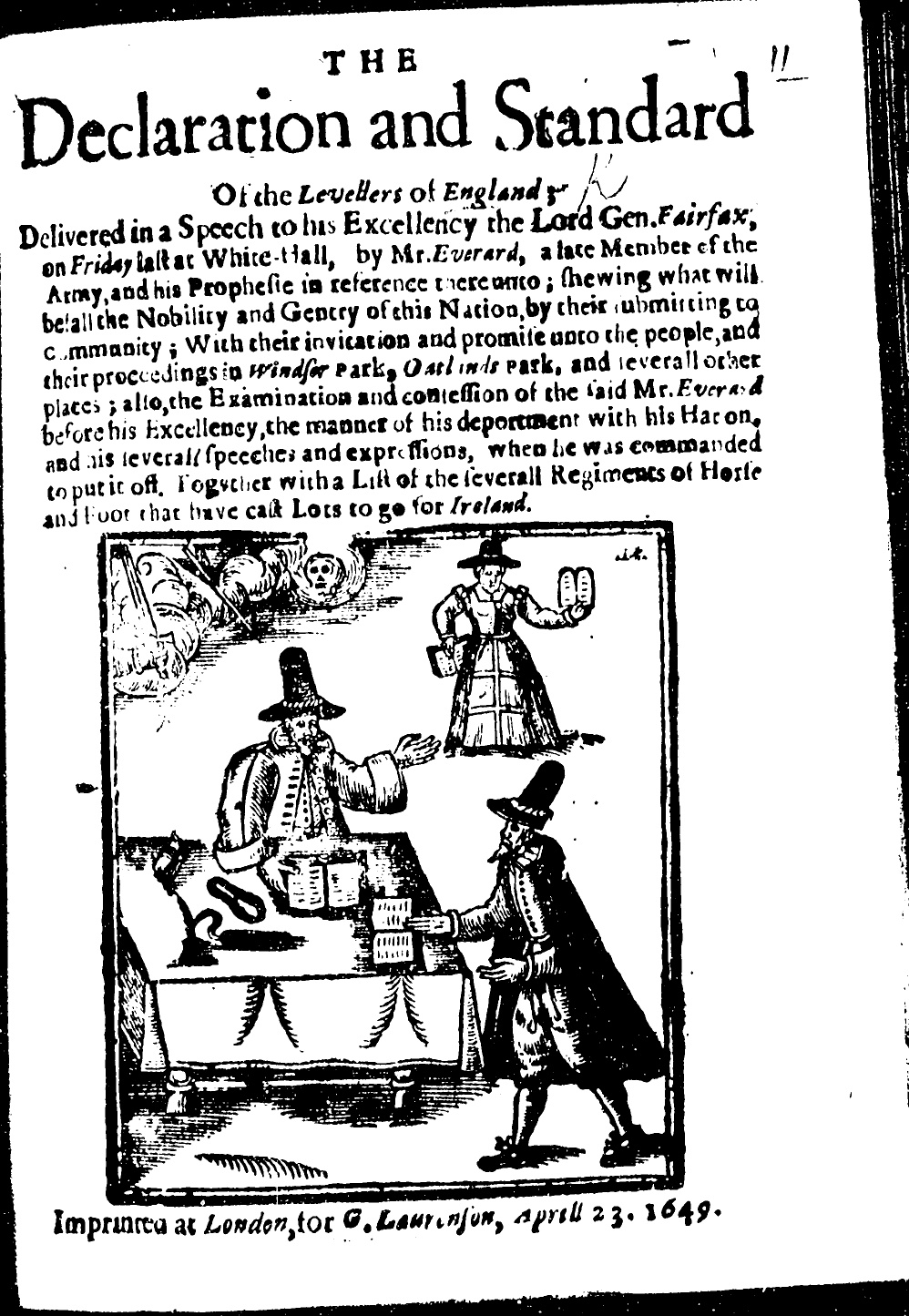
Woodcut from a Diggers document by William Everard

Various libertarian socialist authors have identified the written work of the English Protestant social reformer Gerrard Winstanley and the social activism of his group, the Diggers, as anticipating their line of thought. For the anarchist historian George Woodcock,

Although (Pierre Joseph) Proudhon was the first writer to call himself an anarchist, at least two predecessors outlined systems that contain all the basic elements of anarchism. The first was Gerrard Winstanley (1609–1676), a linen draper who led the small movement of the Diggers during the Commonwealth. Winstanley and his followers protested in the name of a radical Christianity against the economic distress that followed the Civil War and against the inequality that the grandees of the New Model Army seemed intent on preserving.

In 1649–1650, the Diggers squatted on stretches of common land in southern England and attempted to set up communities based on work on the land and the sharing of goods. The communities failed following a crackdown by the English authorities, but a series of pamphlets by Winstanley survived, of which The New Law of Righteousness (1649) was the most important. Advocating a rational Christianity, Winstanley equated Christ with 'the universal liberty' and declared the universally corrupting nature of authority. He saw 'an equal privilege to share in the blessing of liberty' and detected an intimate link between the institution of property and the lack of freedom.

For Murray Bookchin,

{{|In the modern world, anarchism first appeared as a movement of the peasantry and yeomanry against declining feudal institutions. In Germany its foremost spokesman during the Peasant Wars was Thomas Müntzer; in England, Gerrard Winstanley, a leading participant in the Digger movement. The concepts held by Müntzer and Winstanley were superbly attuned to the needs of their time – a historical period when the majority of the population lived in the countryside and when the most militant revolutionary forces came from an agrarian world. It would be painfully academic to argue whether Müntzer and Winstanley could have achieved their ideals. What is of real importance is that they spoke to their time; their anarchist concepts followed naturally from the rural society that furnished the bands of the peasant armies in Germany and the New Model in England.}}

=== Modern era ===
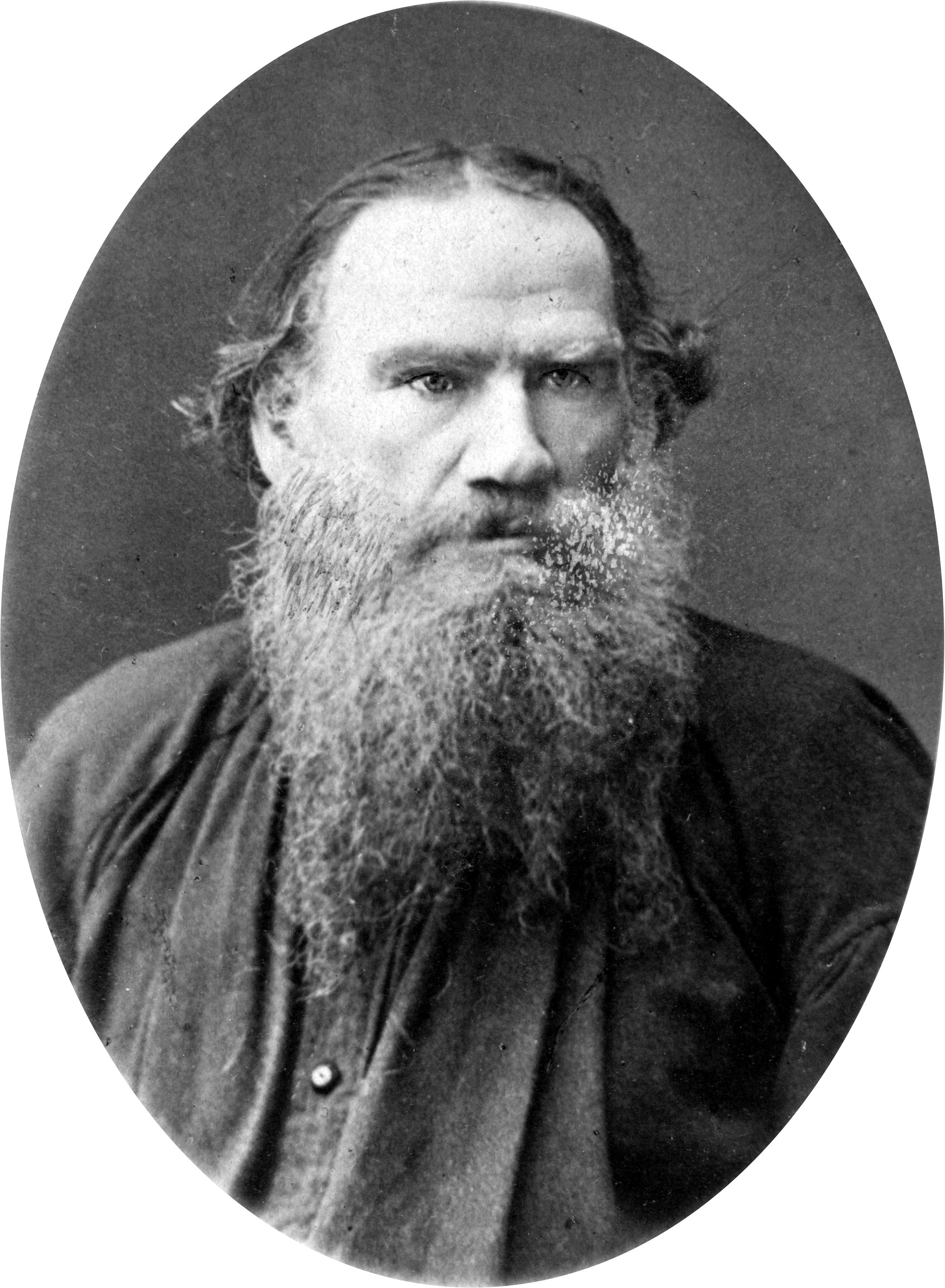
Leo Tolstoy wrote the book The Kingdom of God Is Within You, which is considered an important Christian anarchist text.

The 19th-century Christian abolitionists Adin Ballou and William Lloyd Garrison were critical of all human governments and believed that they would be eventually supplanted by a new order in which individuals are guided solely by their love for God. Ballou and Garrison advocated Christian nonresistance to evil, as they saw Christ as the embodiment of "passive nonresistance" or nonviolent praxis against the state. They both condemned violence against southern slave owners and advocated instead for moral suasion or consistent rebukes against the institution of slavery in efforts to persuade racist southerns and indifferent northerners to the abolitionists' cause. At the outbreak of the Civil War, however, Garrison later embraced the armed struggle for black liberation and the Lincoln administration. Ballou remained a lifelong pacifist and condemned the Civil War for fear of the eventual retaliation by white southerners on freed black Americans.

Ballou's and Garrison's writings heavily influenced Leo Tolstoy, who was inspired by their lifelong commitment to abolitionism. Tolstoy wrote extensively on his burgeoning Christian anarchist principles in nonfiction books like The Kingdom of God is Within You, which is considered a key Christian anarchist text. Tolstoy sought to separate Russian Orthodox Christianity, which was merged with the state, from what he believed was the true message of Jesus as contained in the Gospels, specifically in the Sermon on the Mount. He took the viewpoint that all governments that wage war and churches that in turn support those governments, are an affront to the Christian principles of nonviolence. Although Tolstoy never actually used the term "Christian anarchism" in The Kingdom of God Is Within You, reviews of the book after its publication in 1894 appear to have coined the term.

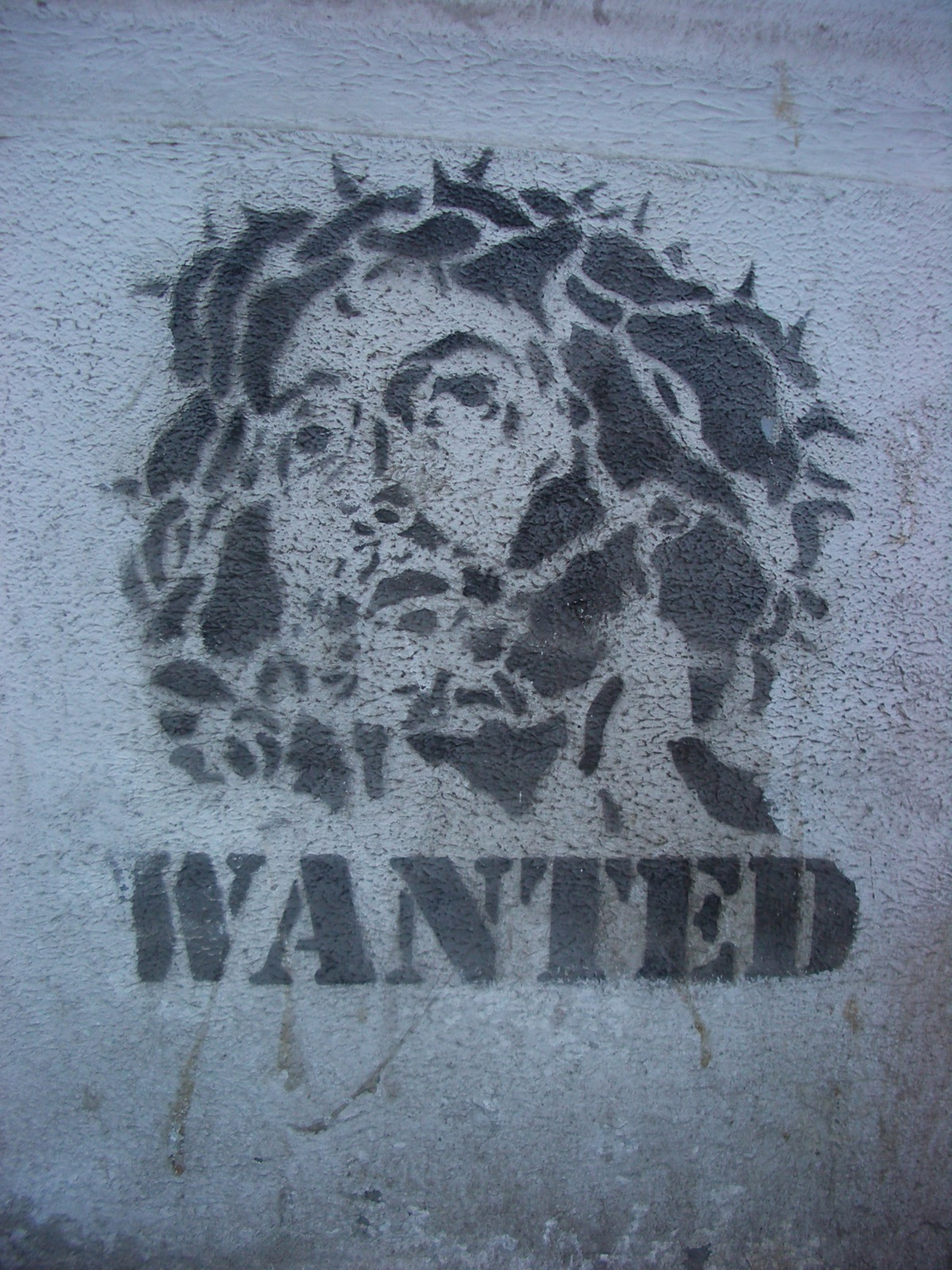
Christian anarchist graffiti of Jesus Christ

Thomas J. Hagerty, a Marxist Catholic priest turned oculist, was a primary author of the Industrial Workers of the World (IWW) Preamble ("an injury to one is an injury to all"). IWW members included Christian anarchists like Dorothy Day and Ammon Hennacy.

Dorothy Day was a journalist turned social activist who became known for her social justice campaigns in defense of the poor. Alongside Peter Maurin, she founded the Catholic Worker Movement in 1933, which espoused nonviolence and hospitality for the impoverished and the downtrodden. Day was declared Servant of God when a cause for sainthood was opened for her by Pope John Paul II. Day's distributist economic views are very similar to Proudhon's mutualism by which she was influenced. Day also named the phrase "precarious work" based on the former anarchocommunist Léonce Crenier's embrace of poverty. Peter Maurin's vision to transform the social order consisted of establishing urban houses of hospitality to care for the destitute, rural farming communities to teach city dwellers agrarianism and encourage a movement back to the land, and roundtable discussions in community centres to clarify thought and initiate action.

Simone Weil was a French philosopher who was very early animated by a great compassion for the exploited. She was first a socialist and then an anarchist. In 1930s, she converted to "love of Christ". During her experience, she explains that she suddenly felt that Christianity was the religion of the slaves and that she, like other slaves, could not resist adhering to it. She is considered a "Christian mystic" and an "anarchist Christian".

== Anarchist biblical views and practices ==
=== Church authority ===
With some notable exceptions such as the Catholic Worker Movement, many Christian anarchists are critical of Church dogma and rituals. Christian anarchists tend to wish that Christians were less preoccupied with performing rituals and preaching dogmatic theology, and more with following Jesus' teaching and practices. Jacques Ellul and Dave Andrews claim that Jesus did not intend to be the founder of an institutional religion, while Michael Elliot believes one of Jesus' intentions was to bypass human intermediaries and do away with priests.

=== Pacifism and nonviolence ===
Christian anarchists, such as David Lipscomb, Leo Tolstoy, Ammon Hennacy, Jacques Ellul, and Dave Andrews, follow Jesus' call to not resist evil but turn the other cheek. They argue that this teaching can only imply a condemnation of the state, as the police and army hold a monopoly over the legitimate use of force. They believe freedom will only be guided by the grace of God if they show compassion to others and turn the other cheek when confronted with violence. Christian anarchists believe violence begets violence and the ends never justify the means.

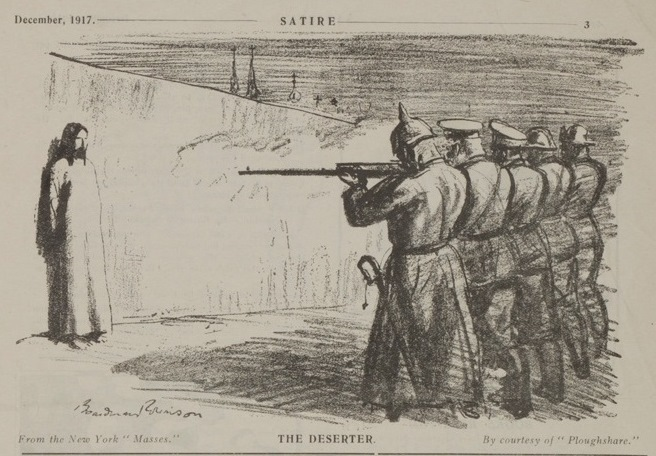
The Deserter (1916) by Boardman Robinson

Many Christian anarchists practice the principles of nonviolence, nonresistance, and turning the other cheek. To illustrate how nonresistance works in practice, Alexandre Christoyannopoulos offers the following Christian anarchist response to terrorism:

The path shown by Jesus is a difficult one that can only be trod by true martyrs. A "martyr," etymologically, is he who makes himself a witness to his faith. And it is the ultimate testimony to one's faith to be ready to put it to practice even when one's very life is threatened. But the life to be sacrificed, it should be noted, is not the enemy's life, but the martyr's own life—killing others is not a testimony of love, but of anger, fear, or hatred. For Tolstoy, therefore, a true martyr to Jesus' message would neither punish nor resist (or at least not use violence to resist), but would strive to act from love, however hard, whatever the likelihood of being crucified. He would patiently learn to forgive and turn the other cheek, even at the risk of death. Such would be the only way to eventually win the hearts and minds of the other camp and open up the possibilities for reconciliation in the "war on terror".

=== Simple living ===
Christian anarchists such as Ammon Hennacy, Peter Maurin and Dorothy Day often advocate voluntary poverty. This can be for a variety of reasons, such as withdrawing support for government by reducing taxable income or following Jesus' teachings. Jesus appears to teach voluntary poverty when he told his disciples, "It is easier for a camel to go through the eye of a needle than for a rich man to enter the kingdom of God" (Mark 10:25) and "You cannot serve both God and Mammon" (Luke 16:13).

=== State authority ===
The most common challenge for anarchist theologians is interpreting Paul's Epistle to the Romans 13:1–7, in which Paul demanded obedience to governing authorities and described them as God's servants exacting punishment on wrongdoers. Romans 13:1–7 holds the most explicit reference to the state in the New Testament but other parallel texts include Titus 3:1, Hebrews 13:17 and 1 Peter 2:13-17.

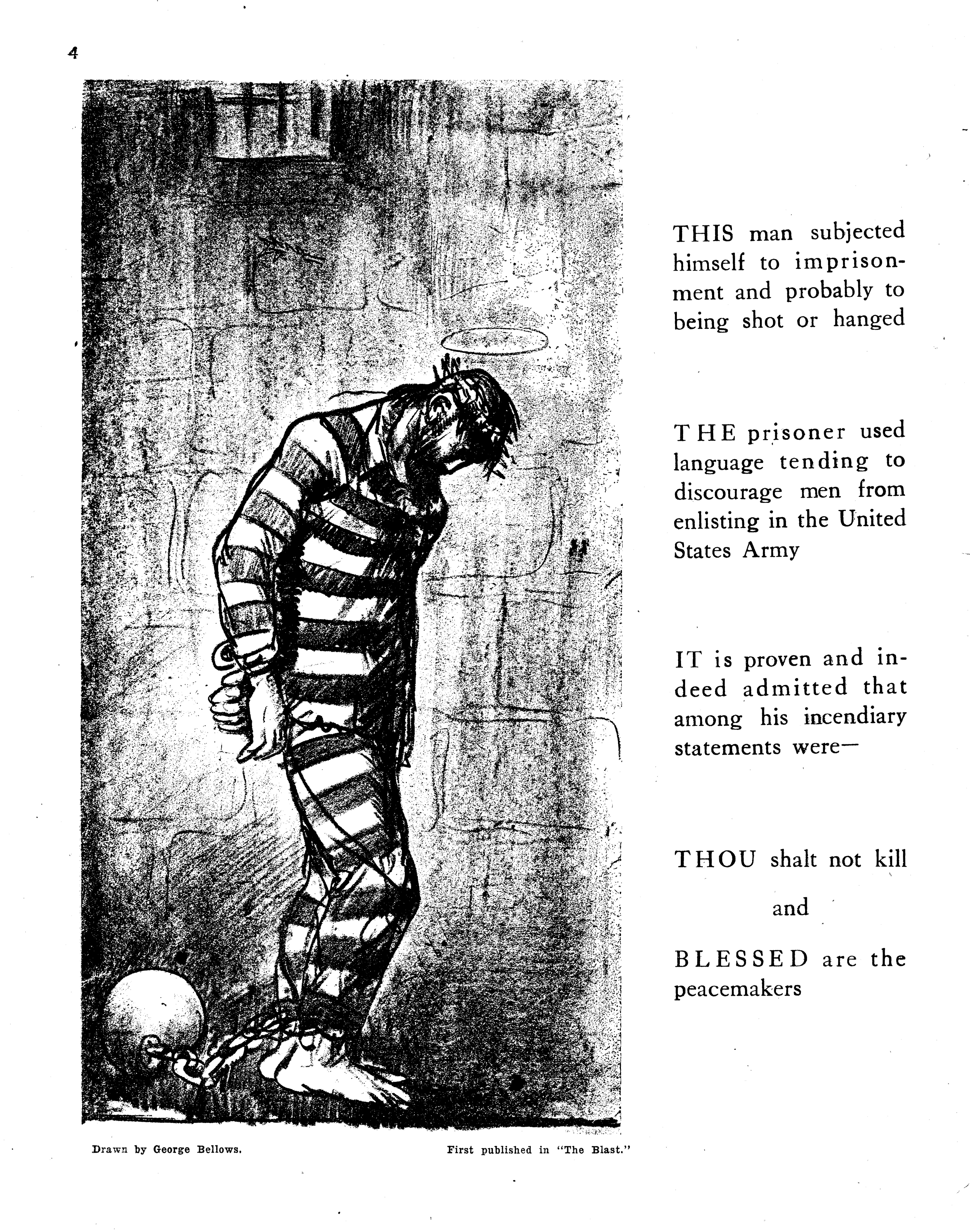
Blessed are the Peacemakers (1917) by George Bellows

Some theologians, such as C.E.B. Cranfield, have interpreted Romans 13:1–7 to mean the Church should support the state, as God has sanctified the state to be his main tool to preserve social order. Similarly, in the case of the state being involved in a "just war," some theologians argue that it's permissible for Christians to serve the state and wield the sword. Christian anarchists do not share these interpretations of Romans 13 but still recognize it as "a very embarrassing passage".

Christian anarchists and pacifists such as Jacques Ellul and Vernard Eller do not attempt to overthrow the state given Romans 13 and Jesus' command to turn the other cheek. As wrath and vengeance are contrary to the Christian values of kindness and forgiveness, Ellul neither supports, nor participates in, the state. Eller articulates this position by restating the passage this way:

Be clear, any of those human [authorities] are where they are only because God is allowing them to be there. They exist only at his sufferance. And if God is willing to put up with...the Roman Empire, you ought to be willing to put up with it, too. There is no indication God has called you to clear it out of the way or get it converted for him. You can't fight an Empire without becoming like the Roman Empire; so you had better leave such matters in God's hands where they belong.

Christians who interpret Romans 13 as advocating support for governing authorities are left with the difficulty of how to act under tyrants or dictators. Ernst Käsemann, in his Commentary on Romans, challenged the mainstream Christian interpretation of the passage in light of German Lutheran Churches using this passage to justify the Holocaust.

Paul's letter to Roman Christians declares "For rulers hold no terror for those who do right, but for those who do wrong"; however, Christian anarchists point out an inconsistency if this text were to be taken literally and in isolation as Jesus and Paul were both executed by the governing authorities or "rulers" even though they did "right".

There are also Christians anarchists such as Leo Tolstoy and Ammon Hennacy, who favor Jesuism and do not see the need to integrate Paul's teachings into their subversive way of life. Tolstoy believed Paul was instrumental in the church's "deviation" from Jesus' teaching and practices whilst Hennacy believed "Paul spoiled the message of Christ". In contrast to Eller, Hennacy and Ciaron O'Reilly advocate nonviolent civil disobedience to confront state oppression.

=== Swearing of oaths ===
In the Sermon on the Mount (Matthew 5:33-37), Jesus tells his followers to not swear oaths in the name of God or Man. Tolstoy, Adin Ballou and Petr Chelčický understand this to mean that Christians should never bind themselves to any oath as they may not be able to fulfil the will of God if they are bound to the will of a fellow-man. Tolstoy takes the view that all oaths are evil, but especially an oath of allegiance.

=== Tax ===
Some Christian anarchists resist taxes in the belief that their government is engaged in immoral, unethical or destructive activities such as war, and paying taxes inevitably funds these activities, whilst others submit to taxation. Adin Ballou wrote that if the act of resisting taxes requires physical force to withhold what a government tries to take, then it is important to submit to taxation. Ammon Hennacy, who, like Ballou also believed in nonresistance, eased his conscience by simply living below the income tax threshold.

Christian anarchists do not interpret the injunction in Matthew 22:21 to "give to Caesar what is Caesar's" as advocating support for taxes, but as further advice to free oneself from material attachment. For example, Dorothy Day said if we were to give everything to God there will be nothing left for Caesar, and Jacques Ellul believed the passage showed that Caesar may have rights over fiat money but not things that are made by God, as he explained:

"Render unto Caesar..." in no way divides the exercise of authority into two realms. ... They were said in response to another matter: the payment of taxes, and the coin. The mark on the coin is that of Caesar; it is the mark of his property. Therefore give Caesar this money; it is his. It is not a question of legitimizing taxes! It means that Caesar, having created money, is its master. That's all. Let us not forget that money, for Jesus, is the domain of Mammon, a satanic domain!

=== Vegetarianism ===
Vegetarianism in the Christian tradition has a long history commencing in the first centuries of Church with the Desert Fathers and Desert Mothers who abandoned the "world of men" for intimacy with the God of Jesus Christ. Vegetarianism amongst hermits and Christian monastics in the Eastern Christian and Roman Catholic traditions remains common to this day as a means of simplifying one's life, and as a practice of asceticism. Leo Tolstoy, Ammon Hennacy, and Théodore Monod extended their belief in nonviolence and compassion to all living beings through vegetarianism.

== Present-day Christian anarchist groups ==
=== Brotherhood Church ===
The Brotherhood Church is a Christian anarchist and pacifist community. The Brotherhood Church can be traced back to 1887 when a Congregationalist minister called John Bruce Wallace started a magazine called The Brotherhood in Limavady, Northern Ireland. An intentional community with Quaker origins has been located at Stapleton, near Pontefract, Yorkshire, since 1921.

=== Catholic Worker Movement ===
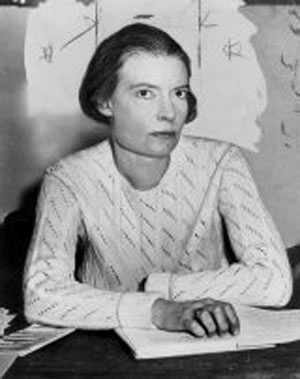
Dorothy Day, co-founder of the Catholic Worker Movement

Established by Peter Maurin and Dorothy Day in the early 1930s, the Catholic Worker Movement is a Christian movement dedicated to nonviolence, personalism and voluntary poverty. Over 130 Catholic Worker communities exist in the United States where "houses of hospitality" care for the homeless. The Joe Hill House of hospitality (which closed in 1968) in Salt Lake City, Utah featured an enormous twelve feet by fifteen foot mural of Jesus Christ and Joe Hill. Present-day Catholic Workers include Ciaron O'Reilly, an Irish-Australian civil rights and anti-war activist.

Anne Klejment, professor of history at University of St. Thomas, wrote of the Catholic Worker Movement:

The Catholic Worker considered itself a Christian anarchist movement. All authority came from God; and the state, having by choice distanced itself from Christian perfectionism, forfeited its ultimate authority over the citizen...Catholic Worker anarchism followed Christ as a model of nonviolent revolutionary behavior...He respected individual conscience. But he also preached a prophetic message, difficult for many of his contemporaries to embrace.

The Catholic Worker Movement has consistently protested against war and violence for over seven decades. Many of the leading figures in the movement have been both anarchists and pacifists, as Ammon Hennacy explains:

Christian Anarchism is based upon the answer of Jesus to the Pharisees when Jesus said that he without sin should be the first to cast the stone, and upon the Sermon on the Mount which advises the return of good for evil and the turning of the other cheek. Therefore, when we take any part in government by voting for legislative, judicial, and executive officials, we make these men our arm by which we cast a stone and deny the Sermon on the Mount. The dictionary definition of a Christian is one who follows Christ; kind, kindly, Christ-like. Anarchism is voluntary cooperation for good, with the right of secession. A Christian anarchist is therefore one who turns the other cheek, overturns the tables of the moneychangers, and does not need a cop to tell him how to behave. A Christian anarchist does not depend upon bullets or ballots to achieve his ideal; he achieves that ideal daily by the One-Man Revolution with which he faces a decadent, confused, and dying world.

Maurin and Day were both baptized and confirmed in the Catholic Church and believed in the institution, thus showing it is possible to be a Christian anarchist and still choose to remain within a church. After her death, Day was proposed for sainthood by the Claretian Missionaries in 1983. Pope John Paul II granted the Archdiocese of New York permission to open Day's cause for sainthood in March 2000, calling her a Servant of God.

=== Online communities ===
Essays in Anarchism and Religion (edited by Matthew Adams and Alexandre Christoyannopoulos, 2017)

Numerous Christian anarchist websites, social networking sites, forums, electronic mailing lists and blogs have emerged on the internet over the last few years. These include: The AnarchoChristian Podcast and Website; Biblical Anarchy: Obey God Rather Than Men; The Libertarian Christian Institute, started by Norman Horn; A Pinch of Salt, a 1980s Christian anarchist magazine revived in 2006 by Keith Hebden as a blog and bi-annual magazine; Libera Catholick Union founded in 1988 and re-organized in 2019; Jesus Radicals founded by Mennonites in 2000; Lost Religion of Jesus created in 2005; Christian Anarchists created in 2006; The Mormon Worker, a blog and newspaper, founded in 2007 to promote Mormonism, anarchism and pacifism; and Academics and Students Interested in Religious Anarchism (ASIRA), founded by Alexandre Christoyannopoulos in 2008.

== Criticism ==
Critics of Christian anarchism include both Christians and anarchists. Christians often cite Romans 13 as evidence that the state should be obeyed, while secular anarchists reject belief in any authority including God. The latter often denounce religious dogma through use of the slogan "no gods, no masters". Christian anarchists often believe Romans 13 is taken out of context, emphasizing that Revelation 13 and Isaiah 13, among other passages, are needed to fully understand the meaning of Romans 13 text.

The anarchist Luigi Galleani was a critic of Tolstoy, considering his philosophy an impossible attempt at a revival of Christianity and his morality. He did not consider Tolstoy an anarchist, despite recognizing his criticisms of the state, the church and property, considering the defense of divine authority contrary to anarchism. He saw Tolstoy's ideas as a theological metaphysics based on an anti-human morality. The British anarcho-communist Albert Meltzer was also critical of Tolstoy and his pacifism. Although he maintained that a pacifist or a Christian could be an anarchist, he considered Christian anarchism to be synonymous with liberalism.

== See also ==
- Acephali – Various leaderless Christian sects
- Anarchism and Islam
- Anarchism and Orthodox Judaism
- Anarchism and religion
- Anarchist symbolism#No gods, no masters – Typical symbols expressing anarchist ideology
- Christianity and politics – Aspect of political history
- Christian libertarianism – Synthesis of Christian beliefs with libertarian thought
- Christian communism – Form of communism based on the life and teachings of Jesus Christ
- Christian socialism – Type of socialist philosophy
- Christian fascism – Type of fascist philosophy
- Distributism – Economic theory promoting local control
- Liberation theology – Christian theological approach
- New Monasticism – American Christian movement
- Plowshares movement – Christian pacifist movement
- Postmodern theology – Theological movement
- Radical Reformation – Anabaptist movement concurrent with the Protestant Reformation
- Render unto Caesar – Phrase attributed to Jesus in the synoptic gospels
- Statolatry – Worship of the state
- Theonomy – Christian form of government ruled by divine law
- Tolstoyan movement – Social movement based on the views of Leo Tolstoy
- Utopian socialism – Political theory concerned with imagined socialist societies
