= Chen Yuan (historian) =

Chinese historian and educator

- 陳垣
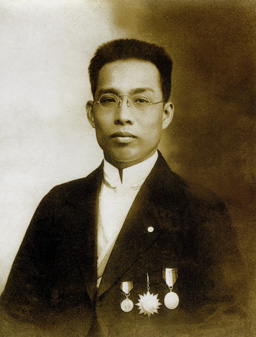
- Chen Yuan

2nd President of Fu Jen Catholic University
- In office 1929–1951
- Preceded by: Barry O'Toole
- Succeeded by: Paul Yü Pin

31st President of Beijing Normal University
- In office 1952–1971
- Preceded by: Lin Liru
- Succeeded by: Wang Zikun

Personal details
- Born: 12 November 1880 Xinhui, Guangdong, Qing China
- Died: 21 June 1971 (aged 90) Beijing, PRC
- Education: Lingnan University (Guangzhou)

Chen Yuan (Chinese: 陳垣; 12 November 1880 – 21 June 1971) was a Chinese historian and educator. Chen, together with Lü Simian, Chen Yinke and Ch'ien Mu, was known as the "Four Greatest Historians" of Modern China (現代四大史學家).

He is known for his work in the fields of religious history, Yuan Dynasty history, textology and textual criticism. Chen was a professor of Peking University, Beijing Normal University and Fu Jen Catholic University. He later served as the president of Beijing Normal University. Before 1949, he also served as the president of Metropolitan Library and the Palace Museum library.

From 1917, Chen began to work on the history of Christianity in China and later published his most famous book, Research of Arkaguns in Yuan Dynasty (Yuan Ye Li Ke Wen Kao) (《元也里可溫考》). Arkagun was the name given to Nestorian Christians during the Yuan dynasty.

Subsequently, he published several books about the spreading of Manichaeism, Zoroastrianism and Islam in China as well as various works on Buddhism, especially during the Qing dynasty. Chen also paid great attention to collation work on Code of Yuan Dynasty (《元典章》).

== Works (in selection) ==
- Zhongguo Fojiao shiji gailun 中国佛教史籍概论
- Nan Song chu Hebei xin daojiao kao 南宋初河北新道教考
- Qing chu seng zheng ji 清初僧诤记
- Jiu Wudai shiji ben fafu 旧五代史辑本发覆 (Liyun shuwu congke 励耘书屋丛刻)
- Yuan dianzhang jiaobu shili 元典章校补释例 (Liyun shuwu congke, 励耘书屋丛刻, Zhongguo shudian 中国书店)

== See also ==
- New Culture Movement
- Fu Jen School
- Fu Jen Catholic University
- Beijing Normal University
- 1952 reorganisation of Chinese higher education

Academic offices
Preceded by Barry O'Toole	President of Fu Jen Catholic University; 1929–1952	Succeeded by Paul Yü Pin
Preceded by Lin Liru	President of Beijing Normal University; 1952–1971	Succeeded by Wang Zikun
