= Pitstop Ploughshares =

Group of anti-war activists

The Pitstop Ploughshares were a group of five members of the Catholic Worker Movement who made their way into Shannon Airport in Ireland and damaged a United States Navy C-40 transport aircraft in the early hours of 3 February 2003. Their actions were inspired by the vision of Isaiah 2:4 to "beat swords into ploughshares".

The five members were Deirdre Clancy, Nuin Dunlop, Karen Fallon, Ciaron O'Reilly and Damien Moran.

== Trials ==
The Pitstop Ploughshares group spent between four and eleven weeks in Limerick Prison. They went to trial in Dublin Circuit Criminal Court in March and October 2005 on two counts of criminal damage, €100 and US$2.5 million. Penalties, if convicted, would have been a maximum of ten years imprisonment.

Their March 2005 trial collapsed on the sixth day when Judge O'Donnell called a mistrial, having made biased comments about a defence witness. Media were instructed not to report on the reasons for the mistrial until legal proceedings were completed.

The October 2005 re-trial collapsed on the tenth day, after Judge Donagh MacDonagh agreed with defence counsel that his attendance at the United States presidential inauguration in 2001 of George W. Bush (along with other meetings he had with Bush when he was Governor of Texas) were grounds for his removal from the case, in that his role was tainted with a "perception of bias".

The third trial of the Pitstop Ploughshares trial started on 10 July 2006 and resulted in a unanimous not guilty verdict on both charges of criminal damage (to the aircraft and the door of the hangar) after twelve days of testimony and legal argument. Judge Miriam Reynolds had agreed with the defence on day nine of the proceedings, after extensive submissions and legal argument, on the applicability of the statutory lawful excuse defence.

After four-and-a-half hours of deliberation, the Dublin jury of seven women and five men returned and gave their decision that all the accused should be acquitted, as they were acting to save lives and property in Iraq and Ireland, and that their disarmament action was reasonable, taking into consideration all the circumstances.

Over 100 international and numerous Irish anti-war activists converged in Dublin for all three trials. Public meetings took place around the trials, with well-known speakers such as Denis Halliday and Kathy Kelly.

== See also ==
- Trident Ploughshares – Anti-nuclear weapons group
