= Carl Hensler =

American Roman Catholic priest

Monsignor Carl P. Hensler
- Born: Carl Peter Hensler; November 7, 1898; Carnegie, Pennsylvania
- Died: November 21, 1984 (aged 86); North Hills Passavant Hospital, Pittsburgh, Pennsylvania
- Education: St. Vincent's Seminary, North American College
- Occupation: Priest
- Employer: Roman Catholic Diocese of Pittsburgh
- Known for: Catholic Radical Alliance
- Title: Monsignor
- Parent(s): Charles P. Hensler, Margaret E. Klein
- Relatives: Clara Hensler (sister; aka Sister Estelle), Paul Joseph Hensler (brother), Cecilia Hensler Johnson (sister), John Francis Hensler (brother), Mildred Hensler Graham (sister), Francis Gerard Hensler (brother), Mary Hensler (cousin)

Ecclesiastical career
- Religion: Christianity
- Church: Roman Catholic Church
- Ordained: March 15, 1924
- Congregations served: St. Joseph's Catholic Church, Mt. Pleasant; St. Brendan's Catholic Church, Braddock; St. Lawrence Church, Pittsburgh

Monsignor Carl Peter Hensler (November 7, 1898 – November 1984) was an American Roman Catholic priest of the Diocese of Pittsburgh. Nicknamed "the Labor Priest" in recognition of the help and support he gave to the Steel Workers union during his early career, he also became a founding member of the Catholic Radical Alliance. Describing the alliance in 1937, Hensler said:

"We contend that the relationship between Catholicism and Capitalism is one of fundamental opposition, which cannot be removed unless the ax of reform is laid to the very roots."

During the 1950s, he was assigned as pastor of St. George's Catholic Church, and was also appointed director of the Institute of Adult Education, which was sponsored by the Catholic Diocese of Pittsburgh.

== Formative years ==
Born in Carnegie, Pennsylvania on November 7, 1898, Carl Peter Hensler was a son of Charles P. Hensler and Margaret E. (Klein) Hensler and the brother of Clara Hensler (later known as Sister Estelle), Paul Joseph Hensler, Cecilia Hensler (married surname Johnson), John Francis Hensler, Mildred Hensler (married surname Graham), and Francis Gerard Hensler.

A graduate of St. Joseph's parochial school, he earned Bachelor of Arts and Licentiate in Philosophy degrees from Saint Vincent College in Latrobe, Pennsylvania in 1920.

== Theological training and ministry ==
Hensler then pursued theological training at the St. Vincent Seminary in Latrobe, earning his Master of Arts there in 1922. and at the North American College in Rome, Italy. He was a pupil of minimum wage proponent, John A. Ryan.

He was formally ordained as a priest at the Archbasilica of Saint John Lateran in Rome on March 15, 1924.

After initial ministries at St. Joseph's Catholic Church in Mt. Pleasant, Pennsylvania and at St. Brendan's Catholic Church in Braddock, Pennsylvania, he left for China on August 7, 1930 to help establish the Catholic University of Peking. His time there was challenging due to political unrest in the region and the escalating conflict between China and Japan, as well as the school's financial instability.

By the end of 1933, he was back in Pittsburgh, celebrating Christmas masses as an assistant pastor at St. Lawrence Church. During this period of his life, he also became a founding member of the Catholic Radical Alliance with two other Roman Catholic priests, Charles Owen Rice and George Barry O'Toole. In December 1934, he presented a lecture to the St. Lawrence Parent Teachers' Association, entitled "Human Rights Versus Property Rights."

In 1951, he was appointed as the pastor of St. George's Church. In 1958, he became the director of the Institute of Adult Education, which was sponsored by the Catholic Diocese of Pittsburgh.

Hensler died at the age of 86 at the North Hills Passavant Hospital on November 21, 1984. Funeral masses were held at St. Wendelin Church in Carrick, Pennsylvania on November 23 and 24.

== Sources ==
Archives of the Diocese of Pittsburgh, Record Group 22, subgroup 01I
