= New Friars =

The new friars is a modern social movement of a long tradition of Christian friars that has developed within certain Christian communities. These communities of men and women have voluntarily removed themselves from the status quo in order to seek justice and mercy with the poorest of the world's poor.

== Goals ==
The specific aim of each of these groups of people is to plant new communities in the desperate corners of the global fringe. They are artistic, international, ecumenical, contemplative people with a vision to see a flourishing of God's shalom. These outwardly oriented communities have been established in some of the highest poverty neighborhoods of the world, in places like Kolkata, India; Freetown, Sierra Leone; Caracas, Venezuela; and Los Angeles, California.

== Inspiration ==
This emerging missional renewal movement has been inspired by the old orders. They exist on the outer edge of the mainstream church like the old orders, and they enjoy many of the disciplines and liturgies developed within the old orders. What's more, they have benefited from some of the organizational, entrepreneurial, and strategic thinking of modern, evangelical missions agencies.

While these groups often parallel western communities who identify with the New Monasticism, the new monastic communities may be characterized by a centripetal force, renewing the church and the neighborhoods in which they exist by drawing people in, while the new friars by a centrifugal one, whose energy moves outward to the global margins, seeking to raise up and mobilize members to move into the cities of the majority world. Neomonastic communities in the west are like domestic cousins to the new friars, who inhabit the slums primarily in the developing world.

== Origins ==
The publishing of The New Friars in 2006 became a catalyst for several groups to begin conversation around the term. Viv Grigg, who helped to found Servants to Asia's Urban Poor in the 1980s, was among the first to use the language of Catholic orders in describing this mission-driven revival of incarnational ministry among the poor. But Grigg warns people from too closely tying this renewal movement to the old orders. “God is doing something new. Some of it may look very much like the old preaching orders of friars. But we must give God the freedom to do a new thing.” Others whose writings and work have influenced the movement include Dietrich Bonhoeffer, Michael Duncan, Athol Gill, and Ralph Winter.

The use of “friar” language is not universally accepted within the movement and must be held loosely. The new friars have roots in five historic, radically missional movements dating from the 5th to the 17th century – Celtic, Nestorian, Franciscan, Moravian, and Jesuit – only one of which, the Franciscans, could technically be identified as an order of “friars.” The apostolic qualities which unify these divergent groups are more critical than the “friar” terminology. These include five distinctives. These groups were/are incarnational, devotional, communal, missional and marginal, the very qualities showing up in new missional communities.

== Distinction of New Friars ==
1. Incarnational: The new friars seek to be the gospel by becoming part of the communities of the dispossessed among whom they seek to serve, moving into their informal shantytowns and becoming, to a large degree, one of them.
2. Devotional: The new friars are organized around a set of spiritual commitments to govern their walk with Jesus, with one another, and with the communities of lost, poor, or broken souls into which they have moved.
3. Communal: The new friars live together and hold in common many of those things that they held privately before joining the community.
4. Missional: The new friars have something of the spirit of mission-driven monks and nuns in them, leaving their mother countries and moving to those parts of the world where little is known about Jesus.
5. Marginal: The new friars are on the fringe of the mainstream church and they seek to plant themselves amount people who exist on the edge of society (sex workers, street kids, orphans and families who are simply trapped in poverty).

== Differences from "Traditional" Christian Friars ==
While these modern communities share much in common with the historic order of friars, there are a number of significant differences.

1. The modern movement is not predominantly a Catholic movement. It is, however, theologically broad enough for Catholics and Protestants to serve together.
2. The modern movement is not just for males. “Friar” is an exclusively male term, while the emerging movement is majority female and includes families.
3. The modern movement is vocationally diverse. The sort of transformation new friars seek in the world's poorest communities requires them to become, or at least to integrally enfold into their communities, organizational executives, business entrepreneurs, policy advocates, lawyers and any number of professional roles not afforded the strictly dedicated life of a clergyman.
4. The new friar communities have not taken vows of celibacy. An ecumenical community of families and singles serving among the poor will produce an entirely different environment than a community of gender exclusive individuals committed to living their entire lives in a state of celibacy.
