= Ben Griffin (British Army soldier) =

British peace activist and former British Army infantry soldier

- Born: Benjamin Griffin; 1977 (age 48–49); London, United Kingdom
- Military career
- Branch: British Army
- Service years: 1997–2005
- Wars: Iraq War

Benjamin Griffin (born 1977) is a British peace activist, and former British Army infantry soldier.

== Early life ==
Griffin was born in 1977 in London, England, to a family with military connections. He spent his childhood years in South London, his family relocating to Machynlleth in Wales when he was nine, and he received his formal education there and later in Swansea. During his teenage years he received early military training with the Army Cadet Force.

== Military career ==
In 1997, at the age of nineteen, he enlisted with the British Army's Parachute Regiment, going on to serve with its 2nd Battalion in garrison duty in Northern Ireland in the winding down of Operation Banner in the late 1990s-early 2000s, and in the Balkans where the battalion assisted with the disarming of the Macedonia National Liberation Army in the Western Macedonia mountains in 2001. In 2002, the battalion deployed to Afghanistan for 2 months, conducting policing operations, and training the Afghan National Army in the city of Kabul. Griffin subsequently applied to join the Special Air Service Regiment, and having passed its aptitude trials, he was attached to the S.A.S. in 2003.

At the beginning of 2005, he was deployed with the 22nd Special Air Service Regiment's 'G' Squadron in counter-insurgency operations in Baghdad in the aftermath of the 2nd Persian Gulf War. Griffin had already possessed personal political unease at the actions of the British Government in initiating the United Kingdom's entry into the conflict before his deployment in theatre, and during three months in the environs of the capital city he became disillusioned with the nature of the work in which he was engaged. He later cited concerns about the occupation demeanor, towards the local population, of United States Army units of 'Multi-National Force - Iraq' that he was working with, accusing them of being "trigger happy" compared with British Army's fire discipline, and overtly racially prejudiced, He morally objected to detainees, whom his Squadron were responsible for locating and arresting, being handed over to United States Army custody, in which he believed they were being physically abused in pursuance of information. A low point was reached during the deployment when the Commanding Officer of 22 Special Air Service Regiment, on a visit to Griffin's Squadron in Baghdad, expressed the view, openly to unit's personnel, that he himself had declining confidence in their mission, and that he was uneasy that they were in jeopardy of being turned in to a secret police force in the Iraqi state under United States authority. In consequence, whilst on leave in the United Kingdom, Griffin sought and obtained permission to resign from the British Army in 2005.

== Political activism ==
On leaving the British Army he was employed briefly in corporate security work, before becoming involved in anti-war activism. His initial public pronouncements involved a critique of the use of the British military to facilitate the foreign policy of the United States, but subsequently he broadened his criticism against what he perceives as a subliminal militaristic culture that is socially inherent in the United Kingdom.

In 2008 the British Government imposed an injunction upon Griffin to prevent him publicly discussing operations that he had been involved in whilst in Iraq in 2005, where he alleged that Iraqi civilian detainees were severely mistreated by the United States forces in pursuance of intelligence information, which the British military was complicit in.

Griffin is the Co-ordinator of the United Kingdom branch of Veterans for Peace.

In 2011 Griffin took part in a demonstration outside the American Embassy in London in support of Chelsea Manning, a United States Army soldier who had released a mass of classified military documents to public view via an internet outlet.

In April 2013 Griffin took part in a debate at the Oxford Union supporting the proposition "We will not fight for Queen and Country", during which he stated that patriotism is a "false religion", that was propagated self-servingly by influential elitist groups in society who financially benefited from it. He also stated that the professional British Army is composed primarily of the modern equivalent of men-at-arms, whose military service is motivated by other causes than patriotism, and the British Army's esprit de corps is "to go to war, any war" for self-possessed warlike motivation, rather than for more principled aspirations.

In March 2015, as a representative of Veterans for Peace, Griffin went to Northern Ireland to meet with ex-paramilitaries from the Provisional Irish Republican Army, including Seanna Breathnach. At the conclusion of the meeting Griffin and other representatives of Veterans for Peace expressed a new understanding of the IRA's perspective during The Troubles, and expressed remorse about aspects of their military service with the British Army during Operation Banner. The ex-IRA participants expressed in return a new understanding of the "programming" that the Veterans for Peace representatives had explained they had been subjected to in the British Army, but stated they shared no reciprocal regrets about their own activities in the conflict.

In December 2015 Griffin along with two other members of Veterans for Peace publicly discarded their military service medals and service berets, and renounced their military Oath of Allegiance outside the gates of Downing Street in a protest demonstration against the British Government's entry into the Syrian Civil War.

== See also ==
- List of peace activists
