= Catholic Worker Movement =

Autonomous communities of Catholics and their associates

- Logo/masthead used on the Catholic Worker Movement website and newspaper
- Formation: May 1, 1933; 93 years ago
- Founders: Dorothy Day; Peter Maurin
- Purpose: Catholic anarchist activism
- Members: 200 Catholic worker houses of hospitality and farms internationally (2023)
- Publication: Catholic Worker newspaper
- Website: catholicworker.org

The Catholic Worker Movement is a collection of autonomous communities founded by Dorothy Day and Peter Maurin in the United States in 1933. Its aim is to "live in accordance with the justice and charity of Jesus Christ". One of its guiding principles is hospitality towards those on the margin of society, based on the principles of communitarianism and personalism. To this end, the movement claims over 240 local Catholic Worker communities providing social services. Each house has a different mission, going about the work of social justice in its own way, suited to its local region.

Catholic Worker houses are not official organs of the Catholic Church, and their activities, inspired by Day's example, may be more or less overtly religious in tone and inspiration depending on the particular institution. The movement campaigns for nonviolence and is active in opposing both war and the unequal global distribution of wealth. Day also founded the Catholic Worker newspaper, still published by the two Catholic Worker houses in New York City, and sold for one cent a copy.

== History ==
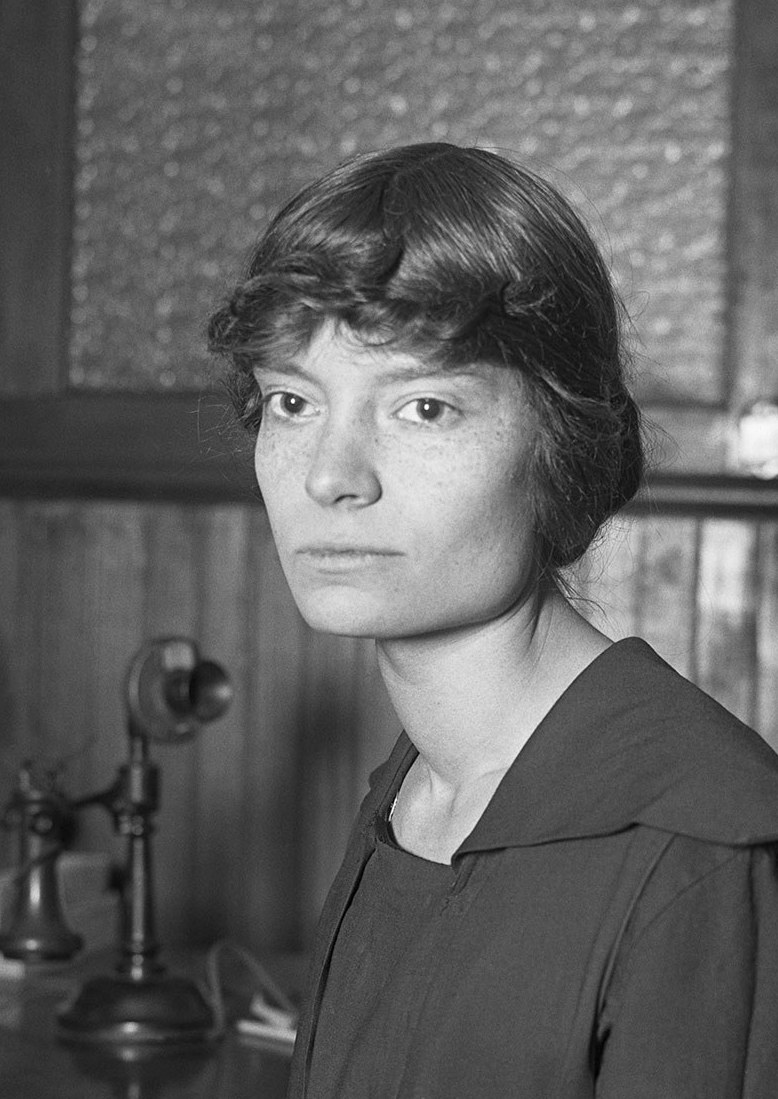
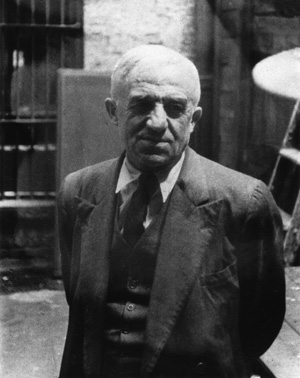
The founders of the movement, Dorothy Day and Peter Maurin

The Catholic Worker Movement started with the Catholic Worker newspaper, created by Dorothy Day to advance Catholic social teaching and be a neutral, Christian pacifist position in the war-torn 1930s. Day attempted to put her words from the Catholic Worker into action through "houses of hospitality" and then through a series of farms for people to live together on communes. The idea of voluntary poverty was advocated for those who volunteered to work at the houses of hospitality. Many people would come to the Catholic Workers for assistance, then becoming Workers themselves. Initially, these houses of hospitality had little organization and no requirements for membership. As time passed some basic rules and policies were established. Day appointed the directors of each of the houses, each of which operated autonomously and came to vary in size and character. In the 1930s, the St. Louis Workers served 3,400 people a day while the Detroit Workers served around 600 a day.

The Catholic Worker newspaper spread the idea to other cities in the United States, as well as to Canada and the United Kingdom, through the reports printed by those who had experienced working in the houses of hospitality. More than 30 independent but affiliated communities had been founded by 1941. Between 1965 and 1980 an additional 76 communities were founded with 35 of these still in existence today, such as the "Hippie Kitchen" founded in the back of a van by two Catholic Workers on Skid Row, Los Angeles in the 1970s. Well over 200 communities exist today, including several in Australia, the United Kingdom, Canada, Germany, the Netherlands, Mexico, New Zealand, and Sweden.

Day, who died in 1980, is under consideration for sainthood by the Catholic Church.

== Beliefs ==
"Our rule is the works of mercy," said Dorothy Day. "It is the way of sacrifice, worship, a sense of reverence."

According to co-founder Peter Maurin, the following are the beliefs of the Catholic Worker:

1. gentle personalism of traditional Catholicism.
2. personal obligation of looking after the needs of our brother.
3. daily practice of the Works of Mercy.
4. houses of hospitality for the immediate relief of those who are in need.
5. establishment of Farming Communes where each one works according to his ability and receives according to his need.
6. creating a new society within the shell of the old (Note: The concept of "a new society within the shell of the old" appeared in the preamble to the constitution of the IWW, though it was not given a religious rationale. Archived September 4, 2011, at the Wayback Machine) with the philosophy of the new.

The radical philosophy of the group can be described as Christian anarchism. Anne Klejment, a history lecturer at the University of St. Thomas, wrote of the movement:

The Catholic Worker considered itself a Christian anarchist movement. All authority came from God; and the state, having by choice distanced itself from Christian perfectionism, forfeited its ultimate authority over the citizen... Catholic Worker anarchism followed Christ as a model of nonviolent revolutionary behavior... He respected individual conscience. But he also preached a prophetic message, difficult for many of his contemporaries to embrace.

=== Family involvement ===
Families have had a variety of roles in the Catholic Worker Movement. Because those donating funds to the houses of hospitality were primarily interested in helping the poor, the higher cost of maintaining a volunteer family (as opposed to maintaining an individual volunteer) conflicted with the wishes of those donating. Author Daniel McKanan has suggested that, for a variety of reasons, Dorothy Day's perspective on family involvement in the movement was controversial. Despite these elements of conflict, families have participated in the Catholic Worker Movement through multiple avenues: some assist the houses of hospitality while others open up a "Christ room" in their homes for people in need. There are many other opportunities for family involvement in the Catholic Worker as well, with some families running their own houses of hospitality.

== Present day ==
Jessica Reznicek is a climate activist from the Des Moines Catholic Worker Community currently serving an eight-year prison sentence for acts of civil disobedience related to the Dakota Access Pipeline protests. She, along with another Catholic Worker, dismantled machinery along the pipeline route in an act of sabotage, delaying the pipeline construction by six months, though no one was hurt. She is designated a political prisoner/prisoner of war by the Anarchist Black Cross federation, and is also supported by the Jericho Movement, which works to release political prisoners held in custody in the US.

== List of prominent Catholic Workers ==
- Charlie Angus – Musician (L'Étranger, Grievous Angels), former Canadian New Democratic Party Member of Parliament
- Philip Berrigan – Catholic priest, peace activist
- Ade Bethune – Catholic liturgical artist
- David Dellinger – American peace activist
- Jim Dowling – Australian peace activist
- Robert Ellsberg – American religious publisher and author
- Jim Forest – American peace activist
- Michael Harrington – American writer and socialist
- Ammon Hennacy – American peace activist
- Martha Hennessy – American peace activist, granddaughter of Dorothy Day
- Kathy Kelly – American peace activist
- James Loney – Canadian peace activist
- Karl Meyer – American peace activist
- Martin Newell – Catholic priest, English peace activist
- Ciaron O'Reilly – Australian peace activist

== See also ==
- Catholic Radical Alliance
- Catholic social teaching
- Catholic trade unions
- Christian anarchism
- Christian communism
- Christian left
- Christian socialism
- Christian trade unions
- Christian views on poverty and wealth
- Catholicism and socialism
- Friendship House
- Georgism
- Industrial Workers of the World
- Liberation theology
- List of anti-war organizations
- Political Catholicism
- Settlement movement
- Saint Patrick's Day Four
- Pitstop Ploughshares

=== Similar Christian movements ===
- Anabaptism, in particular the emerging peace church movement
- Beguines and Beghards, medieval religious communities composed entirely of laity
- Christian democracy, particularly distributism
- Focolare, Catholic/Ecumenical movement promoting the ideals of unity and universal brotherhood.
- Madonna House Apostolate
- "New Monasticism" related communities
- Peace Churches
- Servants to Asia's Urban Poor
- Labour Church

== Sources ==
- McKanan, Daniel (March 2007a). "Inventing the Catholic Worker Family". Church History. 76 (1): 94. doi:10.1017/s0009640700101428. JSTOR 27644925. S2CID 162589205.
- McKanan, Daniel (April 2007b). "The Family, the Gospel, and the Catholic Worker". The Journal of Religion. 87 (2): 153–182. doi:10.1086/510646. JSTOR 10.1086/510646. S2CID 145471121.
- Piehl, Mel (1982). Breaking Bread: The Catholic Worker and the Origin of Catholic Radicalism in America. Philadelphia: Temple University Press. ISBN 9780877222576.
