= House of hospitality =

A house of hospitality or hospitality house, in the United States, is an organization to provide shelter, and often food and clothing, to those who need it. Originally part of the Catholic Worker Movement, houses of hospitality have been run by other organizations, including organizations that are not Catholic or Christian. Founded on principles of Christian anarchism, the houses provide hospitality without charge and without requiring religious practice or attendance at services. A variety known as a hospital hospitality house is for families displaced due to medical issues of a family member, and is often located near a medical center.

== History ==
During the Great Depression, Dorothy Day's Catholic Worker Movement (CWM) was concerned with the plight of the homeless. In 1933, the CWM opened the first House of Hospitality for women in New York. It could accommodate fifteen women, and it had heating and hot water. “The rent was paid by contributions from working girls in the parish of the Immaculate Conception Church, girls who themselves lived in cold water flats.”
