= Communist Party USA and American labor movement (1919–1937) =

The Communist Party USA and its allies played an important role in the United States labor movement, particularly in the 1930s and 1940s, but wasn't successful either in bringing the labor movement around to its agenda of fighting for socialism and full workers' control over industry, or in converting their influence in any particular union into membership gains for the Party. The CP has had only negligible influence in labor since its supporters' defeat in internal union political battles in the aftermath of World War II and the CIO's expulsion of the unions in which they held the most influence in 1950. After the expulsion of the Communists, organized labor in the United States began to decline.

Historians disagree why the union movement never formed a labor party and why American workers have never embraced socialist parties in any numbers in the last ninety years. Some have argued that a strain of American exceptionalism made U.S. workers resistant to parties that emphasized class struggle; others have attributed the left's failure to its own successes in building strong unions, but at the cost of downplaying its own political and social agendas for the sake of unity or short-term gains. Others take just the opposite position: that the left lost its power to lead the labor movement by its ideological zig-zags. The CP's history within the labor movement can support all of these theses.

== CPUSA's founding and early years ==
The Communist Party of the USA was founded in 1919, out of two groups who broke from the Socialist Party of America when it refused to join the Comintern. The original core of the CP believed that the triumph of the Bolshevik Revolution in Russia meant that the revolution was at hand in the West as well.

The CP's initial attitude towards unions reflected that millenarian view. At the time of its founding, according to a leader of the party, "it would have been difficult to gather a half dozen delegates who knew anything about the trade union movement." The Party also became a largely clandestine organization during the immediate post-war years, as the Palmer Raids led to the arrest and deportation of thousands of Party members.

The CP at that time looked on the American Federation of Labor as an enemy to be destroyed in order to eliminate the temptations of reformism rather than revolution. They also looked down on most trade union activities as insufficiently revolutionary: even though the labor movement was engaged in a number of strikes in 1919, including a general strike in Seattle, Washington, the Party's members had no role in them. Instead they urged workers to put aside their short-term economic goals and to concentrate on overthrowing the state.

The Profintern, or "Red International of Labor Unions," forced the CP to change in 1921, when it directed U.S. communists to work within the AFL in order to make it a revolutionary body – what an earlier generation of SP members referred to as "boring from within." In order to accomplish this, the Profintern recognized the Trade Union Educational League, an organization founded by William Z. Foster, as its U.S. affiliate.

Foster had been, prior to his agreement to bring the TUEL under the wing of the CP, a syndicalist, who believed that workers would seize power through workers' organizations, such as unions, rather than through political organizations, such as a communist party. He had led the AFL's failed 1919 strike in the steel industry and had established particularly close relations then with John Fitzpatrick, the President of the Chicago Federation of Labor.

TUEL functioned within existing unions, trying to organize support for industrial unionism, a labor party, organizing the unorganized and the Soviet Union. TUEL strove to create alliances with leaders who shared some of its agenda, while trying to build a base for left unionism at the local level.

After some organizational successes, however, TUEL managed to alienate Fitzpatrick, leaving them without major allies when the AFL denounced TUEL as a "dual union" and expelled TUEL members in 1924. The CPUSA lost more allies when, under orders from the Comintern, it withdrew its previous enthusiastic support for the Progressive Party candidacy of Robert La Follette, Sr. for president in 1924.

The CP, on the other hand, had some short-lived successes in the labor movement without the TUEL's help. The CP had broad support in the early 1920s among the radical, largely immigrant, garment workers in New York City. A number of CP members won leadership positions in three major International Ladies' Garment Workers' Union (ILGWU) locals in New York City in 1924 and offices in other locals in Boston, Chicago and Philadelphia. They held on to those offices despite the attempts by the Socialist leadership of the ILGWU to oust them.

But in 1926 the left leadership in New York forfeited everything they had when they lost a strike of 40,000 cloakmakers. The local union leadership lost the strike in large part because of the internal factionalism within the CP: when the union had the opportunity to settle on terms that were less than what the union had demanded, the union's leaders went to the CP for approval of the deal. But the Party's fraction within the union was reluctant to accept it, afraid that this would open them up to charges of softness in intra-Party factional warfare. The strike dragged on another few months, at which point the locals accepted an inferior agreement.

That gave the International union the opportunity it needed: the Socialist leadership of the ILGWU took over the exhausted locals after they settled and their supporters were too dispirited to resist. While the CP retained a strong base of support in the smaller Fur Workers Union, it never recovered from its defeat in the much larger garment industry; on the contrary, the ILGWU, led by David Dubinsky for the next forty years, remained resolutely anti-communist thereafter.

The TUEL itself changed for brief period into the dual union that the AFL had accused it of being. The TUEL led a strike of woolen industry workers in Passaic, New Jersey in 1926 — until, that is, the Comintern instructed the Party later that year to abandon any independent unions it had formed on the ground that these represented ultra-left adventurism. The strike, which would probably have been lost in any case, ended six months later in defeat after the AFL's United Textile Workers took over leadership of the strike.

== CPUSA turns left and the Trade Union Unity League ==
The Comintern's repudiation of dual unionism in 1926 turned out, however, to be only a temporary change in policy; in 1928 the CP began establishing new CP-led unions in the coal, textile, food and garment industries and renamed the TUEL the Trade Union Unity League in 1929. This change in policy coincided with Stalin's turn to the left as he moved against his former ally Nikolai Bukharin. CP leaders, such as Foster, willing to make the switch, held on to their positions in the Party, while those who did not, such as Jay Lovestone, were expelled.

The CP's Third Period stance towards unions was nearly as ultra-left as its position in 1919 through 1921. While advocating a "united front from below," the Party attacked other socialist parties as "social fascists" and denounced the AFL as "an organ to suppress and disorganize the masses" which workers should join only to "overthrow the reformist bureaucracy" that ran them. The CP instead focused on founding new revolutionary unions in the expectation that the collapse of capitalism was just around the corner.

These new dual unions were, in fact, often more like ginger groups than unions, with few members and even fewer long-term members. Nonetheless these groups did make some heroic efforts to organize the unorganized. In 1929 the National Textile Workers led a strike of thousands of textile workers in Gastonia, North Carolina, who walked out, despite the NTW's attempts to hold them back, after management fired five union activists. That strike was crushed after mobs of citizens smashed up union offices and murdered a union activist.

While local authorities, preachers and newspapers played up the National Textile Workers' association with godless communism and its opposition to white supremacy, it is unlikely that this made much difference in the final analysis. The authorities reacted just as violently when the much less radical AFL intervened after a spontaneous strike of textile workers erupted in other mill towns several months later. That strike likewise ended in mass arrests and the killing of three strikers, shot in the back by sheriffs.

=== Miners' unions ===
The CP's efforts in mining were just as unsuccessful. The CP had once had a good deal of support in the internecine struggles within the United Mine Workers in the 1920s, when John L. Lewis used every weapon available to defeat his rivals for union leadership while wages and working conditions in the industry grew worse. The TUEL-supported candidate who ran for UMW President against Lewis in the 1924 election was credited with 66,000 votes in the official tally – nearly half what Lewis received. The CP later allied itself, for a time, with John Brophy, whose "Save the Union" slate probably would have won election to national leadership in 1926 if the vote had been held democratically.

Lewis, however, effectively drove all of the TUEL and Brophy supporters from the union after his victory in 1926. The CP later burned its bridges with Brophy, denouncing him as a reformist.

The CP founded its own National Miners Union in 1928. It engaged in a fierce struggle to undo wage cuts when miners struck in Pennsylvania and Ohio mines in 1931, but lost the strike when mine operators chose to recognize the UMW – which had not been involved in the strike – rather than the NMU, then obtained an injunction to prevent the NMU from picketing.

The NMU also took on the leadership of a strike that the UMW had called in Harlan County, Kentucky in 1931 with even more disastrous results, since the union was not prepared to provide the relief necessary to permit strikers to remain out for any length of time, particularly in the face of attacks by "gun thugs." The NMU's strong opposition to racial discrimination and wholehearted support for the Soviet Union also served to alienate it from the mostly fundamentalist and predominantly white miners in Harlan County. While the strike publicized the horrific conditions in one of the most isolated parts of Appalachia, it did not produce any concrete benefits for striking miners.

There were, however, some bright spots for the CP: their Food Workers Industrial Union successfully organized cafeteria and restaurant workers, particularly in New York, where many of the restaurant workers unions had been taken over by Dutch Schultz as part of his labor rackets. Those CP-led unions not only fended off Schultz's gangsters, but thrived, and became dominant within the AFL Hotel Employees and Restaurant Employees union in New York when they affiliated with it several years later.

The Maritime Workers Industrial Union did not survive the Third Period, but it left its mark. Sailors and longshoremen had a tradition of radical politics and more or less spontaneous job actions; the IWW had been particularly active in both east and west coast ports up through the 1920s. The Marine Workers Industrial Union (MWIU) organized occasional strikes, attacked the inadequate relief provided for unemployed workers by the YMCA and other groups, and distributed the MWIU's newspapers. These programs attracted a number of sailors and longshoremen, including Harry Bridges, who subsequently led the west coast longshore strike of 1934.

The TUUL had similar limited success in the automobile industry, where it established shop nuclei that linked the Party with the campaign for industrial unionism. The CP was, however, more successful in organizing unemployed workers in Detroit and other auto centers than it was in recruiting or organizing auto workers.

== Early years of the New Deal and founding of the CIO ==
The CP initially looked on the New Deal and the Roosevelt administration as a form of fascism, because the National Industrial Recovery Act provided for a form of corporativist rule, calling on industries to negotiate codes that would regulate prices, production, labor relations and other matters with only indirect government supervision. The government panels created under the NRA generally gave in to employer demands and appeared to be more concerned with preventing strikes than with protecting workers' rights or living standards.

Workers flocked to unions for representation, often in advance of any union organizing efforts, in the belief that Roosevelt and the NRA would protect them. Lewis and the UMWA capitalized on this sentiment in 1933 when his organizers told miners that "The President wants you to join the Union." While the UMWA organizers may have meant President Lewis, they did not correct the misimpression on the part of many miners who thought they meant President Roosevelt.

Workers engaged in a wave of strikes, the most since 1921, in 1934. The largest and most significant were three giant strikes for union recognition among longshoremen on the West Coast, truck drivers in Minneapolis, Minnesota and automobile workers in Toledo, Ohio. In each case the strike became either a general strike or something close to it.

In each case radicals, either associated with the CPUSA or other leftwing parties, played key leadership roles; the CP and its allies, such as Harry Bridges, played an important role in the west coast longshore strike. The CP's influence depended, however, on the personal charisma of Harry Bridges and the hard work put in by its members and sympathizers on the docks, rather than on the MWIU itself, which largely disappeared when its radical cadres followed the membership into the newly revived west coast locals of the ILA. While Bridges was apparently never a member of the CP — something the government tried to prove, without success, in four different trials over more than a decade — he worked closely with Party activists and helped advance their careers within the union, while the union that grew out of the strike, the International Longshoremen and Warehousemen Union, espoused the party's politics for decades.

The Party's role in the founding of the Transport Workers Union of America was even clearer: two TUUL organizers, John Santo and Austin Hogan, were instrumental in the founding of the union in 1934, and almost all of its original leaders, including Mike Quill, were either Party members or close followers of Party policies. The TWU won the right to represent New York City's public transit workers after several years of clandestine organizing, a series of small strikes, a sitdown strike in the BMT's Kent Avenue powerhouse in 1937 and an overwhelming victory among IRT employees in an NLRB election several months later.

Yet while the CP played a leading role in that organization, Party members, even those whose party membership had been open in the past, chose to downplay or conceal their membership. Hogan, a CP candidate for Congress in 1934, kept his party affiliation private, to the extent that was possible, after he became President of TWU Local 100, the local of New York City subway workers. The party discontinued its shop papers, which went by names such as "Red Dynamo" and "Red Express", in 1935, when TWU organizers claimed that the party's overt role in the union was interfering with their efforts and when Popular Front alliance-building replaced Third Period separatism. While the party remained influential — some said dominant — in the union until 1949, and the union closely followed party policies on issues such as civil rights, public ownership of the subways and fare increases, the party took no credit for its contributions and party members vigorously rejected claims of employers, intra-union opponents and investigators that the party was, in fact, a major influence in the union.

=== CIO ===
The CP similarly gained influence at first in the newly formed Congress of Industrial Organizations, or CIO, on the strength of individual members' work. Lee Pressman, the General Counsel for the CIO and later the United Steelworkers of America, was a member of the CP and the underground Ware group involved in espionage for the Soviet Union. The first publicity director for the CIO, Len De Caux, was likewise a member of the CP throughout his years with the CIO as were many more organizers and rank-and-file activists within the unions affiliated with the CIO.

Individuals like Pressman and De Caux would not have considered working for the CIO if the CP had not shifted its position from sectarian purity to first a united front and later a popular front policy that favored alliances with other "progressive forces." At the same time the New Deal was turning to the left, in response to both the increasingly hostile response by employers and the wave of worker discontent that had replaced the apathetic resignation of the first years of the Great Depression. The CP, having denounced Roosevelt as a fascist only a few years earlier, moved closer and closer to embracing him.

At the same time the CIO and other progressive organizations and individuals overcome many of their reservations about working with the CP. Of the two hundred or so organizers that Lewis hired for the Steel Workers Organizing Committee, sixty were CP members, with particular strength among the staff responsible for organizing foreign-born and African-American workers and in the Chicago area.

Lewis was not particularly concerned with the political beliefs of his organizers, so long as he controlled the organization. As he once famously remarked, "I do not turn my organizers or CIO members upside down and shake them to see what kind of literature falls out of their pockets." He took the same line in private, when David Dubinsky of the ILGWU asked him about the communists on the SWOC staff; as he told Dubinsky, "Who gets the bird? The hunter or the dog?"

== Organizing basic industry ==
The CP did not gain influence solely through seeking staff positions, however. In the rubber workers' strike in Akron, Ohio that represented the first test of the CIO's ability to turn mass discontent into union gains, a number of rank-and-file leaders were also CP members. The Party had a degree of presence, both at the local and international level, in the United Rubber Workers union formed after the strike.

The CP also exerted a great deal of influence within the United Electrical, Radio and Machine Workers of America (or UE), founded in 1936 by the merger of a number of federal unions created by the AFL and small shop caucuses, largely made up of CP activists and other socialists and radicals, at General Electric, Westinghouse Electric Company and other unorganized companies. The CP grew even more powerful within the UE in 1937 when James J. Matles, former head of the CP's Metal Workers Industrial Union, brought in a number of locals after a brief affiliation with the International Association of Machinists. Matles and other CP members and allies held the bulk of the important positions within the UE for the next twelve years, until the CIO engineered a split within it in order to separate the Communist leaders from the CIO; they continued to hold power thereafter within that portion of the union that was not raided by the International Union of Electrical Workers.

=== United Auto Workers ===
The CP achieved even greater results, but less long-term success, working within the United Automobile Workers. Like the UE, the UAW was also formed in 1936 out of a number of federal unions created by the AFL and locals from other unions in the industry. Of its 25,000 workers, almost all came from outside Michigan.

One of the most prominent UAW activists in the early years of the union was Wyndham Mortimer, who had led a strike against White Motors in Cleveland, Ohio. Mortimer was elected vice-president at the UAW's first convention and might have been elected president if not for concern about his Party membership.

Mortimer and the CP formed alliances at that first convention with George Addes, then the secretary-treasurer of the UAW, later its president, and Walter Reuther, who headed the UAW from 1947 until his death in 1970. The CP maintained its alliance with Addes, the center of the left-wing caucus within the UAW, for the next decade. Its alliance with Reuther proved much shorter.

When the UAW decided to organize the industry by going after General Motors, Mortimer was sent to Flint, Michigan, where GM's production was centered. Even at that early stage factional infighting within the UAW, in particular between Mortimer and Homer Martin, the first President of the UAW, threatened to derail the campaign. When Martin pulled Mortimer out of Flint, Mortimer arranged for Bob Travis, another union activist and CP member from Toledo, to replace him.

Travis played an active role in the Flint Sit-Down Strike, aided by some veteran CP autoworkers inside Fisher Body Plant #1 – but also by other radical workers, some belonging to Trotskyist parties, the Socialist Party or the IWW. The same pattern applied outside the plants: Socialist Party members, such as Walter Reuther's brothers Victor Reuther and Roy Reuther, and the Socialists and ex-Socialists working for the CIO cooperated with CP members, such as Henry Kraus, the UAW's publicity director, with a minimum of sectarian bickering.

The CP, in fact, played down its revolutionary politics during the sit-down strike. In part this was to avoid giving GM and its allies an issue to use against the strike; in part it was out of fear of distancing the Party from the strikers, who were, in the opinion of CP leadership, using revolutionary means to achieve traditional union goals. The Socialists, by contrast, had a much smaller base within the striking workers, but were much more inclined to attach revolutionary significance to the sit-down strikes and to magnify their own role in them.

=== Steelworkers ===
The CP was even more circumspect in the Steel Workers Organizing Committee. The CP was anxious not to scare off its partners and employers in the CIO: its members therefore made no effort to advertise their Party affiliation and even took steps not to pack SWOC conventions.

Nor did circumstances give them much opportunity to rise to leadership. Unlike the UAW, which was born out of tumultuous struggles in which CP activists and other radicals played leading parts, the SWOC conducted a much more top-down organizing campaign subject to close control. SWOC organizers who belonged to the CP played an important role in recruiting and organizing members, but rarely stayed in one area long enough to cultivate the sort of relations with local leaders that might have allowed them to recruit them into the Party, if they had tried to do so. They simply did not have the freedom of action that Mortimer, Travis and others within the UAW did.

Nor did they have the same power. As staff members, Pressman, de Caux and the SWOC organizers who belonged to the CP had, at most, only indirect influence on CIO or SWOC policy and no independent base to rally support or propagandize for other issues. Philip Murray, a former UMWA associate whom Lewis installed as head of the SWOC, weeded out most of the Communists from the union over the years after the initial organizing drives as the SWOC became the United Steelworkers of America. By 1942 the purge was almost complete.

== See also ==
- 1933 Funsten Nut strike
- Communists in the U.S. Labor Movement (1937-1950)
- Industrial Workers of the World
