= US Labor Against Racism and War =

American anti-war anti-racisn organization

- USLARW logo
- Formation: January 11, 2003; 23 years ago
- Defunct: 2023; 3 years ago

US Labor Against Racism and War (USLARW), previously named US Labor Against the War (USLAW), was an anti-war, anti-racist labor organization in the United States. USLAW formed in 2003 to oppose the invasion of Iraq and became defunct in 2023.

Notable members included Michael Letwin, Amy Newell, and Nancy Wohlforth.

== Ideology ==
USLAW sought to connect domestic US labor demands with opposition to US wars abroad. For example, in 2005, USLAW stated: "This is not an 'extra issue.' [....] We cannot achieve any of labor's goals[,] such as major health care and pension reform, the government-funded rebuilding of the Gulf Coast[, or] the strengthening of our endangered public services, without ending this war."

== History ==
In January 2003, more than 100 delegates from unions representing more than 2 million members founded USLAW at a Chicago convention.

In 2005, the AFL-CIO convention passed "Resolution 53: The War in Iraq", which demanded that the United States "bring" its soldiers "home rapidly" from Iraq. The resolution passed overwhelmingly. This was the first time that the AFL-CIO had ever opposed US foreign policy. USLAW was essential to the passage of this resolution. At the AFL-CIO convention, USLAW whipped at least 150 delegates to oppose moderate language promoted by the conservative AFL-CIO leadership. Since 2005, the AFL-CIO has repeatedly passed anti-war resolutions, including in 2009 ("Resolution 52: Bring All the Troops and Contractors Home!"), 2013 ("Resolution 25: International Labor Solidarity Is More Than a Slogan"), and 2017 ("Resolution 50: War Is Not the Answer").

In 2010, USLAW endorsed The Good Soldier.

In 2020, following the George Floyd protests, USLAW renamed itself to US Labor Against Racism and War.

== National conventions ==
Name	Location	Date	Notes
2016 National Assembly	Silver Spring, Maryland	April 15–17, 2016	Convention call; Resolutions; Reportback
3rd National Assembly	Chicago, Illinois	December 4–6, 2009	Convention call; Interview with Hassan Jumaa Awad of the Federation of Oil Unions in Iraq
2nd National Assembly	Cleveland, Ohio	December 1–3, 2006	Decisions
National Labor Assembly for Peace	Chicago, Illinois	October 24–25, 2004	Convention call; Press release; Report
Founding Convention	Chicago, Illinois	January 11, 2003	

== See also ==
- United Electrical, Radio and Machine Workers of America
- Labor Against War
