= Boulware =

Boulware is a surname. It may refer to:

People

- Ben Boulware (born 1994), American football player
- Bill Boulware, American television producer of One on One (TV series), co-creator of 227 (TV series)
- Caldwell Elwood Boulware (1909–1990), long time mathematics professor at North Carolina Central University, active in the American civil rights movement in the south, first African American Trustee at Duke University, elected to multiple terms of the Durham, NC City Council
- John Boulware, American settler (1850s) of Nebraska City, Nebraska, United States
- J. W. Boulware, first commander (1944) of the USS Heywood L. Edwards (DD-663)
- Harold R. Boulware (1913–1983), American judge, most famous for being on the team with Thurgood Marshal that won Brown v. Board of Education
- Lemuel Boulware (1895–1990), V.P. of G.E. who lent his name to "Boulwarism".
- Mark Boulware, American Ambassador to Mauritania (see Mauritania-United States relations)
- Michael Boulware (born 1981), American football player, brother of Peter Boulware
- Peter Boulware (born 1974), American football player
- William Boulware, United States Ambassador to Italy in the 1840s
- William Boulware Jr. (1958–2022), American professional wrestler known as Rocky King
- Colonel William T. Boulware, killer (1843) of Peter Whetstone in Marshall, Texas, United States

Other

- Boulware Cemetery in Franklin Township, Bourbon County, Kansas, United States
- Boulware Dormitory, Barber-Scotia College, Concord, North Carolina
- Boulware Springs Water Works, historic site in Gainesville, Florida, United States
