= 1949 Calvary Cemetery strike =

Labor action in Queens, New York City

- Date: January 13 – March 12, 1949 (1 month, 3 weeks and 6 days)
- Location: Queens, New York City, New York, United States
- Goals: Reduction in workweek from 48 to 40 hours
- Methods: Picketing; Strike action
- Result: Workers change affiliation from the Congress of Industrial Organizations to the American Federation of Labor; Workers accept an 8.3% wage increase after strikebreakers are brought in

Parties
United Cemetery Workers Union Local 293	Archdiocese of New York: Trustees of St. Patrick's Cathedral

The 1949 Calvary Cemetery strike was a labor strike involving gravediggers and other workers at the Calvary Cemetery in Queens, New York City. The strike began on January 13 and ended on March 12.

The strike began after labor negotiations between the trustees of St. Patrick's Cathedral (the administrators of the cemetery, which was owned by the Archdiocese of New York) and members of United Cemetery Workers Union Local 293 reached an impasse. The union had been pushing for a reduction in their workweek from 48 hours Monday through Saturday to 40 hours Monday through Friday at the same weekly pay, which the trustees countered with slight pay increases and no changes in hours. As a result, about 250 workers at Calvary went on strike, garnering support from left-leaning Catholic groups and activists including the Association of Catholic Trade Unionists, the Catholic Worker newspaper, and activists John C. Cort, Dorothy Day, and Peter Maurin.

Church officials took a hardline stance against the union. This was especially true of noted anti-communist Cardinal Francis Spellman, then-archbishop of the archdiocese. Cardinal Spellman attempted to break the strike by employing red-baiting tactics against the local union's parent union, the Congress of Industrial Organizations-affiliated Food, Tobacco, Agricultural, and Allied Workers. In late February, Cardinal Spellman offered the strikers an 8% raise if they returned to work without union affiliation; the strikers rejected this offer. With important Catholic events approaching, on March 2, Cardinal Spellman brought in 100 students from St. Joseph's Seminary to act as strikebreakers. Shortly thereafter, the strikers changed their union affiliation to an American Federation of Labor-affiliated union and agreed to return to work on March 12. In the end, the strikers received an 8.3% wage increase, though without a change to their schedules.

== Background ==
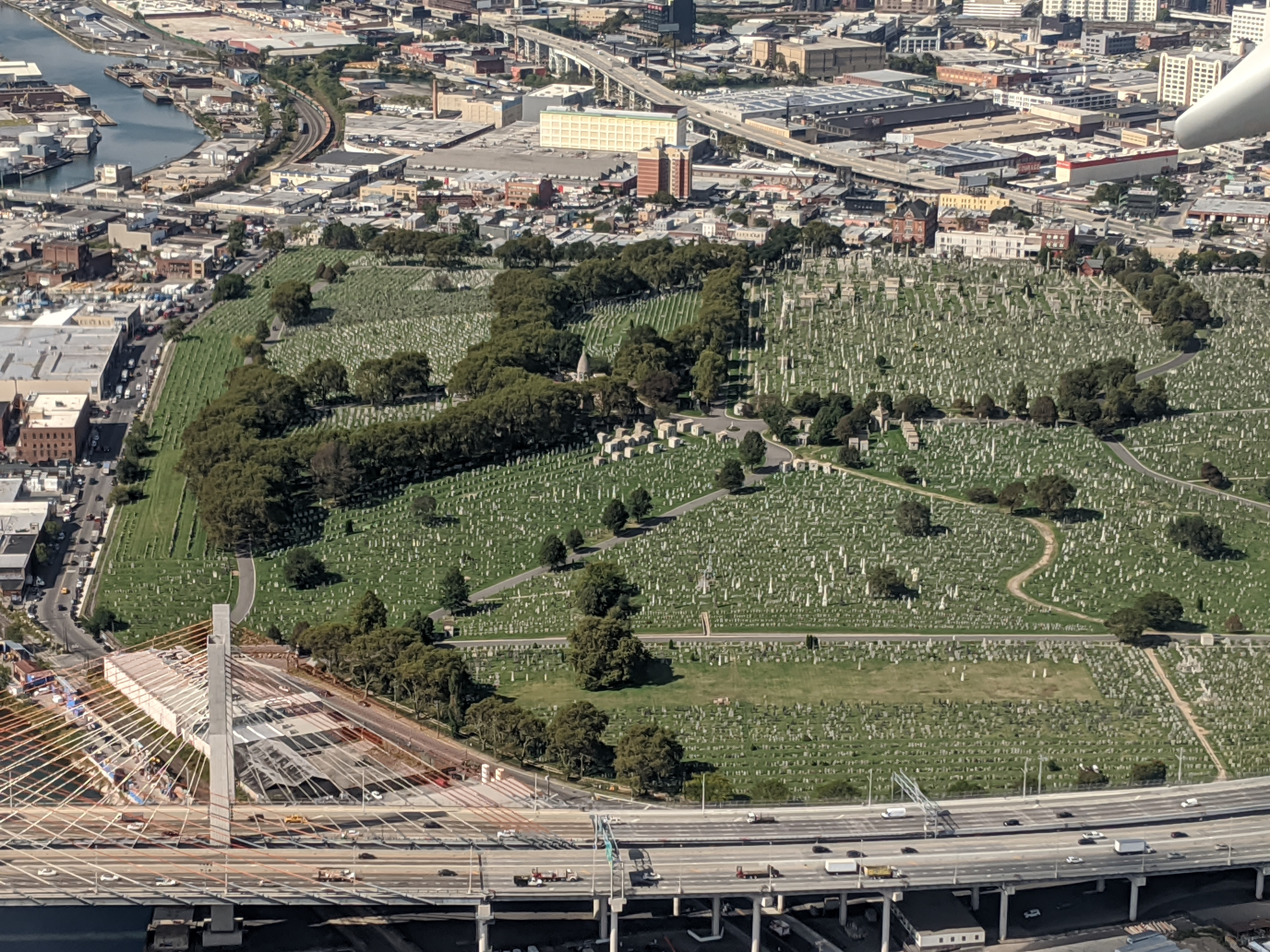
Aerial view of part of the cemetery in 2020

Calvary Cemetery is a large cemetery located in the Queens borough of New York City. By 1949, the cemetery (owned by the Archdiocese of New York and administered by the trustees of St. Patrick's Cathedral in Manhattan) was one of the largest Catholic cemeteries in the United States. By that time, the cemetery covered several hundred acres (Note: Sources vary on the exact size of the cemetery, with values of 400 acres (160 ha) and 550 acres (220 ha).) and had almost 2 million interments, with approximately 10,000 additional burials per year. Cardinal Francis Spellman was the archbishop of the archdiocese and presided over the trustees of St. Patrick's, having risen to that position in 1939 and being made cardinal in 1946. As both a cardinal and archbishop, he was considered the most powerful and well-known prelate of the Catholic Church in the United States. In 1946, with Cardinal Spellman's blessing, workers at Calvary Cemetery unionized with Local 293 of the United Cemetery Workers Union (UCW). (Note: In addition to Calvary Cemetery, Local 293 represented workers ten other cemeteries in the New York metropolitan area. In 1949, the local had a total membership of about 1,100, of which several hundred worked at Calvary.) This union was affiliated with the Food, Tobacco, Agricultural, and Allied Workers (FTA) of the Congress of Industrial Organizations (CIO), a leftist national union. Almost all of the Local 293 members were Catholics.

Throughout 1948, relations between the workers and their employers deteriorated, and on December 27 of that year, union representatives submitted a proposal to management for changes in working conditions. Of primary concern, the union was seeking a reduction in their workweek from 48 hours to 40 hours, with 8-hour shifts Monday through Friday. Additionally, they were seeking an increase in hourly pay so that they would still be receiving the same weekly pay of $59.40. Additionally, workers would receive overtime and time-and-a-half pay for Saturday work. The St. Patrick's trustees, taking a hardline stance against the union from the beginning of discussions, countered that Saturday work was necessitated by the numerous weekend funeral services and instead offered a 2.6% cost of living adjustment. Church and union officials met for two separate collective bargaining sessions, with the final held on January 10. During the last meeting, church representatives Monsignor George C. Ehardt and attorney Godfrey P. Schmidt made the union a final offer, after which they refused to entertain any further counteroffers from the union. Additionally during negotiations, Cardinal Spellman, a noted anti-communist, wrote front-page opinion pieces for almost every major newspaper in New York City about how the CIO was "a well-known Communist dominated union". With both sides at an impasse, approximately 250 Local 293 workers (composed of chauffeurs, gardeners, gravediggers, and mechanics) at Calvary went on strike on January 13, 1949. This marked the first recorded instance of a labor strike conducted by Catholic laity against Catholic clergy.

== Course of the strike ==
Starting on January 13, strikers began picketing outside of St. Patrick's Cathedral. The day after the strike began, 35 burials at the cemetery were postponed on account of the strike. Early on, the strike received the support of several leftist Catholic groups. The Association of Catholic Trade Unionists (ACTU) voiced their support of the strike in defiance of Cardinal Spellman, who was a noted donator to that organization, and ACTU member and noted Christian socialist John C. Cort picketed with strikers. As a result of their support of the strike, Cardinal Spellman would later stop his annual $3,000 donation to the group. In addition, the Catholic Worker newspaper, led by activists Dorothy Day and Peter Maurin, supported the strike, with the newspaper's headquarter building on the Lower East Side also housing a soup kitchen and lodging house for strikers in need. In addition, the newspaper published articles that were supportive of the strike and Day wrote several times to Cardinal Spellman arguing that the strikers were justified in their actions.

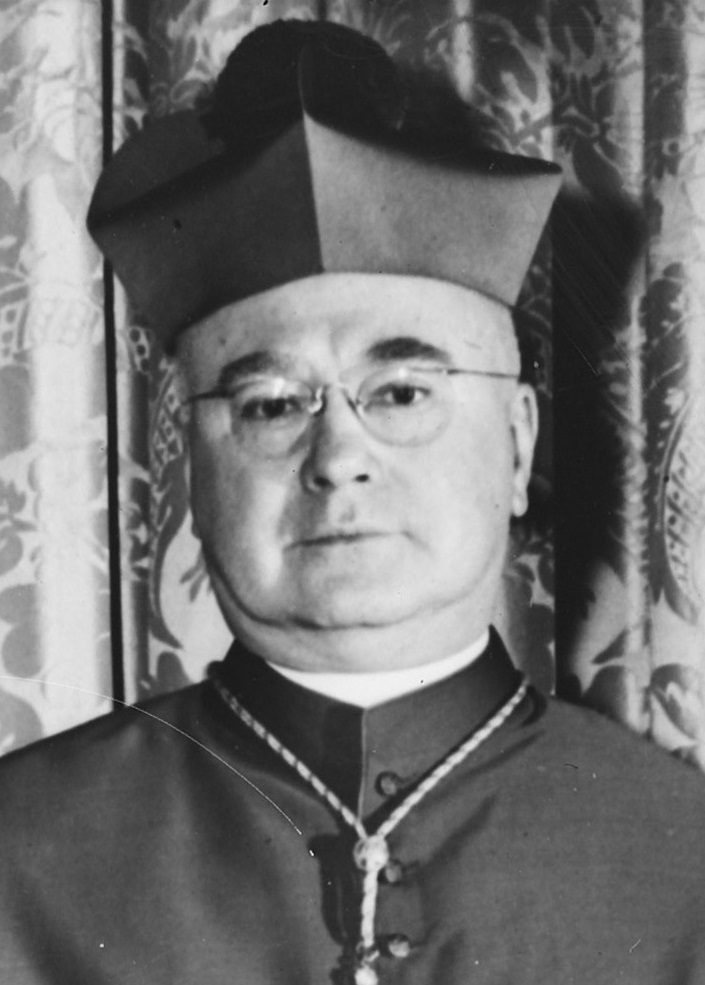
Cardinal Francis Spellman (pictured 1946), the archbishop of New York during the strike

While union officials requested third party government arbitration, Schmidt countered by offering to have three theologians from outside of the archdiocese arbitrate the strike under the question of "Is the present strike morally justified?" These offers were turned down by union officials, who argued that the strike was due to economic rather than theological or moral issues. On January 21, Ehardt sent a letter to the strikers arguing that union officials were to blame for the strike and threatened the strikers with possible job replacement. However, by mid-February, the strike was continuing and over 1,000 dead bodies were being stored in temporary vaults at Calvary Cemetery. In addition, strike action had spread to 47 Local 293 gravediggers at the Gate of Heaven Cemetery in Hawthorne, New York, which was also owned by the archdiocese. With important Catholic events such as the city's St. Patrick's Day parade and the Easter season approaching, Cardinal Spellman took on a more active role in trying to end the strike. Starting on February 18, Cardinal Spellman tried to appeal to the workers to return to work as individuals, without the union, and on February 28, at a meeting of union members he had called for, he stated that the workers would receive an 8% salary increase if they returned to work by noon of the following day without union membership. However, the union members rejected the offer. At the same time, Cardinal Spellman attempted to hurt public support for the strike by employing red-baiting, criticizing the CIO as a "Communist-affiliated" union. Additionally, church officials began seeking an injunction from the New York Supreme Court against the strikers.

=== Strikebreakers brought in ===
On March 2, union officials informed Cardinal Spellman that they would not return to work except as continued members of their current union, affiliated with the FTA, as union members earlier that day had voted 183 to 0 against quitting their membership in that union. As a result, in the early morning of March 3, Cardinal Spellman brought 100 students from St. Joseph's Seminary in Yonkers, New York to act as strikebreakers and bury the 1,020 dead bodies in storage at Calvary. Cardinal Spellman stated that he would do the same at Gate of Heaven. According to a later report of the strike, the seminarians were caught off guard when they realized they had been called by the archbishop to act as gravediggers, and the strikers were also caught off guard by the action. Picketers at the cemetery taunted the seminarians and priests with calls of "strikebreakers", and when seminarians returned the following day to continue gravedigging, a spokesman for the union, speaking to the Brooklyn Eagle newspaper, said, "We support the seminary. But to allow the seminary to take the bread and butter out of our mouths is wrong. They are strikebreakers." The seminarians continued to work as gravediggers for several days, and on March 4, Local 293 members reversed their earlier decision and agreed to disaffiliate with the FTA. In addition, union members took an anti-communist oath as Cardinal Spellman contended that he would continue to use strikebreakers for as long as was necessary. In response to the action, a representative for the ACTU said, "With all reverence and respect for the cardinal, it is more important to recognize the right of workers to organize and bargain collectively in unions of their own choosing, and to pay the living a just wage, than to bury the dead." Within a week of the seminarians being brought in, gravediggers on strike at Calvary voted to unionize as Local 365 of the American Federation of Labor-affiliated Building Service Employees International Union, with this announcement made on March 11. Cardinal Spellman was happy in the change of union affiliation, and the striking workers returned to work on March 12, a Saturday. Ultimately, the workers received an 8.3% wage increase and a check for $65 from Cardinal Spellman for "hardships" sustained during the strike, while the seminarians who had worked as gravediggers were given a sightseeing tour of Washington, D.C.

== See also ==
- 1973 New York City gravediggers' strike

== Sources ==
- Anderson, Dana (2007). Identity's Strategy: Rhetorical Selves in Conversion. Columbia, South Carolina: University of South Carolina Press. ISBN 978-1-57003-706-1 – via Google Books.
- Cort, John C. (2003). Dreadful Conversions: The Making of a Catholic Socialist. New York City: Fordham University Press. ISBN 978-0-8232-2256-8 – via Google Books.
- Gregory, David (2006). "Dorothy Day (1897–1980)". In Witte Jr., John; Alexander, Frank S. (eds.). The Teachings of Modern Christianity on Law, Politics, & Human Nature. Vol. I. New York City: Columbia University Press. pp. 190–219. ISBN 978-0-231-13358-6 – via Google Books.
- Hayes, Patrick J. (2011). "Estote Firmi: New York's Local Church under Cardinal Spellman's Watch - Some Foundations for an Intellectual Journey". In Denny, Christopher D.; McMahon, Christopher (eds.). Finding Salvation in Christ: Essays on Christology and Soteriology in Honor of William P. Loewe. Eugene, Oregon: Pickwick Publications. pp. 23–48. ISBN 978-1-60608-638-4 – via Google Books.
- Sparr, Arnold (Summer 2008). ""The Most Memorable Labor Dispute in the History of U.S. Church-Related Institutions": The 1949 Calvary Cemetery Workers' Strike against the Catholic Archdiocese of New York". American Catholic Studies. 119 (2). American Catholic Historical Society: 1–33. ISSN 2161-8542. JSTOR 44195067.
- "Strike Suspends Calvary Burials". The New York Times. January 14, 1949. ISSN 0362-4331. Archived from the original on June 29, 2021.
- "Gate of Heaven Cemetery Struck". The New York Times. February 11, 1949. ISSN 0362-4331. Archived from the original on March 10, 2018.
- "Religion: Strike in the Graveyard". Time. March 14, 1949. ISSN 0040-781X. Archived from the original on June 29, 2021.
