= 1969–1970 General Electric strike =

Labor dispute in the United States

- Date: October 27, 1969 – February 7, 1970
- Location: United States
- Methods: Strikes, protests, demonstrations
- Result: Union victory

Parties
United Electrical Workers (UE); International Union of Electrical Workers (IUE)	General Electric

The 1969–1970 General Electric strike was a nationwide labor dispute between General Electric and its workers as represented by the AFL–CIO affiliated International Union of Electrical Workers (IUE) and the independent United Electrical Workers (UE). Involving 164,000 workers on average, it was the largest and most impactful strike in North America in 1969 in terms of the number of days lost. It began on October 27, 1969, and was won by the workers after 102 days on the picket line. The strike brought together the two rival unions in the most meaningful way since UE was expelled from the Congress of Industrial Organizations (CIO) in 1949.

== Impact ==
UE and IUE led an alliance of unions which broke the back of Boulwarism, GE's aggressive 20-year-long policy of "take-it-or-leave-it" bargaining. Boulwarism was named for Lemuel Boulware, the company's vice president of labor and community relations, who devised the strategy in reaction to UE's success in the 1946 strike, and to capitalize on the bitter divisions, after 1949, in the ranks of GE union members.

In 2012, Business Insider named it one of the most expensive strikes in United States history.
