= The Good Soldier (disambiguation) =

The Good Soldier is a 1915 novel by Ford Madox Ford.

The Good Soldier may also refer to:

== Film and television ==
- The Good Soldier (1981 film), a 1981 television film adapted from the novel
- The Good Soldier (2009 film), a 2009 documentary film by Lexy Lovell and Michael Uys
- "The Good Soldier" (Homeland), an episode of Homeland
- "The Good Soldier" (Grimm), an episode of Grimm
- "Good Soldier", a second season episode of Burn Notice
- "The Good Soldier", an episode of The Musketeers

== Music ==
- "The Good Soldier", a song by Nine Inch Nails from Year Zero
- "Good Soldier", a song by Flobots from Survival Story

== Other ==
- The Good Soldiers, a fictitious play in the 1994 Doctor Who New Adventures novel Theatre of War by Justin Richards

== See also ==
- The Good Soldier Švejk (disambiguation)
