= Communist Party USA and American labor movement (1937–1950) =

The Communist Party (CP) and its allies played a role in the United States labor movement, particularly in the 1930s and 1940s, but largely wasn't successful either in bringing the labor movement around to its agenda or in converting their influence in any particular union into membership gains for the Party. The CP has had only negligible influence in labor since its supporters' defeat in internal union political battles in the aftermath of World War II and the Congress of Industrial Organizations's (CIO) expulsion of unions in which the party held the most influence in 1950. The expelled parties were often raided by stronger unions, and most withered away.

== Historiography ==
Scholars disagree why the American union movement never formed a major labor party, and why American workers have never embraced socialist parties. German sociologist Werner Sombart emphasized the absence of socialism. Seymour Martin Lipset compared the US and Canada and asked why Canada had more success; Ira Katznelson looked at weaknesses in the working class, and Kim Voss emphasized early union formations. Others argue that a strain of American exceptionalism made US workers resistant to parties that emphasized class struggle. Some say that Americans downplayed political and social agendas for the sake of unity, so that short-term gains and building strong unions came at the cost of a potential labor party. Others say the left lost its power to lead the labor movement by what commenters charged were 'ideological zig-zags'. The Communist role within the labor movement support parts of all of these theses.

== Factionalism, zig zags and retreats ==
After playing a leading role in the United Automobile Workers's (UAW) victories in Flint against General Motors and Chrysler in 1937, the Communist Party found itself under sharp attack from its opponents within the UAW. Homer Martin, first president of the UAW, sought to drive out all of the left activists within the UAW in order to eliminate any rival contenders for power. Martin brought in Jay Lovestone, former executive secretary of the CP before his expulsion in 1929, as his advisor and installed Lovestone supporters in key positions throughout the union.

Martin only succeeded, however, in bringing about his own downfall. After he failed to persuade the UAW Convention in 1937 to give him authority to fire organizers and eliminate local union newspapers, Martin set out to expel his rivals. After firing or transferring a number of CP members who had played prominent roles in the Flint sit-down strike, Martin first suspended, then expelled, Mortimer and his other opponents on the UAW's Executive Board. The CIO leadership, alarmed by the possibility that sectarian infighting might destroy the UAW, forced Martin to reinstate the Executive Board members. When the reconstituted Executive Board ordered Martin to sever his ties with Lovestone and to submit all his public announcements to it for its approval, he attempted to suspend the majority of the Board, including both his opponents associated with the CP, such as Mortimer, their allies, such as Richard Frankensteen, and the UAW leaders associated with the Socialist Party, such as Walter Reuther. That nearly split the UAW. After skirmishes at the UAW headquarters and some local unions, the expelled Executive Board members, with the support of the CIO, regained control in 1939 and expelled Martin. He left with about 20,000 members to form his own union, which affiliated with the American Federation of Labor (AFL). Lovestone left with him.

The CP was in a particularly strong position at that point: it was the leading player in the Left-Center coalition that had defeated Martin and would have been able to elect George Addes, a close ally of the Party, as President of the UAW if it had pressed the point. But that would have required that the Party defy Sidney Hillman, head of the Amalgamated Clothing Workers of America and the most powerful force within the CIO after Lewis, and Philip Murray, Lewis' protégé and head of the Steel Workers Organizing Committee, who came to the convention to demand the selection of R.J. Thomas, an apolitical Board member who had, until recently, supported Martin, as its candidate to end the factional fighting within the UAW.

According to some reports, when Hillman and Murray could not bring Mortimer and his supporters around, Earl Browder, Chairman of the Communist Party of the USA (CPUSA), came to Cleveland to demand that they support Thomas. Eager not to appear as sectarians and thus endanger their role within the CIO at large, the CP leadership had the Communists within the UAW support Thomas and also permit the elimination of the Vice-President positions that they had held. At the same time, the CP began dissolving its factions within the UAW and dropping its shop papers as it aligned itself even more closely with the New Deal. In the name of labor unity, the CP undertook a tactical retreat.

The CP's conciliatory stance did not, however, protect it from its other factional rivals within the UAW. The working alliance between the CP and the Socialists in the UAW had broken down in 1938 over differences over the CP's support for "collective security", an alliance of the Soviet Union with the non-fascist nations of the West against Hitler. The Socialist Party, at that time even further left than the CP on many issues, organized a separate caucus within the Executive Board that, from that point forward, opposed the CP and its alliance partners.

=== Break with the Roosevelt administration ===
The CP made it easier for its opponents by making a number of sudden and shocking changes in policy. After the Hitler-Stalin pact, the CP campaigned vigorously against any US involvement in the war against fascism; a journalist with the CP's Weekly Worker newspaper coined the slogan "The Yanks Ain't Coming" to sum up the Party's position. What is more, the CP now repudiated its Popular Front strategies of the previous four years, attacking President Franklin Delano Roosevelt's administration's efforts to support France and Britain against Germany as a campaign to lead the US into an imperialist war. The federal government responded by arresting Earl Browder and a number of other CP leaders.

The CP's opponents within the labor movement capitalized on the Party's break with FDR to attack it. James Carey, the president of the United Electrical, Radio and Machine Workers of America (or UE) who had worked closely with Communist UE officials in the past, now distanced himself from them over their opposition to a third term for Roosevelt. The UAW passed several resolutions condemning both Nazis and Communists at its Conventions.

At the same time that their break with Roosevelt isolated them within the CIO, opponents of the CP outside the labor movement stepped up their attacks on the loyalty of Party members, accusing them, among other things, of engaging in sabotage by supporting strikes of aircraft workers during the UAW's organizing drive in that industry. While some of these accusations, such as those made by the Dies Committee or Reader's Digest, were so wide of the mark as to discredit the accusers, the tide of unfavorable publicity made any association with the CP that much riskier.

The CP also lost ground within the CIO. While the CP believed it could shelter itself within the CIO by continuing to loyally support Lewis, who also opposed a third term for Roosevelt, that reliance on Lewis was misplaced. Lewis was prepared both to use the CP and to get rid of CP members when they no longer served his purposes, as demonstrated by the activities of his lieutenant, Adolph Germer, who actively undercut the CP leadership within the International Woodworkers of America when sent to assist it in organizing lumber workers in the Northwest in 1940. At the same time Lewis abolished the position of west coast director of the CIO, which Harry Bridges had held, limiting his authority to California.

Whatever protection the CP could have hoped to receive from Lewis evaporated in any event in 1940, when Lewis abruptly resigned from his position as President of the CIO following his baffling decision to support Wendell Willkie over Roosevelt for President that year. Philip Murray, Lewis' successor as head of the CIO, was determined to stop the spread of the CP's influence in the CIO and to demonstrate to the public at large that the CIO was not controlled by the CP. To that end he insisted on a resolution at the CIO's 1940 conference that condemned Communism, along with Nazism and fascism, as "inimical to the welfare of labor." Lee Pressman, the most highly placed CP ally within the CIO, presented the resolution in his role as secretary of the resolutions committee.

Murray did not, however, insist on banning Communists from the CIO; on the contrary, he had no desire to provoke a public fight over the CP's politics or CP members' role within either the CIO or its affiliates. This suited the Party, which likewise did not want to risk a showdown that could possibly result in either their expulsion or split the CIO. So while internal political disputes kept the battles raging within unions such as the UAW, the UE and the IWA, the CP agreed to a compromise that forced them to accept the label of "totalitarian," but allowed them to maintain their positions within the CIO itself.

Communist influence in labor unions was seen by the Roosevelt administration as a serious threat to US military preparedness. As the US military built up in 1940 and 1941, US Secretary of War Henry Stimson was convinced that labor strikes and slowdowns at key facilities were due to the CPUSA's efforts to block Franklin Roosevelt's military preparedness policy. Strikes at Harville Die-Casting Company, Alcoa, and North American Aviation were widely seen within the Roosevelt administration as communist-inspired for ideological reasons, rather than for better wages and working conditions. The most important strike seen as communist-inspired was at the North American Aviation aircraft plant in Los Angeles on 5 June 1941. The plant built bombers for the U. S. and British governments, and the strike was seen as a serious threat to American aid to the Allies. The federal government seized the plant and army troops forced open paths through the picket lines to allow workers to enter the plant.

== World War II and the no-strike pledge ==
The CP's policy toward President Franklin Delano Roosevelt and war changed as soon as Hitler invaded the Soviet Union. At that point, the CP changed into unqualified supporters for the war effort. For their labor allies, that meant not only unconditional support for a wartime no-strike pledge - which the rest of the labor movement had endorsed to some degree - but also opposition to anything that would compromise anti-fascist unity at home. The CP's opponents within the labor movement would also use CP's sudden change against them in the factional battles of the years to come.

The change in CP policy led to some startlingly inconsistent positions on its part. When A. Philip Randolph, President of the Brotherhood of Sleeping Car Porters and the foremost African-American unionist of the time, urged a march on Washington in 1941 to underscore black workers' demands for the elimination of job discrimination in war industries, the CP attacked him relentlessly. This is more than ironic: the CP had championed black workers' rights in the past, even when it complicated their efforts to organize textile workers or miners in the South.

The Party had, however, strong political differences with Randolph, even before it became a supporter of the war: he had resigned as head of the National Negro Congress and denounced the CP when the CP broke with the Roosevelt Administration. When Hitler attacked the Soviet Union it continued to attack Randolph's proposed March, but now on the ground that it undermined the unity needed to win the war. The CP did not, on the other hand, abandon its support for civil rights, supporting the creation of the Fair Employment Practices Committee and fighting for equal treatment of black workers in the unions in which they had a presence. These battles were particularly fierce within the UAW, many of whose white members had engaged in hate strikes to protest either the hiring or promotion of black workers in their plants and who had engaged in the massive race riots in Detroit in 1943.

That battle inevitably became part of the larger battle between the Addes and Frankensteen group within the UAW, which the CP supported, and the Walter Reuther-led opposition. While each faction supported creation of a 'minority department' within the UAW to deal with the special needs of black and other minority workers and the education of UAW members generally, they disagreed over whether the head of that department should always be African-American. In the end, the 1943 UAW Convention defeated both sides' proposals on a voice vote after a heated debate in which many delegates opposed taking any stand on civil rights as being outside the union's economic sphere.

The CP was more vocal and consistent in supporting the wartime no-strike pledge - a position that ultimately cost it much support within the labor movement. The CIO and the AFL each supported the pledge in general, particularly after the furor strikes in the aircraft industry and at Allis-Chalmers Company had provoked in the years immediately before the United States' entry into the war. But the CP and its allies now embraced the pledge with such fervor, at the expense of traditional union principles some said, that it made the Party's commitment to unionism suspect. Harry Bridges of the International Longshore Workers Union (ILWU) called for a speedup of the pace of work - which may not have been inconsistent with the union's goal of controlling the way that work was done on the docks - but certainly sounded strange coming from the union that had previous relentlessly fought employers on the issue. Bridges, Joseph Curran of the NMU and Julius Emspak of the UE even supported a proposal by Roosevelt in 1944 to militarize some civilian workplaces, but retreated when the rest of the CIO executive board reacted furiously against it.

The CP also supported piecework systems in the electrical and automobile industries, which it defended as both necessary to boost production and a way to improve workers' earnings under the wartime wage control systems imposed by the War Labor Board, but which were still anathema, particularly to unionists in mass production industries such as automobile manufacturing. Walter Reuther used this issue to great effect against the CP and its allies at the UAW's 1943 Convention, where his slate fell just short of defeating Addes and Frankensteen.

On the other hand, the CP mended fences with Sidney Hillman and others within the CIO leadership by coming out strongly in support of Roosevelt for the duration of the war and working diligently in the CIO's political efforts. The Party also grew tremendously during the war years and even took the step, in the wake of the formal alliance between the United States and the Soviet Union, to formally dissolve itself, or at least rename itself as the Communist Political Association in 1944.

That attempt to submerge itself in the broader coalition to support Roosevelt and the Soviet Union probably did more to damage the Party's standing with many of its most reliable supporters than to make it look safe or respectable to people outside the Party. The Comintern changed direction a year later, when it ejected Browder from the Party, reestablished the CPUSA and installed Foster as its Chairman.

== The post-war era and expulsion from the CIO ==
The CP suffered a series of setbacks in the immediate postwar era. The most serious was their complete rout in the UAW, where Walter Reuther's slate finally triumphed in 1947 after years of inconclusive struggles with the Addes and Frankensteen faction. Reuther subsequently drove all of his principal CP adversaries out of the UAW, using one of the provisions of the newly enacted Taft–Hartley Act to complete the process.

In 1946 the Republican Party took control of both the House and Senate. That Congress passed the Taft–Hartley Act, which, among other things, required all union officers to sign an affidavit that they were not Communists in order for the union to bring a case before the NLRB. Reuther had three of the CP-leaning leaders of UAW Local 248 in Milwaukee—one of the CP's bastions and including some of Reuther's bitterest enemies—expelled for their refusal to sign the oath.

The CIO itself was slower to join the purge. Persons associated with the CP did, in fact, exercise a good deal of influence in a number of CIO unions in the 1940s, both in the leadership of unions such as the ILWU, UE, Transport Workers Union of America and Fur and Leather Workers and in staff positions in a number of other unions. Those persons had an uneasy relationship with Murray while he headed the CIO. He mistrusted the radicalism of some of their positions and was innately far more sympathetic to anti-Communist organizations such as the Association of Catholic Trade Unionists. He also believed, however, that making anti-communism a crusade would only strengthen labor's enemies and the rival AFL at a time when labor unity was most important.

Murray might have let the status quo continue, even while Reuther and others within the CIO attacked Communists in their unions, if the CPUSA had not chosen to back Henry A. Wallace's third party campaign for President in 1948. That, and an increasingly bitter division over whether the CIO should support the Marshall Plan, brought Murray to the conclusion that peaceful co-existence with Communists within the CIO was impossible.

Murray began by removing Bridges from his position as the California Regional Director for the CIO and letting go first Len De Caux in late 1947 and Lee Pressman in early 1948. Anti-communist unionists then took the battle to the City and State Councils, where they attempted to oust Communist leaders who did not support the CIO's position on the Marshall Plan and Wallace. A number of former allies or members of the Party, including Mike Quill of the Transport Workers and Joseph Curran of the National Maritime Union, severed their ties with the CP and fired the CP members on their staffs during this time.

After the 1948 election, the CIO took the fight one step further in 1950, expelling the ILWU, the Mine, Mill & Smelter Workers Union, the Farm Equipment Union, the Food and Tobacco Workers, and the Fur and Leather Workers, while creating a new union, the International Union of Electrical Workers, to replace the UE, which left the CIO rather than purge its leadership. The CP, which once held positions of influence at every level within the CIO and many of its affiliates, was now driven out of the CIO.

== The years since ==
The CP has, for all effects and purposes, no presence in or influence on the American union movement. Some of the expelled unions, such as the ILWU and UE, survived outside the AFL-CIO, maintaining their political principles, in particular solidarity with labor's struggles around the world and greater rank-and-file control of the union, but have no political relationship with the CP and only marginal influence within the labor movement as a whole. The ILWU has since reaffiliated with the AFL-CIO. Others, such as Mine, Mill, survived; it later merged with its ideological opponent, the Steelworkers, just as the Farm Equipment union eventually was absorbed by the UAW with the latter adding "Farm Implement Workers" to their long official name. Others, such as the Food and Tobacco Workers, disappeared.

To the extent that the CP has had any residual effect on the American union movement, after helping to organize some industrial unions, its only legacy has been its opposition to racial discrimination and its commitment to organizing the lowest-paid workers. "Old left" unionists played an important role in organizing hospital workers into District 1199 in New York in the 1950s and 1960s; CP veterans also contributed to the organizing successes of the United Farm Workers. But by the 1950s and 1960s, present and former members of the CPUSA did not advertise their membership or try to use organizing victories to recruit new members. The Party by that time was too weak, membership having declined fairly continuously since early in the Eisenhower (and McCarthy) era.

== See also ==
- Communists in the United States labor movement (1919–1937)
- Wildcat strike action
