= John Cort =

John Cort may refer to:

- John C. Cort (1913–2006), a Christian socialist writer and activist
- John E. Cort (born 1953), a Professor of Religion and Indologist
- John Cort (impresario), an early 20th-century American financier of concerts, plays, and operas
