= Albert Fitzgerald =

American trade unionist

Albert J. Fitzgerald
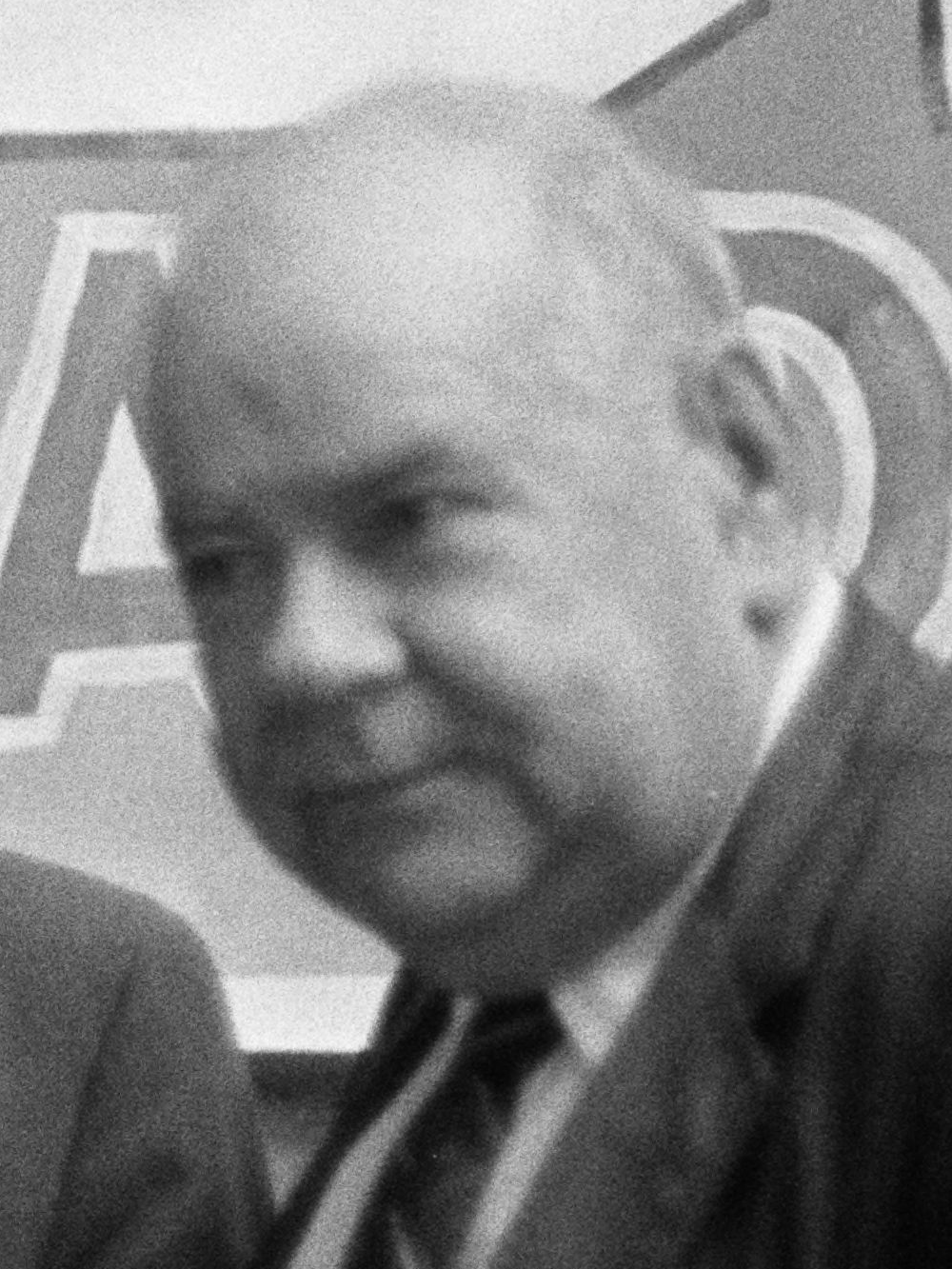
- Fitzgerald in 1972
- Born: September 21, 1906; Newburyport, Massachusetts
- Died: May 1, 1982 (aged 75); Boston, Massachusetts
- Occupation: Trade Unionist
- Known for: President of the United Electrical, Radio and Machine Workers of America (UE) (1941-78)

Albert Joseph Fitzgerald (September 21, 1906 - May 1, 1982) was an American trade unionist from Lynn, Massachusetts.

== Life and career ==
The son of Michael Fitzgerald and his wife Maria Kirby, Albert Joseph Fitzgerald was born Fitzgerald was born on September 21, 1906 in Newburyport, Massachusetts. He was educated in schools in his native to town.

A leader in the United Electrical, Radio and Machine Workers of America (UE) and Congress of Industrial Organizations (CIO). He was President of UE starting in 1941 after defeating James B. Carey until his retirement in 1978. During his time as UE President, the organization was expelled from the CIO for alleged communist domination. The union continued organizing as an independent union thereafter and survived raiding and rebuke from other unions.

Fitzgerald died at University Hospital, Boston (merged into Boston Medical Center in 1996) on May 1, 1982 at the age of 75.

Trade union offices
Preceded by James B. Carey	President of the United Electrical, Radio and Machine Workers of America (UE); 1941-1978	Succeeded by Dennis Glavin
