= William H. Bywater =

William Harold Bywater II (September 10, 1920 – October 25, 2018) was an American labor union leader.

== Biography ==
William Harold Bywater II was born in Trenton, New Jersey, and grew up in New York City. He began working at the Ford Instrument Company plant in Long Island, and joined the United Electrical, Radio and Machine Workers of America. In 1940, he was elected as a shop steward, and soon rose to become president of his local union, during which time it left the international union and joined the new International Union of Electrical Workers.

Within the new union, Bywater was appointed as conference board chair for Sperry Rand, serving for 10 years. By the end of the period, he was also the union's secretary for district 3. In 1961, he was elected to the union's executive board, and in 1968 he was elected as president of district 3. In this role, he improved the district's finances, launched a housing program, and increased social and educational activities.

In 1976, Bywater stood unsuccessfully to become international president of the union. Two years later, he won election as the union's secretary-treasurer, in which role he focused on organization and staff training. He was appointed as president of the union in 1982. As leader of the union, he became known for his opposition to free trade, and the North American Free Trade Agreement in particular. He retired in 1996.

Bywater died in New York on October 25, 2018, at the age of 98.

Trade union offices
| Preceded by George Hutchins | Secretary-Treasurer of the International Union of Electrical Workers; 1978–1982 | Succeeded by Ed Fire |
| Preceded by David J. Fitzmaurice | President of the International Union of Electrical Workers; 1982–1996 | Succeeded by Ed Fire |
