= The Good Soldier Švejk (disambiguation) =

The Good Soldier Švejk (Czech: Dobrý voják Švejk; the Germanised spelling Schweik is also used in English and other languages) is a common abbreviation of the title of the 1920s WW1 novel by Jaroslav Hašek as wall as an epithet of its eponymous anti-hero, Private Josef Švejk.

The Good Soldier Schweik may also refer to the following adaptations:

- The Good Soldier Schweik (1926 film), a silent film by Karel Lamač
- The Good Soldier Schweik (1931 film), a sound film by Martin Frič
- The Good Soldier Schweik (1955 film), an animated colour film by Jiří Trnka
- The Good Soldier Schweik (1956 film), a live-action colour film, first of two based on the novel
- The Good Soldier Schweik (1960 film), a German film
- The Good Soldier Schweik, an instrumental suite by Robert Kurka (1956–1958, expanded into a 1957 opera)
- The Good Soldier Schweik (opera), an opera by Robert Kurka

== See also ==
- The Good Soldier (disambiguation)
