= Ed Fire =

Edward L. Fire (born 1937) is a former American labor union leader.

Born in Lowellville, Ohio, Fire was an all-county football player while at high school. He served in the United States Navy for three years, then attended Youngstown State University. He began working at General Motors' Packard Electric plant in Warren, Ohio. He joined the International Union of Electrical Workers (IUE), and was elected as president of his local union in 1964.

In 1974, Fire was elected as secretary-treasurer of the union's district 7, and also to the union's executive board in 1975. In 1977, he won election as president of his conference board, in which role he led contract negotiations with General Motors. He became president of district 7 in 1980, and then in 1982 was appointed as secretary-treasurer of the international union.

Fire was elected as president of the union in 1996, and also as a vice-president of the AFL-CIO. As leader of his union, he negotiated a merger with the Communications Workers of America, which was completed in 2000. He continued as president of the union's new IUE division until his retirement in 2004.

Trade union offices
Preceded by William H. Bywater	Secretary-Treasurer of the International Union of Electrical Workers; 1982–1996	Succeeded by Ron Gilvin
Preceded by William H. Bywater	President of the International Union of Electrical Workers; 1996–2000	Succeeded by Union merged
Preceded by Division created	President of the IUE-CWA; 2000–2003	Succeeded by Mike Bindas
