= United Electrical, Radio and Machine Workers of America =

U.S. trade union

- Abbreviation: UE
- Formation: 1936
- Type: Trade union
- Headquarters: Pittsburgh, Pennsylvania, US
- Location: United States
- Members: 25,050 (2025)
- President: Scott Slawson
- Affiliations: IndustriALL Global Union
- Website: ueunion.org

The United Electrical, Radio and Machine Workers of America (UE) is a labor union representing workers in both the private and public sectors across the United States.

Several authors regard UE as one of the more democratic and politically progressive national unions in the United States. UE emphasizes its principles of democratic unionism with its longstanding slogan, "The members run this union."

As of 2019, UE membership was reported at 35,000. UE organizes private and public sector workers. Its practices attracted several small independent unions to affiliate. Since 1992, the union has built an alliance with the Authentic Labor Front, an independent Mexican union, and UE is active in international labor outreach.

== History ==
=== Early history ===
UE was one of the first unions to be chartered by the Congress of Industrial Organizations (CIO) and grew to over 600,000 members in the 1940s. UE was founded in March 1936 by several independent industrial unions which had been organized in the earlier part of the 1930s by workers in major plants of the General Electric Company, Westinghouse Electric, RCA, and other leading electrical equipment and radio manufacturers.

In 1937 a group of local unions in the machine shop industry, led by James J. Matles, left the International Association of Machinists (IAM), objecting to that union's policies of racial discrimination, and joined the young UE. UE withdrew from affiliation with CIO in 1949 over differences related to the developing Cold War, during the early stages of which a former official of the Polish Communist Party referred to the UE as one of the basic sources of anti-American propaganda for the Soviet bloc. It suffered significant losses of membership through the 1950s to raids by other unions, in particular the International Union of Electrical Workers (IUE) which was set up by the CIO in 1949 with the goal of replacing UE. The UE and IUE were rivals for many years, but in the 1960s began to cooperate in bargaining with General Electric and other employers.

The CIO granted UE the first charter on November 16, 1938. UE was founded at a March 1936 meeting of existing local unions in plants of the electrical equipment and radio industries, a few months the founding of the CIO. In September 1936 the AFL suspended its member unions that had started the CIO – originally called the Committee on Industrial Organization and formed by existing industrial unions within the AFL as a caucus to promote organizing industrial unions in mass production industries. The AFL, dominated by craft unions, soon escalated the conflict by expelling the CIO unions, prominent among which were John L. Lewis of the United Mine Workers (UMW) and Sidney Hillman, president of the Amalgamated Clothing Workers of America (ACWA). Over the next few years a wave of strikes and mass organizing by industrial workers rapidly built the membership of the CIO and of newly formed industrial unions such as UE, the United Auto Workers (UAW), United Rubber Workers, and United Steelworkers (USW).

The union won a contentious strike at RCA and organized additional plants of GE, Westinghouse, GM's electrical division and smaller companies in its base industries. The union signed its first national contract with GE in 1938; Westinghouse, which more stubbornly resisted unionization of its plants, did not sign an agreement until 1941. By the end of World War II, UE was the third largest CIO union, with a membership of over 600,000.

As in many of the new CIO unions organized in the 1930s, the membership and leaders of UE included a variety of radicals, including socialists and communists, as well as New Deal liberals and Catholics. Among the organizers and leaders of UE Local 107 at the Westinghouse South Philadelphia works were several former members of the Industrial Workers of the World (IWW). Foes of UE in the 1940s, 1950s and 1960s charged the union with "communist domination"; later studies demonstrated that UE was one of the most democratic US labor unions and that its policies differed markedly from those of the US Communist Party on a number of major issues.

Following the outbreak of World War II, UE joined with other unions in the CIO in urging a no-strike pledge and higher productivity for the duration of the war, which UE viewed as a struggle against world fascism and therefore worthy of labor's support. The UE also supported expanded use of piecework systems in industry, which it defended as both necessary to boost production and a way to improve workers' earnings under the wartime wage control systems imposed by the War Labor Board.

UE continued to bargain aggressively for its members during the war, winning numerous improvements in contract language and benefits. Despite the War Labor Board's policy of freezing wages for the duration of the war, UE leaders devised strategies to win WLB approval of pay increases for many of their members. Despite the union's support for the no-strike pledge, UE leaders supported militant actions by their members, such as a strike by UE members at a Babcock & Wilcox plant in New Jersey, resulting in UE claiming over 200 locals at the peak of war production in 1944.

In late 1945, the three largest unions of the CIO engaged in a national strike to regain economic ground lost by workers during the war, when wages had been frozen but industrial profits had risen significantly. The United Auto Workers shut down the auto plants of General Motors; UE struck GE, Westinghouse, and the GM electrical division, and the United Steelworkers stopped work in the basic steel industry. The 1946 strikes were successful, but the outcome stiffened the resolve of industrialists to break the power of the CIO through a strategy of divide-and-conquer. The brewing Cold War would provide the opportunity, and in October 1946 GE's Charles Wilson declared that the problems of the United States could be summed up as "Russia abroad, labor at home."

Republican victories in the elections of 1946 had brought a much more conservative Congress to Washington, with a determination to curb labor. The Taft-Hartley Act, drafted in large part by lobbyists for the National Association of Manufacturers, General Electric, Inland Steel and other industrialists, represented a major revision of the Wagner Act that significantly weakened labor's ability to organize and effectively negotiate.

Among its many anti-union provisions was a clause requiring officers of all unions to sign "non-communist affidavits," swearing that they were not members of the Communist Party. Leaders of virtually all CIO and AFL unions denounced this new law, and in particular called the affidavit clause an intolerable government interference in internal union matters and an encroachment on freedom of speech and association. Union leaders vowed to boycott the Taft-Hartley labor board and agreed in principle that all would refuse to sign the affidavits, but few followed through.

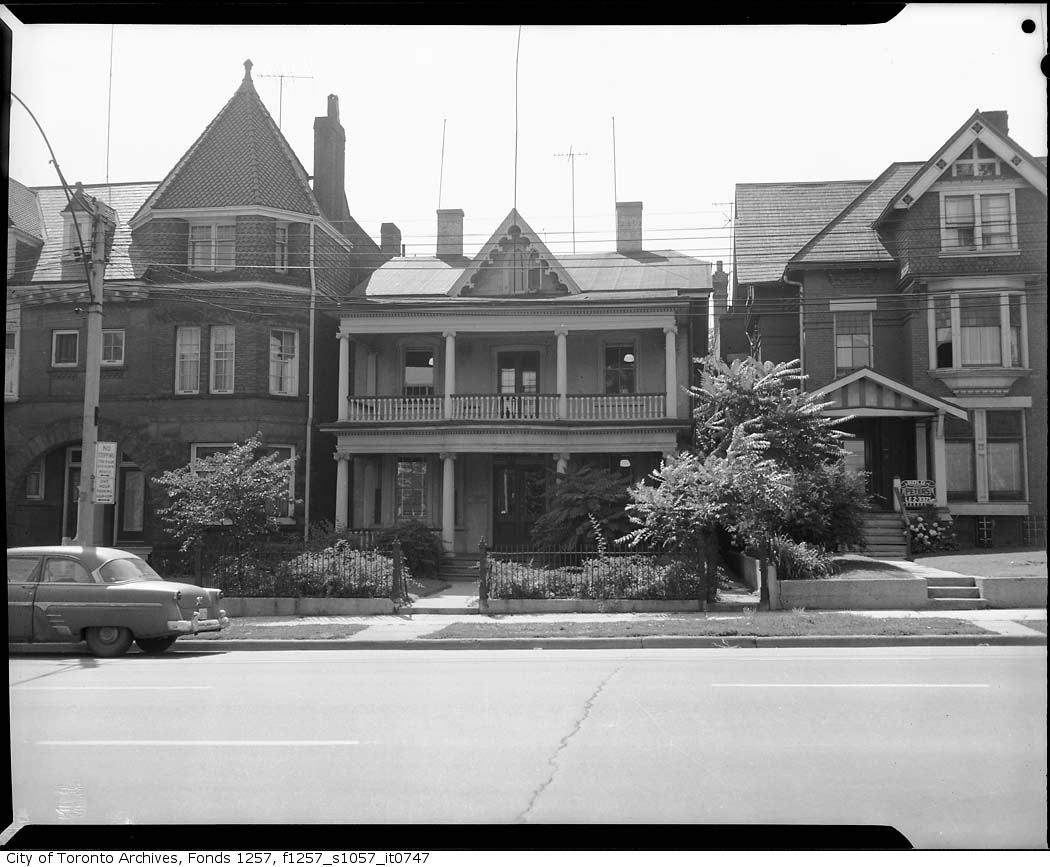
United Electrical Radio and Machine Workers of America office, 292 Jarvis Street 1965

Some union leaders, including Walter Reuther of the UAW, signed the Taft-Hartley affidavits and then proceeded to raid locals of UE and the Farm Equipment Workers (FE), whose leaders were still holding out and refusing to sign. This meant that UAW would appear on the NLRB ballot, but the incumbent UE or FE could not.

The CIO, under President Philip Murray, did nothing to discourage the United Auto Workers from poaching on UE shops in the arms and typewriter industries in the Connecticut River Valley; other unions affiliated with the AFL, such as the International Brotherhood of Electrical Workers, likewise displaced the UE in some plants.

Fissures within UE that appeared around the 1941 convention (when James Carey had been defeated as UE president by Albert J. Fitzgerald, a GE worker from Lynn, Massachusetts) reopened in the late-1940s anti-communist political environment. Up-and-coming Republican politicians, such as Congressman Richard Nixon of California and Senator Joseph McCarthy of Wisconsin (who, according to Journalist Arnold Beichman, "was elected to his first term in the Senate with support from" UE, which preferred McCarthy to the anti-communist Robert M. La Follette), built their careers by targeting "Communist subversion" within the federal government and by red-baiting their election opponents such as the CIO. CIO leaders such as Philip Murray of the Steelworkers and Walter Reuther of the UAW responded to these attacks by purging their own unions of communists and by attacking CIO unions such as UE that were viewed as communist dominated. Investigations by the House Un-American Activities Committee and criticism from groups such as the Association of Catholic Trade Unionists, which actively organized dissenters within UE into an opposition faction, put UE leaders on the defensive.

Anti-communist raids by other unions removed some conservative members and locals from UE, thereby weakening the right-wing internal opposition. Nonetheless, oppositionists were confident that the national political atmosphere would enable them to seize power in UE at the union's 1949 convention, but the right-wing candidates were defeated. UE's convention delegates instead backed their national officers' demands that the CIO stop the UAW and other CIO unions from raiding UE.

To defend the union from future raids, UE reversed its refusal to sign Taft-Hartley affidavits, enabling the union to again appear on the ballot in NLRB representation elections. When the CIO refused to take action to stop CIO-affiliated unions from raiding other CIO unions, UE boycotted the CIO's national convention in 1949 and withheld its per capita dues payments, effectively resigning its affiliation to the CIO. The CIO responded by announcing the expulsion of UE as well as that of the United Farm Equipment Workers (FE); the following year the CIO expelled nine other unions believed to be communist dominated.

Of the 11 "left wing" unions that were expelled or resigned from the CIO in 1949–50, only UE and the International Longshore and Warehouse Union remain in existence as of 2020. All of the others were broken by targeting from employers, the government and other unions through the period of McCarthyism.

The CIO chartered a rival union, the International Union of Electrical, Radio and Machine Workers (IUE), that would attempt to destroy and replace UE. James Carey, the founding president of UE, was appointed president of the IUE. The IUE won many of the locals in the radio assembly and light manufacturing industries; the UE held on to much of its base in machine building. In the heavy electrical equipment plants, both had substantial strength. In Local 601, which represented Westinghouse workers in East Pittsburgh, Pennsylvania and whose members had a tradition of radical politics dating back to Eugene V. Debs' candidacy for president in 1912, the two factions were led by brothers Mike and Tom Fitzpatrick, who attacked each other personally as vigorously as the factions did on political issues. The IUE won a close election, with the semi-skilled workers supporting the IUE while more skilled workers favored the UE.

Employers, the federal government, the news media and other establishment forces played major roles in the efforts to eliminate UE. UE was subjected to a barrage of inquisitions by Congressional committees, such as the House Un-American Activities Committee (HUAC), Sen. Joseph McCarthy's Subcommittee on Investigations, and a similar committee chaired by Sen. John Marshall Butler. In several instances, these committees used subpoena power to set up UE members to be fired by their employers, unless the subpoenaed worker cooperated by "naming names" and thereby subjecting other workers to the inquisition.

GE fired John Nelson, president of UE's large Local 506 in Erie, Pennsylvania, on just such grounds. The stress resulting from his own firing and the unrelenting persecution of his union destroyed Nelson's health; he died in 1959 at the age of 42. McCarthy's investigations were sometimes carefully scheduled to help the IUE and the companies against UE. In 1953 he held a hearing in Lynn, Massachusetts on the eve of an NLRB election between UE and IUE at the major GE plant there. His investigation of UE members, in the guise of investigating "Communist subversion," made for sensationalist news headlines and helped the IUE narrowly win.

Several UE shop leaders, as well as UE Secretary-Treasurer Julius Emspak, were put on trial on contempt charges for refusing to cooperate with HUAC. The federal government tried unsuccessfully to take away James Matles's citizenship and deport him; the UE national organizing director had immigrated from Romania as a youth. UE was subject to similar prosecutions, harassment by the FBI, attacks in local newspapers, and denunciation by politicians.

The red-baiting attacks on UE during the McCarthy era did tremendous damage to the union, but were eventually shown to have no legal merit. Most of the legal cases against UE leaders were eventually withdrawn or defeated in the courts, and in March 1959 the US Justice Department was forced to drop its prosecution of UE on charges that the union was "Communist-dominated."

UE loyalists counteracted the IUE by highlighting its relative weakness in standing up to management, and derisively characterized the acronym IUE as standing for "Imitation UE."

While the UE and the IUE won roughly equal number of elections through the first half of the 1950s, the IUE came away with larger numbers of members, particularly in the growing field of consumer electronics. Other unions, including the IBEW, the IAM, the UAW, the United Steel Workers of America, the International Brotherhood of Teamsters and the Sheet Metal Workers International Association, also wedged in during these elections. The IUE, moreover, found itself divided, as the divergent groups that had allied to oppose the UE now found it hard to work with each other once in power.

In 1965, James Carey was defeated for the presidency of IUE by one of his own lieutenants.

During World War II and continuing through the Cold War, UE took a more progressive position on women's rights than other unions, advocating "equal pay for equal work" during the war in successful suits against GE and Westinghouse before the War Labor Board and, after the war, resisting employers' attempts to drive married women out of industry and to deny seniority and maternity leave to women workers. The 1946 strike at GE was prolonged by the company's insistence on giving a smaller wage increase to its women employees, whom GE president Charles E. Wilson contemptuously dismissed as "bobbysoxers." With all other strike issues resolved, UE held out until GE agreed that women would receive the same raises as men. In the early 1950s, UE organized a series of district and national conferences on the problems of women workers. Local union leaders who opposed UE's policies on gender equality often went to the IUE and took members with them.

UE also advocated for African American workers. In July 1950 UE leaders appointed Ernest Thompson, a black international representative and former rank-and-file factory worker, as secretary of the UE Fair Practices Committee. In essence the union's affirmative action officer, Thompson met with the leadership of UE locals around the country to develop and implement action plans to force employers to hire more black workers, and to give African Americans opportunities to advance into skilled trades jobs. In the midst of the Cold War assaults on UE, the union's newspaper reported such success stories as the promotion of a black worker at Johnson Machine to lathe operator. The company had insisted that this worker was unqualified and refused to train him, so white union members had taught him the job during their lunch breaks.

UE spoke out frequently against the racist government policies of the time, drawing attention to the injustices of "Jim Crow" racial segregation and denial of black voting rights. UE called for reinstating the federal Fair Employment Practices Committee, a wartime agency created by President Franklin D. Roosevelt to stop discrimination in industry, which was disbanded after the war by President Harry Truman. UE's progressive position was used against it by its foes; in several instances the IUE openly appealed for the votes of white workers on the basis of racial bigotry and by attacking UE's support for racial equality.

By 1954, UE officers reported that 87 percent of all UE contracts contained no-discrimination clauses, which placed UE far ahead of other unions.

A second wave of defections in the mid-1950s took several important UE locals, which had survived earlier raiding, into the IUE and other unions. The UE's membership dropped from 200,000 in 1953 to 58,000 in 1960. Some of the losses resulted from companies, including GE and Westinghouse, moving portions of their manufacturing from older plants in the Northeast to new plants in the South and West.

The split of 1955-56 largely involved tactical disagreements over how to move the UE's progressive program and brand of unionism forward in the face of the AFL-CIO merger. It proved a disappointment to UE activists, who had managed to bring the union successfully through the hardest years of the McCarthy period and the Cold War. Most locals in the UE's New York-north Jersey district (UE District 4) voted to go into the IUE reasoning that they had the strength and experience to influence the policies of the newer union. While this move was resented by UE activists elsewhere, especially in Pennsylvania and the midwest, the District 4 activists felt that the UE forces could soon have regained control of the re-united organization had the whole union followed their lead. By the mid-1960s, the former UE activists in IUE shops played a role in helping to bring about James Carey's ouster in a disputed election. Carey's departure eventually opened the way for the co-ordinated bargaining which partially healed the two decade old division in the industry.

=== UE reshapes itself ===
The UE and IUE began to cooperate in bargaining after the IUE's disastrous 1960 strike against GE. In the successful 103-day national strike in 1969–70, UE and IUE led an alliance of unions which defeated GE's Boulwarism. Boulwarism was named for Lemuel Boulware, the company's vice president of labor and community relations, who devised the strategy in reaction to UE's success in the 1946 strike, and to capitalize on the divisions, after 1949, in the ranks of GE union members. The 1970s brought UE renewed growth through successful organizing. UE lost many members in the 1980s and 1990s as the flight of many manufacturing plants abroad led to plant closings by both major employers in the electrical manufacturing industry, as well as by smaller UE employers.

Despite shrinkage of GE's US manufacturing employment, UE remains a major force within General Electric today and plays a leading role in negotiating contracts that cover members of 13 unions in GE through the Coordinated Bargaining Committee. UE's role in the union coalition resulted in union gains in 2007 national negotiations with GE.

In 1985, UE elected field organizer Amy Newell as secretary-treasurer and she became the first woman to lead a primarily manufacturing union.

The UE has broadened its scope, organizing public employees, service industry workers, school and college employees, and others. The UE has also replaced some other unions in workplaces where the existing unions failed to adequately represent the membership.

The UE entered into a "strategic organizing alliance" with the Mexican Frente Auténtico del Trabajo (FAT, "Authentic Labor Front"), in which the UE and FAT collaborate in organizing and educational projects. UE's organizing alliance with the FAT started in 1992 and grew from the two organizations' shared opposition to the North American Free Trade Agreement (NAFTA). The UE has also formed alliances with non-labor groups, both in the US and internationally, through the World Social Forum, to fight the effects of corporate globalization promoted by institutions of global capital such as the International Monetary Fund and free trade agreements modeled on the North American Free Trade Agreement (NAFTA).

Beginning in the mid-1990s, UE has been organizing state and municipal workers in North Carolina, chartering their statewide organization as UE Local 150. A North Carolina state law dating to the Jim Crow era of racial segregation, General Statute 95–98, prohibits public employees from bargaining labor contracts. UE campaigned to repeal that act and replace it with legislation to facilitate public sector bargaining.

Membership (US records)
View source data.
Finances (US records; ×$1000)
View source data.

As part of that campaign, UE in December 2005 brought a complaint before the International Labour Organization, the UN's labor agency, charging that the North Carolina bargaining ban violates international agreements on labor rights, which uphold the right of nearly all workers to form unions and bargain collectively. In March 2007 the ILO ruled in favor of UE, and called upon the United States and North Carolina to repeal GS 95-98 and begin discussions with unions to establish "a framework for collective bargaining." UE's Mexican ally the FAT, with the support of 52 other US, Mexican, Canadian and global labor organizations, filed a complaint in October 2006 with the Mexican National Administrative Office – a body established to address complaints of labor rights violations under NAFTA. The complaint charges that the North Carolina bargaining ban violates the North American Agreement on Labor Cooperation (NAALC), the labor-rights side agreement to NAFTA. In November 2007 the Mexican NAO launched an investigation into those charges.

In September 2006, sanitation workers for the City of Raleigh conducted a two-day strike over unfair treatment and working conditions. Since the stoppage, those workers, organized by UE Local 150, have won improvements and regular consultation of city officials with their elected union leaders. UE has expanded its public sector organizing to two other states in the Upper South that also lack public employee bargaining rights, establishing UE Local 160 in Virginia and UE Local 170 in West Virginia.

UE has also become known throughout the US labor movement as the "National Home for Independent Unions", and works with many independent unions across the country. A number of existing independent unions have affiliated with UE, seeking the resources, support and solidarity of a national union and attracted by UE's democratic structure and practices.

In July 2005, the 2,500 member Connecticut Independent Labor Union (CILU) voted by an overwhelming margin to become UE Local 222. Since joining UE, Local 222's work has focused on bringing democracy, justice and equality to the workplace, and on organizing and mobilizing its members and local communities in fights for gender pay equity, ending all forms of discrimination, and health care for all. The local has also added members by organizing additional groups of school and municipal workers in Connecticut.

=== Republic plant occupation of 2008 ===
On December 5, 2008, members of UE Local 1110 at Republic Windows and Doors in Chicago, when the plant closed with only three days' notice to the employees, occupied the plant in protest of the closing and company's failure to pay employees their accrued vacation pay, and payments required under the federal Worker Adjustment and Retraining Notification Act. The WARN Act requires 60 days' notice of a plant closing, or 60 days pay if timely notice is not given. The workers' action drew extensive media coverage and attracted wide support, including from US President-elect Barack Obama, and Illinois Governor Rod Blagojevich banned state business with Bank of America, because the bank's cancellation of the company's line of credit had prompted the shutdown. Protest demonstrations at Bank of America branches took place in dozens of US cities during the sit-in. On December 10 the union members voted to end the occupation after Republic, Bank of America, JPMorgan Chase, and the union negotiated a settlement that paid each worker eight weeks wages, plus all accumulated vacation pay, and health insurance for two months.

Two months later a California window manufacturer, Serious Materials, purchased the former Republic plant and reopened it, reinstating the union workers to their jobs in order of seniority and signing a labor contract with UE Local 1110 that was substantially the same as the union's former contract with Republic. In April 2009 Vice President Joe Biden visited the plant and met with company officials and union leaders, praising the reopening of the plant as "a big deal".

In February 2012 Serious Materials management announced the plant's immediate closing. The news was unexpected and the union responded in the same way it had four years prior. Despite its drastic diminution – Serious Materials had called back 75 of the plant's 250 employees, with only 38 employed by the closing's announcement – workers successfully negotiated an agreement with management by that night. Assistance and publicity coincided with the Occupy movement in Chicago, members of which came to the plant. The union agreed to 90 days of employment before the plants closing.

On August 27, 2019, UE endorsed the 2020 presidential campaign of Bernie Sanders.

=== Emergency Workplace Organizing Committee ===
In 2020, UE and Democratic Socialists of America founded the Emergency Workplace Organizing Committee (EWOC) to "help workers organize" by developing training programs and connecting labor organizers with appropriate resources. Jacobin attributed various labor organizing drive and union election victories to the assistance of EWOC organizers, and has noted EWOC for supporting labor militancy.

== Financial practices ==
Since UE's founding, its constitution has limited the pay of its officers to "a salary not to exceed the highest weekly wage paid in the industry." Linked to the pay rates of production workers at GE, the annual salaries of UE's three national officers are currently $62,072 – a fraction of what other unions pay their officers. The salaries of UE regional officers, staff, and those local officers who work for the union full-time, follow the same principle and are somewhat lower. UE is the only national union in the US that explicitly limits the pay of officers to a pay level of members As noted above, all increases in the pay of UE national officers and staff must be approved by delegates to the national convention as amendments to the union constitution, subsequently being ratified by membership vote at local union meetings.

== Presidents ==
1936: James B. Carey
1941: Albert Fitzgerald
1978: Dennis Glavin
1981: Jim Kane
1987: John Hovis
2019: Carl Rosen
2025: Scott Slawson

== See also ==
- Communists in the US Labor Movement (1919-1937)
- Communists in the US Labor Movement (1937-1950)
- Industrial Workers of the World
- Ruth Young (labor union official)
