= Paul Jennings (union worker) =

Paul J. Jennings (March 19, 1918 – September 7, 1987) was an American labor leader who served as president of the International Union of Electrical Workers (IUE) from 1965 to 1976.

== Life and career ==
Jennings was born in Brooklyn, New York. He attended James Madison High School, the RCA Institute and the Crown Heights Labor School.

He was the successor to founding president James B. Carey. Among his successes were formation of a 13-union committee created for collective bargaining with General Electric and Westinghouse. His attempts to stop Richard Nixon's re-election as president landed him on the master list of Nixon political opponents.

Jennings died in West Hempstead, New York following a long illness. The IUE's Paul Jennings Scholarship is named in his honor.

Trade union offices
Preceded by James B. Carey	President of the International Union of Electrical Workers; 1965–1976	Succeeded by David J. Fitzmaurice
Preceded by I. W. Abel; Teddy Gleason	AFL-CIO delegate to the Trades Union Congress; 1971; With: John F. Griner	Succeeded by Frederick O'Neal; Louis Stulberg
