= David J. Fitzmaurice =

American labor union leader

David Joseph Fitzmaurice (1913 – November 12, 1982) was an American labor union leader.

Born in Charleston, Pennsylvania, in the early 1940s, Fitzmaurice began working at General Electric in Cleveland, making light bulbs. He joined the International Union of Electrical Workers, and soon became a shop steward. In 1948, he organized an anti-communist slate in his local union; all the members were elected, with Fitzmaurice becoming president.

Fitzmaurice was elected as secretary-treasurer of the international union in 1968, and then in 1976 was appointed as president, winning an election later in the year, to hold the post on a permanent basis. As leader of the union, he focused on opposing increases in imports and unemployment, and tackling racial and sexual discrimination. He was also elected as a vice-president of the AFL-CIO.

Fitzmaurice contracted cancer, and died in 1982, while still in office.

Trade union offices
Preceded by George Collins	Secretary-Treasurer of the International Union of Electrical Workers; 1968–1976	Succeeded by George Hutchins
Preceded by Paul Jennings	President of the International Union of Electrical Workers; 1976–1982	Succeeded by William H. Bywater
