= Surface bargaining =

Bad faith collective bargaining strategy

In collective bargaining, surface bargaining is a strategy in which one of the parties "merely goes through the motions", with no intention of reaching an agreement. In this regard, it is a form of bad faith bargaining.

Distinguishing surface bargaining from good faith bargaining is extremely difficult. The entire history of the negotiations must be assessed, including the party's intent, efforts made toward reaching an agreement, and any behavior which may be seen as inhibiting the bargaining process. Surface bargaining tactics may include making proposals the other party could never accept, taking inflexible or unreasonable stands on issues or refusing to offer alternatives to proposals. Reneging on agreements already reached during the collective bargaining process, raising new issues late in the negotiations, or failing to follow generally accepted procedures for collective bargaining may also be seen as signs of surface bargaining.

Based upon the "totality" of a party's actions during collective bargaining, surface bargaining may be found if there was a purposeful effort to avoid or frustrate mutual agreement. Under US law, it is an unfair labor practice and a breach of the duty to bargain in good faith.

Surface bargaining is barred under the labour law of many countries. Federal and provincial Canadian labour law bars surface bargaining, and Canadian courts have held that the test for determining surface bargaining is to look at the totality of the negotiations. In New Zealand, surface bargaining is a violation of the Employment Relations Act 2000 (as amended). A "Code of Good Faith" promulgated by the Employment Relations Authority supplements the legal statute, however, and lays out a number of rules for good faith bargaining. In the United States, surface bargaining constitutes an unfair labor practice under the National Labor Relations Act. US courts have held that "hard bargaining" (taking a firmly held and well-explained position), failing to make a concession or failing to reach an agreement do not constitute surface bargaining under federal labor law. Additional evidence, such as away-from-the-table statements or behavior, is needed to prove surface bargaining in the US.

== See also ==
- Boulwarism
