= James B. Carey =

American labor unionist (1911–1973)

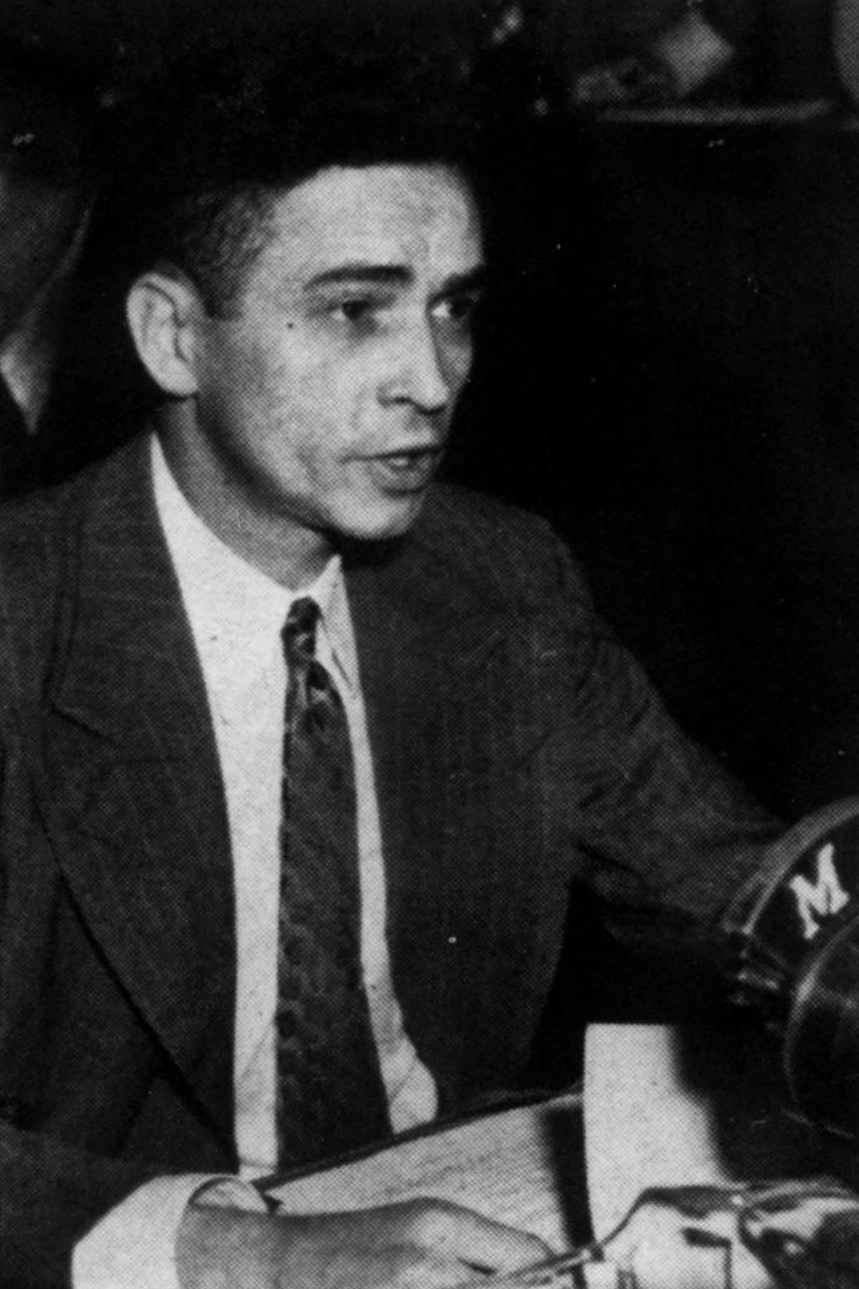
- Carey c. 1948
- Born: James Barron Carey; August 12, 1911; Philadelphia, Pennsylvania
- Died: September 11, 1973 (aged 62); Silver Spring, Maryland
- Citizenship: American
- Employer(s): AFL, RATNLC, UE, CIO, IUE, AFL-CIO

James Barron Carey (August 12, 1911 – September 11, 1973) was a 20th century American labor union leader, secretary-treasurer of the Congress of Industrial Organizations (CIO; 1938–1955), vice president of AFL–CIO (from 1955) and served as president of the United Electrical Workers (UE; 1936–1941), but broke from it because of its alleged Communist control. He was the founder and president of the rival International Union of Electrical, Radio and Machine Workers (1950–1965). President Truman appointed Carey to the President's Committee on Civil Rights in 1946. Carey was labor representative to the United Nations Association (1965–1972). He helped influence the CIO's pullout from the World Federation of Trade Unions (WFTU) and the formation of the International Confederation of Free Trade Unions (ICFTU) dedicated to promoting free trade and democratic unionism worldwide.

== Background ==
James Barron Carey, was born in Philadelphia, Pennsylvania on August 12, 1911 of Irish descent, one of the eleven children of John C. and Margaret (née Loughery) Carey. His father was a paymaster at the United States Mint in Philadelphia. Carey attended St. Theresa's Parochial School. The family moved to Glassboro, New Jersey where he graduated from Glassboro High School. At the age of fourteen he was making trellises in a local factory after school hours and during summers; while still in school he worked part-time as an apprentice projectionist in a Glassboro motion picture theater. The head projectionist, who was an officer in the film operators' union, reportedly gave Carey the theory and practice of the labor movement.

== Career ==
=== Union career ===
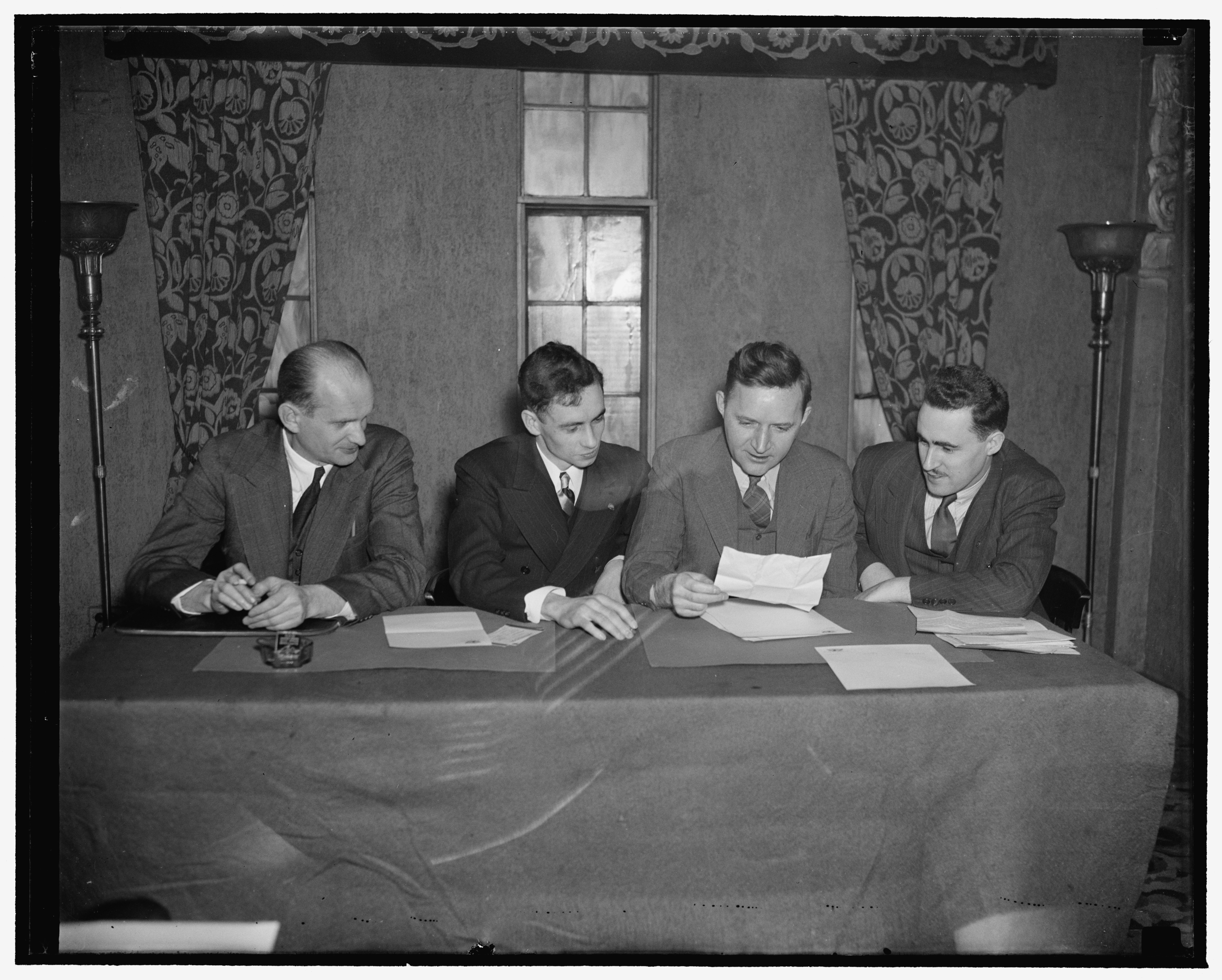
Carey (second from left) with other CIO leaders, 1938

Carey's first job was as an electrical worker in the radio laboratory of the Philadelphia Storage Battery Company (later the Philco Corporation). He began in 1929, while taking evening courses in electrical engineering at Drexel Institute.

Carey and six other workers at the Philco plant started the "Phil-Rod Fishing Club," primarily to organize a union. Discontinuing his studies at Drexel Institute, from 1931 to 1932 Carey attended the University of Pennsylvania's Wharton School of Finance and Commerce, where he took evening courses in industrial management, business forecasting, and finance. Under the National Industrial Recovery Act in June 1933, the radio factory set up a "Company Congress" to meet NRA collective bargaining requirements.

In October 1933, Carey was sent as a delegate from his local to the convention of the American Federation of Labor (AFL). Two months later, representatives of a dozen AFL and independent unions in the radio and electrical industries met in New York, established the Radio and Allied Trades National Labor Council, and elected Carey (then 22 years old) its first president.

Carey became President of the United Electrical Workers (UE) in 1936 during its formation. Under Carey's leadership the UE formed an affiliation with the new Congress of Industrial Organizations (CIO). In 1941, he broke with the UE due to Communist control.

From 1938 to 1955, Carey served as secretary-treasurer of the Congress of Industrial Organizations (CIO).

In 1948, Max Lowenthal, a Truman insider, recorded in his 1948 diary that Carey was CIO president Philip Murray's main conduit. He recorded a conversation in his diary thus:

M(ax): You know that although Jim Carey sees you, Phil Murry has been saying for three years that he has no real access to the White House.
D(avid): You should see how much Jim Carey has been in my hair these past few weeks!

In 1950, Carey helped found and became first president of UE rival International Union of Electrical, Radio, and Machine Workers, also known as the International Union of Electrical Workers (IUE), which the CIO helped found and where he served until 1965. Today, the IUE is part of the Communications Workers of America (CWA).

In 1955, when the CIO rejoined the AFL to form the AFL-CIO, Carey became vice-president of AFL–CIO.

=== Government service ===
In 1946, U.S. President Harry S. Truman appointed Carey to the President's Committee on Civil Rights.

From 1965 to 1972, Carey served as labor representative to the United Nations Association, where he helped influence the CIO's pulling out from the WFTU and forming of an alternative International Confederation of Free Trade Unions (ICFTU) organization, dedicated to promoting free trade and democratic unionism worldwide.

== Personal life and death ==
Carey married the former Margaret McCormick in 1938. They had two children, James and Patricia.

Carey died on September 11, 1973, of a heart attack at his home in Silver Spring, Maryland. He was survived by his wife and children. He was interred at Gate of Heaven Cemetery in Silver Spring, Maryland.

== Legacy ==
The James B. Carey Library at Rutgers University is named for him. An exhibition documenting his career, "James B. Carey: Labor's Boy Wonder", was produced at Rutgers in 2006.

More of Carey's archival records are housed at the Walter P. Reuther Library of Labor and Urban Affairs, the Harry S. Truman Library and Museum and the John F. Kennedy Presidential Library and Museum.

== External sources ==
- Carey, James B. (1960). Reminiscences of James Barron Carey: oral history, 1958 (abstract). Columbia Center for Oral History. ISBN 0884550346. Retrieved March 19, 2016.
- Spencer, Thomas E. (1998). Where They're Buried: A Directory Containing More Than Twenty Thousand Names of Notable Persons Buried in American Cemeteries, With Listings of Many Prominent People Who Were Cremated. Baltimore, Md.: Clearfield Co. p. 339. ISBN 9780806348230.

Trade union offices
Preceded by New position	President of the United Electrical, Radio and Machine Workers of America; 1936–1941	Succeeded by Albert Fitzgerald
Preceded by Charles P. Howard	Secretary of the Congress of Industrial Organizations; 1938–1955	Succeeded by Federation merged
Preceded by New position	President of the International Union of Electrical Workers; 1950–1965	Succeeded by Paul Jennings
Preceded by Department founded	Secretary=Treasurer of the Industrial Union Department, AFL-CIO; 1955–1965	Succeeded by Post vacant Next incumbent: Jacob Clayman
