= Paul Weber (unionist) =

20th-century American labor leader

Paul Weber was an American labor leader. He was the founder and president of the Detroit (Michigan) chapter of the Association of Catholic Trade Unionists (ACTU) from 1939 to 1947, best known for his development of an ACTU "Industrial Council Plan" (which Weber called "economic democracy") versus a CIO Industry Council Plan to foster union-management cooperation in US Labor disputes.

Weber also belonged to the American Newspaper Guild (now NewsGuild-CWA), a CIO federation member, which made him "well-versed in union practices."

He also served as editor of Wage Earner, newspaper of the Michigan ACTU.

In 1946, Weber wrote to some Catholic leaders around the nation in defense of Walter Reuther, who he wrote "Walter Reuther is certainly not a Communist... he is their bete noir" even if "Walter and his brothers Victor and Roy started out to be radicals."

In 1947 during a conference of the Catholic Trl-State Congress in Grand Rapids, Michigan, Weber, "Detroit newspaperman and Association of Catholic Trade Unionists leader," joined other Catholics in opposing Communist influence on labor unions.

== Works ==
- "ACTU," Christian Front (December, 1938)
