= Godfrey P. Schmidt =

American lawyer

Godfrey P. Schmidt (1903 –1998) was an American lawyer involved in anti-Communist and anti-union activities who represented Bella Dodd and worked against Jimmy Hoffa.

== Background ==
Godfrey P. Schmidt was born on July 15, 1903, in the Bronx borough of New York City. He graduated in 1925 from Fordham University with his B.A. and took his law degree in 1930 from that same institution.

== Career ==
On September 9, 1952, Schmidt served as legal counsel to former Communist and Teachers Union official Bella Dodd when she testified before the SISS in Manhattan.

Schmidt was particularly noted for his stance against Jimmy Hoffa.

He served on the board of National Review magazine and was the first candidate for Governor of New York State on the Conservative Party ticket.

== Personal life and death ==
Schmidt lived most of his life in New York City, until the last few years of his life when he lived with his daughter in Virginia.

Godfrey P. Schmidt died on September 27, 1998.
