= Association of Catholic Trade Unionists =

The Association of Catholic Trade Unionists (ACTU) was a labor organization associated with Catholic Worker newspaper (founded in 1933 by Dorothy Day and Peter Maurin).

== History ==
The Association of Catholic Trade Unionists, or ACTU, formed in founded in February 1937.

The ACTU encouraged Pope Pius XI's March 1937 anti-communist encyclical Divini Redemptoris and promoted mainstream Catholic teachings in the United States labor movement. It served as a hub for Catholics who opposed the growing influence of communists and other radical trade union organizers affiliated with the Communist Party USA. While not a union itself, the ACTU sought to "educate, stimulate, and coordinate on a Christian basis the action of the Catholic workingmen and women in the American labor movement."

The ACTU played an important role in opposing left-wings in a number of unions. Such unions including the United Electrical, Radio and Machine Workers of America (UE) and Transport Workers Union of America (TWUA). It played a particularly important role in building the International Union of Electrical Workers, which split from UE. In late 1939, the ACTU described the Congress of Industrial Organizations (CIO) as a "breeding nest of American Communism."

Following World War II, the ACTU declined and eventually dissolved in the late 1960s.

== Notable members ==
- John C. Cort
- John F. Henning
- Charles Owen Rice
- Paul Weber (unionist)
- Frank Andolina
