= James J. Matles =

American trade union leader

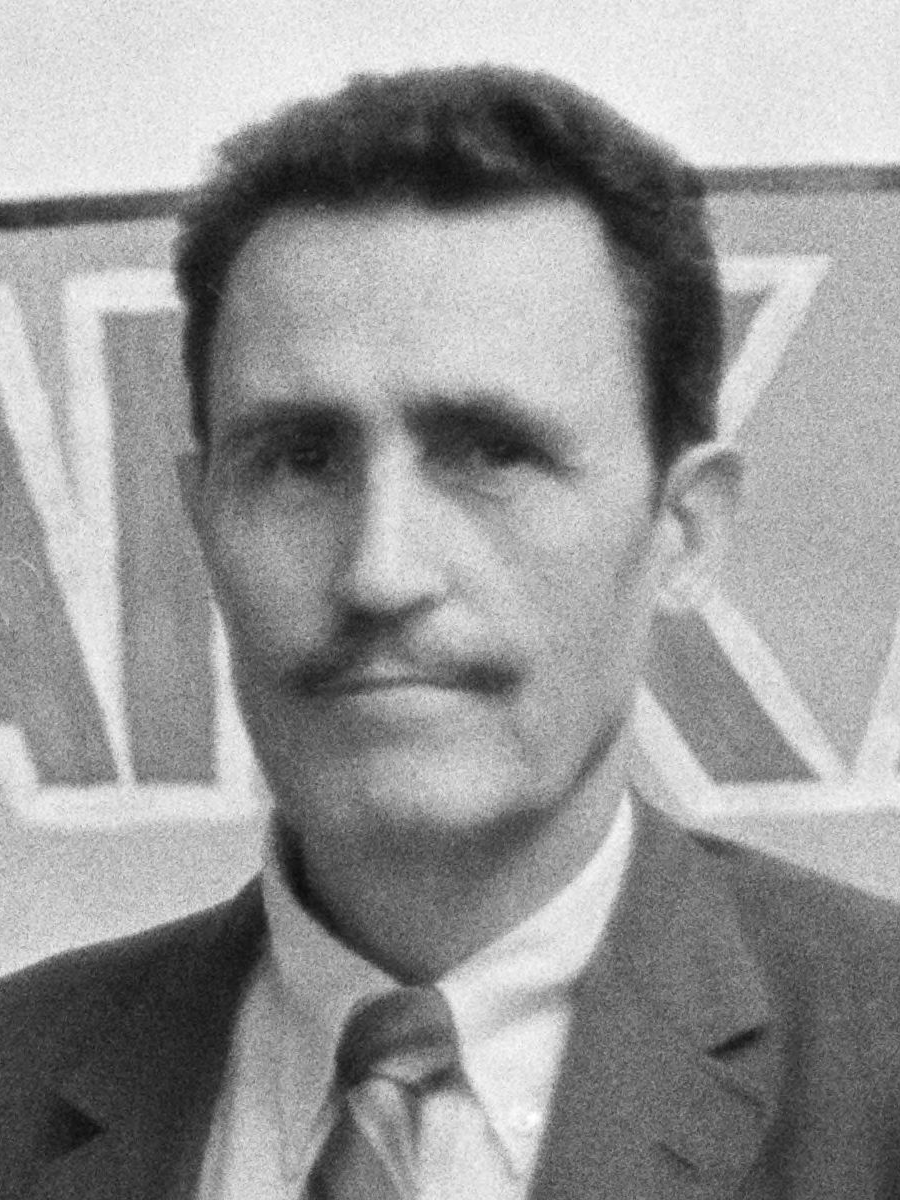
Matles in 1972

James J. Matles (February 24, 1909-September 15, 1975) was an American trade union leader. Matles was a top official in the United Electrical, Radio and Machine Workers of America (UE) from 1937 until his retirement just days before his sudden death following the 1975 UE convention in California. According to Life magazine, he was a communist sympathizer "conceded even by his right-wing enemies to be a brilliant leader."

Matles was born in Soroca, Romania (now Moldova) to Jewish parents.

== Works ==
- The Members Run This Union! New York: UE, 1947.
