= The Good Soldier (2009 film) =

- Directed by: Lexy Lovell; Michael Uys
- Produced by: Lexy Lovell; Michael Uys
- Edited by: Sikay Tang
- Music by: JJ Grey
- Release dates: October 9, 2009 (Hamptons); November 11, 2009 (United States)
- Running time: 80 minutes
- Country: United States
- Language: English

The Good Soldier is a 2009 documentary film directed and produced by American filmmakers Lexy Lovell and Michael Uys. Using interviews with five veterans from different generations of American wars, the film explores the definition of what being a 'good soldier' really means.

Howard Zinn, author of A People's History of the United States and a former bombardier in World War II, served as an advisor to the filmmakers.

== Synopsis ==
The documentary follows five American veterans from World War II, the Vietnam War, the Gulf War, and the Iraq War as they enlist, participate in combat, and alter their perspectives on war and military service. The Good Soldier asks what constitutes a good soldier and whether it includes the ability to kill. The film features interviews with veterans who enlisted in 1944, 1966, 1991, or 2003, detailing their experiences during combat and their subsequent reflections on national service. These interviews are combined with combat archival footage depicting military conflict. The featured veterans later chose to advocate for peace.

== Soundtrack and music ==
Two songs by JJ Grey and Mofro were used and original music was composed for the film by JJ Grey. Additional songs by Nine Inch Nails, Crosby, Stills, Nash and Young, Edwin Starr, and Big Bill Broonzy were used.

== Release ==
The documentary was previewed at the National Veterans for Peace Convention 2009 in College Park, MD August 5–9, 2009. The premiere was at the Hamptons International Film Festival on October 9, 2009, where it was picked up for limited theatrical distribution by Artistic License Films of New York. The international premiere was at the Levante Film Festival in Italy.

The Good Soldier opened theatrically nationwide on Veterans Day, November 11, 2009. The opening was coordinated with an event called "A National Day of Conversation", in which combat veterans, many of them members of VFP, hosted question and answer sessions with audiences. On November 6, 2009, as the feature component of his special Veterans Day edition of Bill Moyers Journal, Mr. Moyers broadcast a fifty-minute version of the documentary. During this broadcast, the "National Day of Conversation" was announced.

== Critical reception ==
From Daily Variety :"Skillfully interweaving the stories of five different servicemen from four different conflicts, "The Good Soldier" is a surprisingly nondoctrinaire docu about anti-war veterans that marches to its own drummer." The majority of reviews were positive. Kam Williams wrote: "co-directors Lexy Lovell and Michael Uys deserve a 21-gun salute for fashioning a sobering antidote to all that patriotic claptrap about serving God, country and apple pie..." Nicolas Rapold in Time Out New York called it "deeply moving," and Aaron Hillis of The Village Voice described the film as "shocking and affecting". Jason Albert of the Onion.com (AV Club) said..."It's hard to imagine watching a more affecting movie than The Good Soldier...it may be as affecting a movie as I've ever seen. I found it both hard to watch and hard to turn away from. Really powerful stuff." Matthew Nestel of Box Office Magazine called the film "arresting with troves of detailed memories pouring out for the first time." It was also praised by Hiphamptons.com: "the film should be mandatory viewing for every President and member of Congress."

The film scored 77% for critic approval, out of 13 reviews, on Rotten Tomatoes. Joseph Jon Lanthier from Slant Magazine gave the film 2.5 stars out of 4; he praised the film's topic of anti-war idea but believed that "its idealistic agenda grows tiresome despite its legitimacy." From The New York Times, Neil Genzlinger called The Good Soldier "an attack on the military, drenched in blood" and said that while the film had compelling stories, the five interviewees in film were "hardly representative of veterans."

== Awards ==
On Saturday November 21, 2009 "The Good Soldier" won the Maysles Brothers Award for Best Documentary from the jury at the Starz Denver Film Festival. On Monday September 27, 2010 "The Good Soldier" won the Emmy Award for Outstanding Historical Programming - Long Form.

== Other media ==
The Good Soldier Received much advance coverage from media outlets such as The Huffington Post and Daily Kos. In addition public statements about the film were made by individual chapters of VFP and the Daily Gazette of Schenectady, NY ran an editorial titled "A gift to all veterans for Veterans Day" about the upcoming premiere. Documentary Magazine wrote about the film in a feature article titled "War Stories: The Good Soldier examines the cost of combat." The film was also publicly endorsed by U.S. Labor Against the War.
