= Amy Newell =

Amy Newell (born 1948) is an American trade union leader. She served as general secretary-treasurer of the United Electrical, Radio and Machine Workers of America (UE) from 1985 to 1994. She was also elected to the National Executive Board of the Coalition of Labor Union Women.

Newell began her career as a volunteer organizer for UE in northern California's District 10. She was a worker-organizer in a factory owned by Siliconics in Silicon Valley and helped establish the union's decade-long Electronics Organizing Committee in the overwhelmingly non-unionized industry. In October 1974, she was hired by UE as a full-time organizer and relocated to western Massachusetts where helped win several key victories. A year later, she was relocated to Charleston, South Carolina, where UE was engaged in a prolonged and ultimately successful campaign to win recognition at a General Electric turbine plant. From 1977 to 1979, she was assigned to Waynesboro, Virginia and from 1979–80 to Philadelphia.

In 1985, Newell was elected General Secretary-Treasurer of UE, becoming the first woman elected to national office in a U.S. manufacturing union. She replaced Boris Block, who retired.

She is one of the original organizers of United States Labor Against The War (now called U.S. Labor Against Racism and War). USLAW formed to oppose the 2003 invasion of Iraq.

== Family ==
Both of Newell's parents, Charles and Ruth, were staff members employed by UE. Her father was an Irish-born business agent for Local 601 in East Pittsburgh and one of the union's founders. He was accused by anti-communist priest Charles Owen Rice of having ties to the Communist Party. Her mother was an organizer in western Pennsylvania.
