= John C. Cort =

American activist (1913–2006)

- Born: John Cyrus Cort; December 3, 1913; New York City, New York, US
- Died: August 3, 2006 (aged 92); Nahant, Massachusetts, US
- Education: Harvard University
- Occupation: Editor
- Employer: Commonweal
- Movement: Christian socialism
- Spouse: Helen Haye Cort (m. 1946)

John Cyrus Cort (1913–2006) was an American Catholic socialist writer and activist. He was the co-chair of the Religion and Socialism Commission of the Democratic Socialists of America.

He was based in metropolitan Boston, Massachusetts. He fathered 10 children with his wife, Helen Haye Cort, and he cantored in his local parish until his death.

== Biography ==
John Cyrus Cort was born in Woodmere, New York, on December 3, 1913, to Ambrose Cort, a public school teacher, and Lydia (Painter) Cort. He attended a public school in Hempstead, New York, for seven years. Raised Episcopal, he attended the choir school of the Cathedral of St. John the Divine in New York City from the age of 10. He completed his secondary education at the Taft School in Watertown, Connecticut.

After graduating from Harvard College cum laude in 1935 and converting to Catholicism, Cort was moved by a speech by Dorothy Day in May 1936. The novel Moon Gaffney, by Harry Sylvester, was dedicated to Cort and Day. He was one of the earliest Catholic Workers who started at the Mott Street House in 1936. He worked with the Catholic Worker for a few years. He helped found the Association of Catholic Trade Unionists and for several years he edited their periodical, the Labor Leader. He served on the editorial staff of Commonweal magazine from 1943 to 1959. In 1949, he joined with picketers during the 1949 Calvary Cemetery strike. In the early 1960s he was a regional director of the Peace Corps in the Philippines, and was appointed by Governor Endicott Peabody as the director of the Massachusetts Commonwealth Service Corps. In the 1970s he directed the Model Cities Program in Lynn, Massachusetts, and administered a number of Great Society social programs in Roxbury, Massachusetts.

Cort married Helen Haye in 1946.

Cort wrote several books and articles for magazines. He was the founding editor of the Religion and Socialism Commission's Religious Socialism magazine. He contributed to the American Friends Service Committee's Peacework magazine.

He was described as "personally conservative but socially and politically radical, well-read but never pedantic, funny, chivalrous, of broad culture but a man of the people." Unlike most Catholic Workers, John Cort was not a pacifist, but he did oppose the Vietnam War using just war theory.

Cort died August 3, 2006, in Nahant, Massachusetts, and was buried at Greenlawn Cemetery in Nahant. Cort's papers are housed at the American Catholic History Research Center and University Archives at the Catholic University of America.

== Selected bibliography ==
- Christian Socialism: An Informal History. Maryknoll, New York: Orbis Books. 1988. ISBN 978-0-88344-600-3.
- Dreadful Conversions: The Making of a Catholic Socialist. New York: Fordham University Press. 2003. ISBN 978-0-8232-2256-8.

== See also ==
- Catholic social teaching
- NewsGuild-CWA
