= International Union of Electrical Workers =

North American labor union

The International Union of Electrical Workers (IUE) was a North American labor union representing workers in the electrical manufacturing industry. While consistently using the acronym IUE, it took on several full names during its history originally the International Union of Electrical, Radio and Machine Workers and after 1987, the International Union of Electronic, Electrical, Technical, Salaried, Machine and Furniture Workers.

== Founding ==
The IUE grew out of a dispute in the United Electrical, Radio and Machine Workers of America (UE). The UE had been founded in 1936 and was given the first Congress of Industrial Organizations (CIO) charter in 1938. As in many of the new CIO unions organized in the 1930s, the membership and leaders of UE included a variety of radicals, including socialists and communists, as well as New Deal liberals and Catholics. Concerned about the rise of fascism, these diverse forces put aside differences to form a "Popular Front." The UE's first President was James Carey, a follower of Catholic Social teaching, and Secretary-Treasurer Julius Emspak was allied with the Communist Party.

In 1941, however, the Communist faction moved to take total control and voted Carey out as president. Opposition emerged with Socialist and New Deal elements forming "UE Members for Democratic Action", modeled on the liberal, anti-Communist "Americans for Democratic Action." The Catholic element worked with the Association of Catholic Trade Unionists.

Between 1946 and 1949, the so-called "right wing" (as the anti-Communist faction was referred to) led an effort to win back leadership of the UE. While the anti-Communists built support, with the expulsion of the UE from the CIO in 1949, a new tactic was used of forming a new union – the IUE – with Carey as its leader. With the support of the CIO, over 300,000 former UE members joined the IUE in its first three years. While academics debate whether to call it union raids, the IUE relied on NLRB elections to determine which union had the right to represent workers. By the mid-1950s, the IUE had easily overtaken the UE as the dominant union in electrical manufacturing.

== Boulwarism ==
As the major union at the General Electric Co., IUE confronted "Boulwarism." Lemuel Boulware was GE's vice president for labor relations from 1947 to 1960. Under Boulware, GE would present the company's contract offer to the union and no revisions would be made. The point was to make collective bargaining meaningless and lessen the value of the union in the eyes of its members. In 1964, the National Labor Relations Board declared such tactics to be unfair labor practices.

== Later activities ==
The IUE was one of the leading forces in the civil rights movement. IUE President James Carey chaired the AFL-CIO Civil Rights Committee and the IUE played a leading role in the 1963 March on Washington.

In October 1969, IUE and UE called a joint strike against GE after negotiations failed to result in a new contract. The strike, which involved 164,000 workers across the country over 102 days, ended in a major victory for workers.

In 1972, IUE filed a discrimination lawsuit against Westinghouse Electric, claiming that Westinghouse's wage structure resulted in less pay for women than men earned for comparable jobs. Women at Westinghouse earned only 80 percent of that of men doing similar work. IUE's victory in the suit helped establish the legal basis for pay equity.

In 1987, the United Furniture Workers of America, another CIO union, merged with the IUE.

On October 1, 2000, the IUE merged with the Communications Workers of America (CWA) and now forms the Industrial Division of CWA. IUE-CWA now represents over 45,000 manufacturing and industrial workers in a wide range of industries including automotive, aerospace, furniture, and appliances.

== Leadership ==
=== Presidents ===
1950: James B. Carey
1965: Paul Jennings
1976: David J. Fitzmaurice
1982: William H. Bywater
1996: Ed Fire

2004: James Clark

2018: Carl Kennebrew

=== Secretary-Treasurers ===
1950: William Snoots
1951: Al Hartnett
1962: George Collins
1968: David J. Fitzmaurice
1976: George Hutchins
1978: William H. Bywater
1982: Ed Fire
1996: Ron Gilvin
1998: Thomas J. Rebman

== See also ==
- Boulwarism
- Gloria T. Johnson
