= Union raid =

Trade unions taking over the membership of another union

A union raid is when a challenger or outsider trade union tries to take over the membership base of an existing incumbent union, typically through a union raid election in the United States and Canada.

Union raids have been criticized by the labor movement because they promote rivalry between unions and direct resources away from organizing the non-unionized workforce in the United States and Canada, a majority of the total workforce.

== History ==
Raids can be informal through campaigning and or soliciting an incumbent union's members or more direct by an outsider union calling for a decertification election in a bid to take over an incumbent union's membership. Between 1975 and 1989 over 1,414 multi-union raid elections were documented by the NLRB in the United States. In Canada, official data on scale and success of union raids is limited to the Federal government and the province of British Columbia. A research study on Ontario, Canada's most populous province, found 1,046 multi-union raids elections between 1975 and 2003, with 181 raids attributed to the Canadian Auto Workers and SEIU Healthcare raids over the years 2001–2002.

=== United Electrical Workers ===
After the Taft-Hartley Act in 1947, a number of union raid elections were enacted by the CIO; (Note: In 1955 the AFL and CIO merged to form the AFL–CIO) against the recently expelled left-wing union affiliates, accounting for almost half of all union raids in the year 1950. The majority of these raids were between the expelled United Electrical Workers and the newly formed anti communist CIO affiliate International Union of Electrical Workers. (Note: Today the IUF is affiliated with Communications Workers of America) It is debated whether they should be considered union raids. Many union locals were effectively voting on which faction of the split "United Electric Workers" they wanted to affiliate with.

=== No raid agreements ===
Raiding by the AFL affiliated Teamsters union was such a serious issue that it prompted the trade union centers AFL, and CIO, who had attempted to sign a no-raid agreement for years, to finally negotiate and implement such a pact in December 1953. Initially Teamsters president Beck refused to sign the agreement and threatened to withdraw the Teamsters from the AFL if forced to adhere to it. Three months after the pact was signed, the Teamsters agreed to submit to the terms of the no-raid agreement. Shortly thereafter, the AFL adopted Article 20 of its constitution, which forbade its member unions from raiding one another.

In 1968 the Alliance for Labor Action made up of the United Auto Workers and the Teamsters, (Note: In 1956 Teamsters was ejected by the newly merged AFL-CIO due to corruption scandals.) offered the AFL–CIO a no-raid pact as a first step toward building a working relationship between the competing trade union centers, but the offer was rejected.

Since 1992, the AFL–CIO constitution has contained a clause inside Article XX forbidding union raids among its affiliates with various remedies for resolving inter-union conflict.
