= Lemuel Boulware =

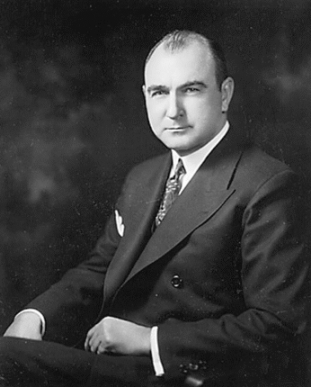
- A portrait of Lemuel Boulware
- Born: June 3, 1895; Springfield, Kentucky, U.S.
- Died: November 7, 1990 (aged 95); Delray Beach, Florida, U.S.

Lemuel Ricketts Boulware (June 3, 1895 – November 7, 1990) was an American business executive who was vice president of labor and community relations for General Electric from 1956 until 1961. Boulware's business tutelage and political cultivation of Ronald Reagan from 1954 to 1962 while Reagan was a spokesman for the company is argued to have led to Reagan's conversion from New Deal-style liberalism to Barry Goldwater-style conservatism.

Boulware's aggressive 20-year-long policy of "take-it-or-leave-it" bargaining by GE became known as "Boulwarism". He devised the strategy in reaction to success in the 1946 general strikes by the United Electrical, Radio and Machine Workers of America (UE) and the other two largest unions of the Congress of Industrial Organizations (CIO). Bouleware has also been noted for his effective and innovative use of surveys and interviews of General Electric employees, to test which anti-union messages resonated most with staff.

US Historian Rick Perlstein described Boulware as "the most influential American most people have never heard of." Perlstein argues that Boulware "conceptualized a way to promote the sort of right-wing politics traditionally favored by corporate behemoths—low taxes and neutralized union power; ...as a problem in modern marketing."

== Published works ==
- Boulware, Lemuel R. (1969). The Truth About Boulwarism: Trying to Do Right Voluntarily. Washington D.C.: Bureau of National Affairs. pp. 180.
