= Jung Mo Sung =

South Korean-born Brazilian theologian (born 1957)

- Born: 1957 (age 68–69); Seoul, South Korea

Korean name
- Hangul: 성정모
- Hanja: 成定模
- RR: Seong Jeongmo
- MR: Sŏng Chŏngmo

Jung Mo Sung (born 1957) is a South Korean-born Brazilian Roman Catholic lay theologian, writer and lecturer trained in theology, ethics, and education. He was born in South Korea, and raised in Brazil where he lives today.

Sung is currently a professor in the graduate program of Religious Studies at the Methodist University of São Paulo, in the area of liberation theology and economic theological critique of neoliberalism.

== Beliefs ==
Sung works within the paradigm of liberation theology and can be considered a "next generation" or "third generation" theologian-practitioner. He is particularly concerned with the relationship between theology and the economy as well as education theory in view of solidarity.

Though he may be viewed as rejecting the idea that some sort of historical subject, whether God, the proletariat, or even a particular set of social institutions, will bring into history the utopian dream of a truly just, peaceful, and harmonious society, he is not passive in the face of injustice. Sung has worked directly with basic ecclesial communities as an advisor, speaking regularly at various ecumenical events that focus on justice and solidarity, and writing scholarly books as well as those aimed directly at those laypersons who are involved in particular struggles for justice. He speaks passionately about justice, while having a sense of what may be temporally attainable.

== Early life ==
Sung was born in Seoul, South Korea in 1957 as the eldest son of Sung Nak-cheon (성낙천; 成洛天). He attended the Samcheong Elementary School there before moving to Paraná, Brazil with his family in 1966. He has remained there ever since.

Sung received his undergraduate degree in philosophy in 1984, a doctorate in religious studies in 1993 (from the Methodist University of São Paulo, under the direction of Júlio de Santa Ana), and did post-doctoral work in education in 2000 (at the Methodist University of Piracicaba with Hugo Assmann).

== Employment ==
Sung is currently a professor in the graduate program of religious studies at the Methodist University of São Paulo, where he has been teaching since 1994. From 1996 to 2006 he was also a professor in the graduate program at the Pontifical Catholic University of São Paulo.

He has served as an informal associate of the "Departamento Ecuménico de Investigaciones," a research institute in Costa Rica founded by Franz Hinkelammert, Hugo Assmann and Pablo Richard Guzmán.

== Impact abroad ==
Several of Sung's texts have been translated into Korean, Italian, Spanish, English and German.

The publication of Desire, Market and Religion in 2007 brought Sung's work into English as the sole author of a book-length project for the first time. He has gained prominence and exposure in the USA, speaking, for example, at the American Academy of Religion.

=== Influence and Citations ===
Jung Mo Sung's work is mainly based on Spanish- and Portuguese-language academic discourse in Latin America. However, his work has also been discussed in international publications, including:

- "The Future of Liberation Theology: An Argument and Manifesto" by Ivan Petrella
- "Queer Eye for the Straight Guy: The Making Over of Liberation Theology, A Queer Discursive Approach" by Ivan Petrella
- Latin American Perspectives on Globalization: Ethics, Politics" by Mario Sáenz
- Liberation Theology And Sexuality" by Marcella Althaus-Reid
- "The Encyclopedia of Christianity" by Erwin Fahlbusch, et al.
- "Religion in the New Millennium: Theology in the Spirit of Paul Tillich" by Raymond F. Bulman, Frederick J. Parrella
- "Interpreting the Postmodern: Responses to "Radical Orthodoxy" by Rosemary Radford Ruether, Marion Grau
- "The War of Gods: Religion and Politics in Latin America" by Michael Lowy
- "Liberation Theologies on Shifting Grounds" by Georges de Schrijver
- "Christ & Empire: From Paul to Postcolonial Times" by Joerg Rieger
- "The Blackwell Companion to the Bible and Culture" by John F. A. Sawyer
- "Global Ethics And Civil Society" by John Eade, Darren J. O'Byrne
- "Out of the Depths: Women's Experience of Evil and Salvation" by Ivone Gebara
- "In Search of the Good Life: The Ethics of Globalization" by Rebecca Todd Peters
- "Religion in a Secular City: Essays in Honor of Harvey Cox" by Harvey Gallagher Cox, Arvind Sharma
- "An Introduction to Third World Theologies" by John Parratt
- "Liberation Theologies, Postmodernity, and the Americas" by David Batstone
- "Theologies in the Old Testament" by Erhard S. Gerstenberger
- "Moral Theology: New Directions and Fundamental Issues" by James Keating

== Publications ==
=== English ===
- Across Borders: Latin Perspectives in the Americas Reshaping Religion, Theology, and Life, edited by Joerg Rieger. Lexington Books, 2013
- The Subject, Capitalism and Religion: Horizons of Hope in Complex Society. New York: Palgrave Macmillan, 2011.
- Beyond the Spirit of Empire: Theology and Politics in a New Key by Joerg Rieger Page, Jung Mo Sung, and Nestor Miguez. SCM Reclaiming Liberation Theology Series, 2009.
- Desire, Market, and Religion, SCM Press Reclaiming Liberation Theology Series, 2007.
- "Theology, Spirituality, and the Market," in: Another Possible World, eds. Marcella Althaus-Reid, Ivan Petrella, and Luiz Carlos Susin. SCM Press, 2007.
- "What Is Behind the Notification of Jon Sobrino?" in Getting the Poor Down from the Cross: Christology of Liberation, José María VIGIL (organizer), International Theological Commission of the Ecumenical Association of Third World Theologians, 2007.
- "The Human Being as Subject: Defending the Victims," in: Latin American Liberation Theology: The Next Generation, ed. Ivan Petrella. Orbis Books, 2005.
- "Economics and Theology: Reflections on the Market, Globalization, and the Kingdom of God," in: Global Capitalism, Liberation Theology and the Social Sciences, eds. P. M. Zulehner, A. Tausch, A. Müller. Nova Science, 2000.
- "Hunger For God, Hunger For Bread, Hunger For Humanity," in: Hope and Justice for All in the Americas: Discerning God's Mission, ed. Oscar Bolioli. New York: Friendship Press, 1998.

=== Portuguese ===
- Pensamento crítico e profecia: 100 anos do 'Capitalismo como Religião' de Walter Benjamin (with Allan Coelho) 2022
- O caminho espiritual para a felicidade 2021
- Direitos humanos e amor ao próximo: textos teológicos em diálogo com a vida real. São Paulo: Recriar, 2020. (with Ivone Gebara)
- Idolatria do dinheiro e direitos humanos: uma crítica teológica do novo mito do capitalismo. São Paulo: Paulus, 2018.
- A graça de Deus e a loucura do mundo. São Paulo: Reflexão, 2016. (ISBN 978-85-8088-153-0, 191 pp.)
- Para além do espírito do Império. São Paulo: Paulinas, 2012. (with Néstor Míguez and Joerg Rieger)
- Missão e educação teológica. São Paulo: ASTE, 2011 (with Néstor Miguez and Lauri Wirth)
- Deus em nós: o reinado que acontece no amor solidário aos pobres" (with Hugo Assmann), Paulus, 2010.
- Cristianismo de Libertação", Paulus, 2008.
- Um Caminho Espiritual para a Felicidade, Vozes, 2007.
- Educar para Reencantar a Vida, Vozes, 2006.
- Sementes de Esperança: A Fé em um Mundo em Crise, Vozes, 2005.
- Competência e Sensibilidade Solidária: Educar para Esperança, with Hugo Assmann, Vozes, 2000.
- Conversando sobre Ética e Sociedade, Vozes, 1995.
- Teologia e Economia: Repensando A Teologia da Libertação e Utopias, Vozes, 1994.
- Deus Numa Economia Sem Coração. Neoliberalismo e Pobreza: Desafios À Evangelização, Paulus, 1992.
