= Ellsberg =

Ellsberg is a surname. Notable people with the surname include:

- Daniel Ellsberg (1931–2023), American military analyst and whistleblower
- Edward Ellsberg (1891–1983), American military writer
- Mary Carroll Ellsberg (born 1958), American epidemiologist
- Michael Ellsberg (born 1977), American author
- Robert Ellsberg (born 1955), American non-fiction writer

== See also ==
- Ellsberg paradox
- Nathaniel A. Elsberg (1872–1932), New York politician
