= Elfsberg =

Elfsberg is a Swedish surname. Notable people with the surname include:

- Claes Elfsberg (born 1948), Swedish television journalist
- Joa Elfsberg (born 1979), Swedish ice hockey player

== See also ==
- Ellsberg
