= Hugo Assmann =

Brazilian Catholic theologian (1933–2008)

- Born: 22 July 1933; Venâncio Aires, Rio Grande do Sul, Brazil
- Died: 22 February 2008 (aged 74); Piracicaba, São Paulo, Brazil
- Spouse: Mel Assmann

Academic background
- Education: Central Seminary of Saint Leopold; Pontifical Gregorian University; Goethe University Frankfurt
- Thesis: A Dimensão social do pecado (1961)

Academic work
- Discipline: Theology
- School or tradition: Liberation theology
- Institutions: Methodist University of Piracicaba

Ecclesiastical career
- Religion: Christianity (Roman Catholic)
- Church: Latin Church
- Ordained: 1961 (priest)

Hugo Assmann (1933–2008) was a Brazilian Catholic theologian who helped develop the ideas surrounding liberation theology following the Second Vatican Council. He was a firebrand critic of the conservative values held by the Catholic orthodoxy, and believed firmly that the role of the Church should be to alleviate the suffering of the global poor. A prolific advocate for liberation theology, Assmann's work and participation in the movement forced him to move between numerous countries throughout Latin America throughout the course of his life.

== Biography ==
Assmann was born on 22 July 1933 in Venâncio Aires, Rio Grande do Sul, Brazil. He undertook studies in philosophy at the Central Seminary of Saint Leopold (1951–1960) and theology at the Pontifical Gregorian University in Rome (1954–1958). Assmann also studied sociology at the Goethe University Frankfurt, Germany. He then received his doctorate in theology from the Pontifical Gregorian University in 1961 in Rome, becoming an ordained priest, with a thesis on "the social dimension of sin."

Returning to Brazil, Assmann settled in Porto Alegre, where he was vicar of the parish of Our Lady of Montserrat and teacher at Viamão Seminary. During this period his work developed around the theology of development through the seminary magazine. With the rise of the military dictatorship in Brazil in 1964, and the passage of Institutional Act No. 5 in 1968, Assmann went to Uruguay, Bolivia, and Salvador Allende's Chile. During this period he developed his reflections on the theology of revolution. In 1973 he published Teologia desde la praxis de la Libertacion, which marked his transition to liberation theology. With the fall of Allende, Assman went to Costa Rica, where along with Franz Hinkelammert, he developed his theological reflections on the relationship between theology and economics in the Department of Ecumenical Investigaciones (DEI), which the two founded in 1974. This center would be one of the leading ideological breeding grounds of liberation theology. Assmann also helped found the Ecumenical Association of Third World Theologians in 1976 and the Brazilian Society of Theology and Religious Studies. Once again returning to Brazil in 1981, he became Professor of Philosophy of Education and Communication at the Methodist University of Piracicaba. In total, Assmann spent 12 years exiled in Germany.

Assmann died on 22 February 2008 in Piracicaba, São Paulo. The collection of his works (books and journals) was donated by his family to the Ecumenical Library Program Graduate in Sciences of Religion of the Methodist University of São Paulo (UMESP).

=== Contributions to Liberation Theology ===
Assmann was one of the first theologians to advocate for liberation theology. He strongly believed that the primary objective of Christian theology was to alleviate the suffering of the global poor. The suffering of the Third World, in his view, was caused by the inherent structural contradictions in capitalism's models of development; in his view, this situation has had the effect of priming the church to assume a revolutionary character. Like many other liberation theologians, Assmann's views on the emerging movement of liberation theology, and specifically its relationship to the idea of capitalist underdevelopment, were influenced heavily by the 1968 Medellin conference. Assmann argued that, prior to the advent of this new political theology, previously existing forms of theology only existed to serve the political status quo. To avoid this, he believed that the new political ideology must advocate to keep faith within the public sphere, stress the political dimensions of faith, and to regard the church as an institution of social critique. He denounced the idea that the Catholic Church should operate in a dualistic, separate relationship with the world, and instead insisted that the Church should work to build a unitary history with humanity. Assmann assesses that an apolitical church ultimately takes a political stance by allowing the political status quo to remain unchallenged.

1989 saw Assmann's work shift to the "idolatry of the market" as described in his book "A idolatria do mercado." Assmann criticized the ideological certainty under capitalism that the market must survive and, therefore, be sacrificed lives and the suffering of workers. Assmann's criticism in this argument is not necessarily of the market itself, which he recognizes the need of, but instead the cult of "absolutism" surrounding it in capitalist economies. This idolatry, therefore, becomes its own sort of religion in capitalist societies, and the market is held up as a sort of god. Ideas like the "self regulation of the market" under capitalism, therefore, take on a spiritual and naturalized value in everyday life. Assmann opposed all forms of idolatry, as the commitment to idols, in his eyes, deprived one of their connection to God. He even carried this criticism to forms of idolatry as they appeared in the Christian left and in broader Leftist politics of the time.

Assmann was one of the first liberation theologians to be influenced by the social sciences, to avoid falling into dogmatic idealism. His work has a strongly interdisciplinary and ecumenical character, transitioning between economics, social sciences, communication, and pedagogy. His reflection was not focused on dogmatic questions, but from the practices of liberation in regards to spiritual and emotional fulfillment in peoples' lives. Assmann was one of the first theologians to use the categories of Social Sciences in theological discourse. As liberation theology as an ideology fell out of favor in the public sphere over time, Assmann's work increasingly moved from the realm of theology to education. In the field of communication, Assmann's most notable publication was “A Igreja electronica e seu impact na América Latina” (1986) where he analyzed the ideological character of two radio and television programs controlled by North American broadcasters and their repercussions on Latin American Pentecostal movements.

== Works ==
- "Teología desde la praxis de liberación. Ensayo teológico desde la América dependiente" (1973)
- "Marx, K & Engels, F., Sobre la religión" (1979)
- "A trilateral. A nova fase do capitalismo mundial" (1986)
- "A idolatria do mercado. Um ensaio sobre economia e teologia" (1989)
- "Clamor dos pobres e “racionalidade” econômica" (1990)
- "Desafios e falácias. Ensaios sobre a conjuntura atual" (1991)
- "Crítica à lógica da exclusão. Ensaios sobre economia e teologia" (1994)
- "Reencantar a educação: rumo à sociedade aprendente" (2003)
- "Competência e Sensibilidade solidária: Educar para a Esperança, em co-autoria com" Jung Mo Sung (2000)
- "Curiosidade e prazer de aprender." (2004)
- "Redes digitais e metamorfoses do aprender, em co-autoria com: Rosana Pereira Lopes, Rosemeire Carvalho do Amaral Delcin, Gilberto Canto e Getúlio de Souza Nunes" (2005)
- "Deus em nós: o reinado de Deus que acontece no amor solidário aos pobres, em co-autoria com Jung Mo Sung" (2010)

== See also ==
- Leonardo Boff
- Catholic Church in Brazil

== Bibliography ==
- José Míguez Bonino: Theologie im Kontext der Befreiung. Vandenhoeck & Ruprecht, Göttingen 1977.
- Jung Mo Sung: The Human Being as Subject. Defending the Victims. In: Ivan Petrella: Latin American Liberation Theology. The Next Generation. Orbis Books, New York 2005.
- Hugo Assmann, Jung Mo Sung: Competência e sensibilidade solidária. Educar para a esperança. 2. Auflage. Editora Vozes, Petrópolis 2001.
