= Orbis Books =

American Catholic publishing company

- Parent company: Maryknoll Fathers and Brothers
- Founded: 1970
- Founder: Miguel D'Escoto and Philip J. Scharper
- Country of origin: United States
- Headquarters location: Maryknoll, New York
- Distribution: self-distributed (U.S.); Novalis (Canada); Alban Books (U.K.); Garratt Publishing (Australia); Claretian Communications (Philippines); St. Paul's India (India); Pleroma Christian Supplies (New Zealand); KCBS (Korea)
- Key people: Robert Ellsberg, Publisher
- Official website: www.orbisbooks.com

Orbis Books is an American imprint of the Maryknoll order. It has been a small but influential publisher of liberation theology works. It was founded by Nicaraguan Maryknoll priest Miguel D'Escoto with Philip J. Scharper in 1970. Its editor-in-chief is Robert Ellsberg.

== Major works ==
Orbis Books was the first to publish Gustavo Gutiérrez's A Theology of Liberation in the United States. It also published Ernesto Cardenal's The Gospel in Solentiname, and Richard Millett's Guardians of the Dynasty, a study of Nicaragua's National Guard. In 1976, they became the first publisher of future anti-apartheid activist Allan Boesak. It published Sebastian Kappen's Jesus and Freedom in 1977. In the 1980s, they carried titles by Daniel Berrigan and Phillip Berryman. Later authors include Haiti's Jean-Bertrand Aristide, South African missiologist David Bosch and 2007 Catholic Press Association prize winner Jens Söring. Orbis also published Walter Wink's Peace is the Way, an anthology of writings on nonviolence by the U.S. branch of the Fellowship of Reconciliation.
