= Instituto Superior Evangélico de Estudios Teológicos =

Institute based in Buenos Aires

The Instituto Superior Evangélico de Estudios Teológicos (ISEDET; Higher Evangelical Institute for Theological Studies), based in Buenos Aires, was a theological educational institution with a history spanning more than 131 years. The institute played a significant role in Protestant theological education in the Río de la Plata region (Argentina and Uruguay). It closed in 2015.

== History ==
The oldest predecessor of the Instituto appears to be the Facultad Evangélica de Teología, founded in Uruguay in 1880 and shortly thereafter moved to Buenos Aires. It merged in 1970 with the Facultad Luterana de Teología, also located in Buenos Aires, to form the Instituto Superior Evangélico de Estudios Teológicos. This merger involved a union of eight Protestant and Evangelical churches in the Río de la Plata region and also included influences from Chile, Peru, Venezuela, and Colombia.

The ISEDET University Institute most recently consisted of the following nine churches:

- Anglican Church
- Evangelical Church on La Plata
- Evangelical Waldensian Church
- Presbyterian Church of San Andrés
- Evangelical Church Disciples of Christ
- United Evangelical Lutheran Church
- Danish-Argentine Lutheran Church
- Evangelical Methodist Church of Argentina
- Reformed Churches of Argentina

On 23 May 2015, the dissolution of the institute was approved at the general assembly of the nine sponsoring churches. The main reason for the closure was a lack of state recognition. The ISEDET library, specializing in theology, biblical studies, religious studies, and humanities, remains available for use upon request.

== Famous graduates ==
- Marcella Althaus-Reid (1952–2009), Argentine-Scottish theologian and author.
