= Penny Lernoux =

American writer and journalist (1940–1989)

- Born: January 6, 1940; California, United States of America
- Died: October 9, 1989 (aged 49)
- Education: University of Southern California (USC)
- Occupation: Journalist
- Employer(s): Copley News Service, National Catholic Reporter, The Nation, The Chronicle of Higher Education
- Notable work: Cry of the People: The Struggle for Human Rights in Latin America
- Spouse: Denis Nahum

Penny Lernoux (January 6, 1940 – October 9, 1989) was an American educator, author, and journalist. She wrote critically of United States government and Papal policy toward Latin America.

== Life and works ==
Lernoux was born into a comfortable Catholic family in California and excelled in school. She enrolled in the University of Southern California in the late 1950s and, after being nominated to Phi Beta Kappa, qualified as a journalist for the United States Information Agency (USIA), a government arm devoted to promoting U.S. policy overseas. Lernoux began working in Latin America in 1961, just before the Second Vatican Council. She worked in Rio de Janeiro and Bogotá for the USIA until 1964 and then moved to Caracas to write for Copley News Service, to which she remained bound by contract until 1967.

By this time, Lernoux had grown aware of extreme contrasts between the wealth of Latin American politicians, businessmen and landlords, on the one hand, and the poverty of the region's masses, on the other. She adopted a radical view of Jesus Christ and tried to relate his teachings to Latin American struggles against economic exploitation and military dictatorship. As she became a freelance writer, Lernoux gravitated toward new Latin American expressions of Catholicism, notably base communities and liberation theology. Lernoux attracted major attention from her first book Cry of the People: The Struggle for Human Rights in Latin America, published in 1977. The book outlined her discoveries about Latin American history and extreme social inequality. Cry of the People won a Sidney Hillman Foundation Book Award in its third (1982) edition.

At that time, Lernoux joined the National Catholic Reporter as a Latin American correspondent and continued freelance reporting, most notably for The Nation. In the early 1980s Lernoux broadened her horizons to focus on international banking corruption. The topic was the theme of articles such as "The Miami Connection" (The Nation, February 18, 1984). Her second book, also published in 1984, In Banks We Trust: Bankers and Their Close Associates: The CIA, the Mafia, Drug Traders, Dictators, Politicians and the Vatican. The book exposed links from international banks to governments, the Catholic Church and organized crime, and how their corruption fueled the Third World debt crisis.

External audio
- "In Banks We Trust." (March 8, 1984). Iowa State University Lecture Series. Discussion on the ways that economically advantaged countries harm developing countries.

For the rest of her life, Lernoux focused largely on the clamping down on dissent by John Paul II and Joseph Cardinal Ratzinger (now Benedict XVI). This was the topic of her third book, People of God: The Struggle for World Catholicism, published in 1989 after years of research in Latin America and the United States. Unlike most of John Paul II's critics, Lernoux described his attempt to fortify an authoritarian model of the church as an effort to restore preconciliar (e.g. pre-Vatican II) Roman Catholicism. The book documented the church's dismissal of scholars who questioned John Paul II's papacy. It also dissected various groups struggling for control of the church and examined the popularity of Opus Dei, Communion and Liberation, the Knights of Malta and Tradition, Family and Property.

== Death ==
After the publication of People of God, Lernoux left Bogotá to work on a fourth book. This one focused on the Maryknoll Sisters. Later that year she was diagnosed with terminal lung cancer. Lernoux died on October 9, 1989, aged 49, a month after being hospitalized, leaving behind her husband Denis Nahum and their daughter Angela. Her husband, Denis Nahum, was born to a British Jewish family in the United Kingdom. They married in Miami, Florida. Denis died in 1997 in a traffic incident in Bogotá, Colombia, while their daughter Angela was driving.

Lernoux's final book was completed by Arthur Jones and Robert Ellsberg; it was published in 1993 as Hearts on Fire: The Story of the Maryknoll Sisters.

== Legacy ==
The Penny Lernoux Papers are held by the Marquette University Special Collections and University Archives. Lernoux was memorialized by the Penny Lernoux Memorial Library in Minneapolis until its parent organization closed in August 2007.

== Selected works ==
External videos
- Reel to Reel. Ep. 160 (June 17, 1984).

=== Books ===
- In Banks We Trust—Bankers and Their Close Associates: The CIA, the Mafia, Drug Traders, Dictators, Politicians, and the Vatican. New York: Anchor Press (1984). ISBN 978-0385183291. OCLC 230577909.
- Cry of the People: United States Involvement in the Rise of Fascism, Torture, and Murder and the Persecution of the Catholic Church in Latin America. Garden City, New York: Anchor Press / Doubleday (1980). ISBN 0385183291.
  - Republished (1982). New York: Penguin Books. ISBN 978-0140060478, with new preface and subtitle: The Struggle for Human Rights in Latin America—The Catholic Church in Conflict with U.S. Policy.
  - Republished (1991). New York: Penguin Books, with a new afterword by George Black.

=== Articles ===
- "Illusions of Agrarian Reform." The Nation (Oct. 15, 1973).
- "Nicaragua on the Brink." Inquiry (Mar. 6, 1978), p. 5.
- "Fascism in Brazil." Inquiry (Nov. 27, 1978), pp. 12–16.
- "Trading in Repression." Inquiry (Dec. 11, 1978), pp. 8–11.
- "Corrupting Colombia." Inquiry (Sep. 30, 1979), pp. 13–19.
- "The Latin American Church." Latin American Research Review, vol. 15, no. 2 (1980), pp. 201–211. Latin American Studies Association. JSTOR 2503053.
- "Grassroots Churches Unite Latin American Communities." Berkeley Barb, vol. 30, no. 11 (Feb. 21, 1980), p. 9. JSTOR community.28033740.
- "Blood Money." Penthouse (Apr. 1984).
- "When Republics Go Bananas." Massachusetts Review, vol. 27, no. 3/4 (Fall/Winter 1986), pp. 473–484. JSTOR 25089793.
- "Vatican Silences Brazilian Bishop." National Catholic Reporter (Sep. 30, 1988), p. 7.
- "Casting Out the 'People's Church.'" The Nation (Aug. 27–Sep. 3, 1988).
  - Republished as The Nation: 1865-1990: Selections from the Independent Magazine of Politics and Culture, edited by Katerina Vanden Heuvel. New York: Thunder's Mouth Press (1990), pp. 416–422.
- "Casaldáliga Case Begs Question: Who in Rome Muzzles Bishops?" National Catholic Reporter (Oct. 7, 1988), pp. 1, 4.
- "The Papal Spiderweb: Opus Dei & The 'Perfect Society.'" The Nation, vol. 248, no. 14 (Apr. 10, 1989), pp. 469, 482–487.
- "Who Knows? The Knights of Malta Know." National Catholic Reporter (May 5, 1989)
- "A Society Torn Apart by Violence." The Nation (Nov. 7, 1997), pp. 512–514

=== Book reviews ===
- "Isle of the Damned." Review of Written in Blood, by Robert Debs Heinl Jr. and Nancy Gordon Heinl. Inquiry (Feb. 19, 1979), pp. 27–29.
