= Marcella Althaus-Reid =

Argentine feminist theologian (1952–2009)

Marcella Maria Althaus-Reid
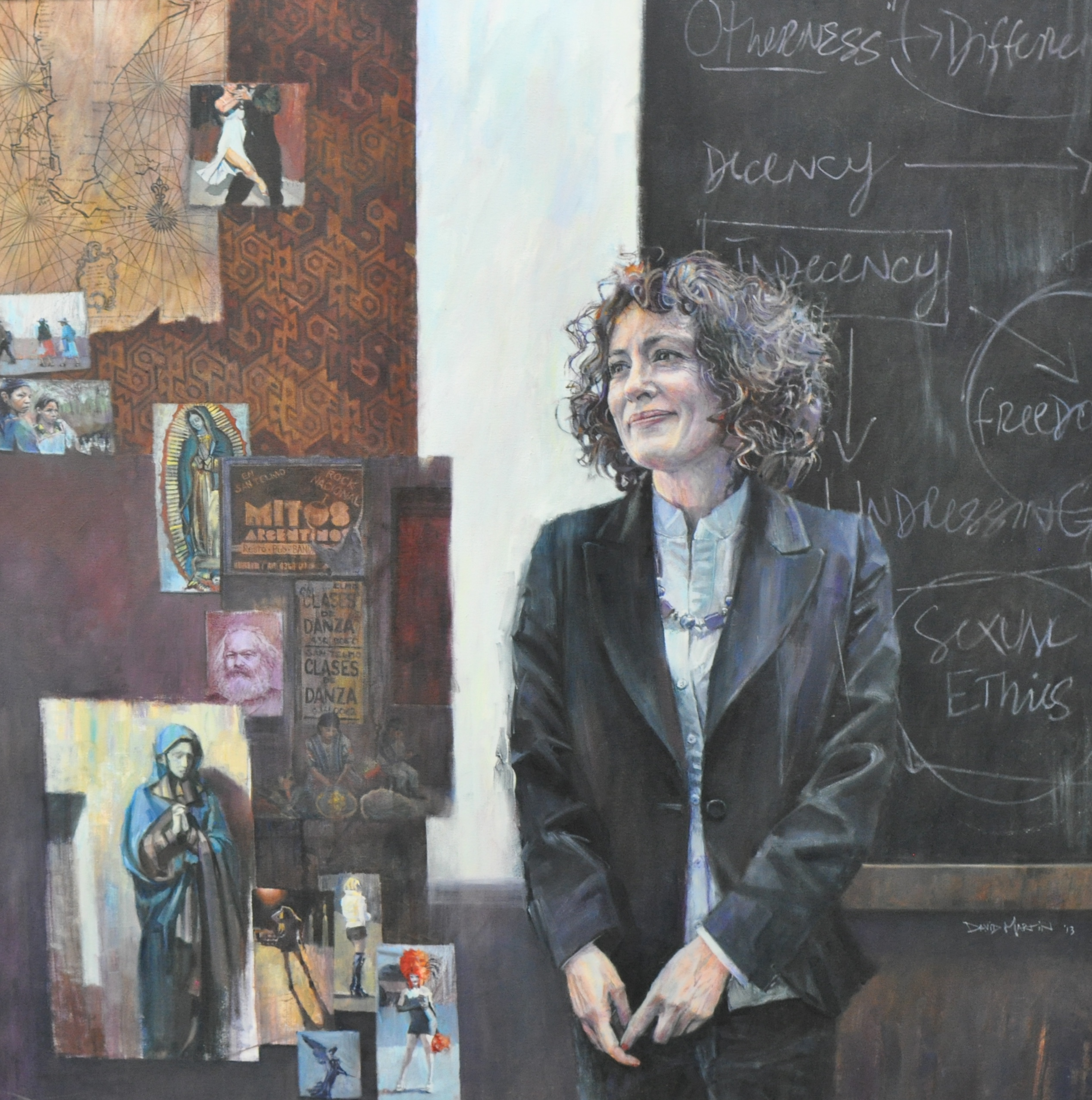
- Born: 11 May 1952; Rosario, Santa Fe, Argentina
- Died: 20 February 2009 (aged 56); Edinburgh, Scotland
- Occupation: Contextual theologian
- Known for: Liberation theology, Feminist theology, Queer theology

Marcella Maria Althaus-Reid (11 May 1952 – 20 February 2009) was an Argentine-Scottish Professor of Contextual Theology at New College, the University of Edinburgh. When appointed, she was the only female professor of theology at a Scottish university and the first female professor of theology at New College in its 160-year history. She was a speaker and author on liberation theology, feminist theology and queer theology.

== Early life ==
Marcella Maria Althaus was born on 11 May 1952 in Rosario, province of Santa Fe, Argentina to Ada and Alberto Althaus. She grew up in Buenos Aires. She was a member of the Evangelical Methodist Church of Argentina, who sponsored her to study at the Instituto Superior Evangélico de Estudios Teológicos (ISEDET), an ecumenical theological institution in Buenos Aires. She studied with liberation theologians including Jose Miguez Bonino and Jose Severino Croatto. She graduated with a BA in Theology.

She joined a programme for young religious leaders in Norway, where she met Gordon Reid, from Scotland. They married and she moved with Reid to Dundee.

== Career ==
Althaus-Reid followed the methods of Paulo Freire, undertaking community and social projects supported by the church in disadvantaged neighborhoods of Buenos Aires. On moving to Scotland, she worked in disadvantaged neighborhoods of Dundee and Perth, coordinating projects inspired by the liberationist pedagogy of Freire.

She completed her doctorate in 1993 at the University of St Andrews, Scotland, writing her doctoral thesis on the influence of Paul Ricoeur in the methodology of liberation theology. In 1994, she was appointed as a lecturer in Christian Ethics and Practical Theology and to direct a masters in theology and development at New College, University of Edinburgh. She was promoted to senior lecturer, reader, then in 2006, professor of Contextual Theology.

== Thought ==
Althaus-Reid is perhaps best known for her 2002 work in Indecent Theology, in which she challenged feminists in her use of sexual and explicit language. She argued sex has been constructed by a patriarchal worldview which underpins many of the great atrocities of the world. Hence, the virginity of the Virgin Mary needs to be "indecented" as it hides the lives of many poor women who, she describes, as rarely being virgins.

She also speaks about an "indecent Christ," whereby a kenotic Christology speaks of God self-emptying and being embodied in Christ and human sexuality. She explains that "[Jesus] has been dressed theologically as a heterosexually oriented (celibate) man. Jesus with erased genitalia; Jesus minus erotic body." Instead, she speaks about the bi-sexuality of Christ as an inclusive understanding of the incarnation. She wants to argue for a larger Christology which recasts Jesus in postmodern sexualities, genders, and economic locations. This is a critique she had against Latin American liberation theology, which she understood as failing to address questions of gender and sexuality alongside the question of conquest and colonization of the Americas.

== Works ==
- Marcella Althaus-Reid (2002). Indecent Theology. New York: Routledge. ISBN 978-1-134-56255-8.
- Marcella Althaus-Reid (2004). The Queer God. New York: Routledge. ISBN 1-134-35010-4.
- Marcella Althaus-Reid (2004). From Feminist Theology to Indecent Theology: Readings on Poverty, Sexual Identity and God. London: SCM Press. ISBN 978-0-334-04299-0.
- Marcella Althaus-Reid; Lisa Isherwood, eds. (2004). The Sexual Theologian: Essays on Sex, God and Politics. London: T&T Clark. ISBN 978-0-567-08212-1.
- Marcella Althaus-Reid (2005). "From Liberation Theology to Indecent Theology: The Trouble with Normality in Theology". In Ivan Petrella (ed.). Latin American Liberation Theology: The Next Generation. Maryknoll, NY: Orbis Books. pp. 20–38. ISBN 978-1-57075-595-8.

== Later life and death ==
In the last years of her life, Althaus-Reid worked with the Argentine theologian Ivan Petrella to publicize liberation theology in the English-speaking world. She was also associate editor of the journal Studies in World Christianity and a member of the editorial board of the journal Concilium. She was Director of the International Association for Queer Theology, Director of the Queer Theology Project at the University of Edinburgh, and a member of the Metropolitan Community Church.

Althaus-Reid died on 20 February 2009 in Edinburgh, Scotland, where she had lived since 1986.

== See also ==
- Feminist theology
- Liberation theology
- Paulo Freire
- Queer theology
