= Mary Ellsberg =

American epidemiologist

- Born: 1958 (age 67–68)
- Education: Yale University; Umeå University
- Known for: Studying violence against women
- Spouse: Michael Levi
- Children: 2
- Scientific career
- Fields: Epidemiology, global health
- Workplaces: George Washington University
- Thesis: Candies in Hell: Research and Action On Domestic Violence Against Women in Nicaragua (2000)

Mary Carroll Ellsberg (born 1958) is an American epidemiologist whose research focuses on global health and violence against women. She is the director of the Global Women's Institute at George Washington University in Washington D.C. Ellsberg is the daughter of Carol Cummings and the American military analyst and whistleblower, Daniel Ellsberg, and sister to Robert Ellsberg, the editor-in-chief and publisher of Orbis Books, and author Michael Ellsberg.

== Education ==
Ellsberg received her bachelor's degree in Latin American studies from Yale University. In 2000, she obtained her Ph.D. in epidemiology and public health from Umeå University in Sweden, where she wrote a thesis on domestic violence against women in Nicaragua.

== Nicaragua ==
In 1979 Ellsberg moved to Nicaragua to work for peace and social justice, and she lived there for almost 20 years. During this time she participated in the Nicaraguan Literacy Campaign and worked with vaccination and health consultation programs on the Caribbean coast for the Nicaragua Department of Health. Subsequently, in 1995 she did a prevalence study on domestic violence in Nicaragua, finding that 50% of women had been beaten or raped by their partner. This study was used to pass the country's first domestic violence law in 1996. In 2000, she defended her Ph.D. thesis at Umeå University on domestic violence in Nicaragua. After moving back to the United States, she has continued to conduct domestic violence research in Nicaragua.

== United States ==
After returning to the United States, Ellsberg served as the vice president for research and programs at the International Center for Research on Women in Washington D.C. In 2012 she joined the faculty of George Washington University where she is the director of the Global Women's Institute.

== Scientific research ==
Ellsberg has studied domestic violence against women around the world, including Nicaragua, Melanesia, and South Sudan. She was a member of the core research team of the World Health Organization's Multi-Country Study on Domestic Violence and Women's Health, which compared ten countries in terms of prevalence, risk factors and consequences of intimate partner violence.

== Selected publications ==
- 1999 Domestic violence and emotional distress among Nicaraguan women: Results from a population-based study, Ellsberg M, Caldera T, Herrera A, Winkvist A, Kullgren G.
- 1999 Wife abuse among women of childbearing age in Nicaragua, Ellsberg MC, Pena R, Herrera A, Liljestrand J, Winkvist A.
- 2000 Candies in hell: women's experiences of violence in Nicaragua. Social science & medicine, Ellsberg M, Peña R, Herrera A, Liljestrand J, Winkvist A.
- 2001 Researching domestic violence against women: methodological and ethical considerations, Ellsberg M, Heise L, Pena R, Agurto S, Winkvist A.
- 2006 Prevalence of intimate partner violence: findings from the WHO multi-country study on women's health and domestic violence, Garcia-Moreno C, Jansen HA, Ellsberg M, Heise L, Watts CH.
- 2008 Intimate partner violence and women's physical and mental health in the WHO multi-country study on women's health and domestic violence: an observational study, Ellsberg M, Jansen HA, Heise L, Watts CH, Garcia-Moreno C.
- 2011 What factors are associated with recent intimate partner violence? Findings from the WHO multi-country study on women's health and domestic violence, Abramsky T, Watts CH, Garcia-Moreno C, Devries K, Kiss L, Ellsberg M, Jansen HA, Heise L.
- 2015 Prevention of violence against women and girls: what does the evidence say? Ellsberg M, Arango DJ, Morton M, Gennari F, Kiplesund S, Contreras M, Watts C.
- 2017 No safe place: A lifetime of violence for conflict-affected women and girls in South Sudan, Global Women's Institute, Ellsberg M, Contreras M.
- 2020 Long-term change in the prevalence of intimate partner violence: a 20-year follow-up study in León, Nicaragua, 1995–2016, Ellsberg M, Ugarte W, Ovince J, et al.
