= Michael Ellsberg =

American author, blogger, and public speaker (born 1977)

- Born: May 12, 1977 (age 49); San Francisco, California, US
- Education: Brown University
- Occupations: Author, journalist
- Spouse: Jena la Flamme (2010–2014)
- Writing career
- Genres: Nonfiction
- Notable work: The Education of Millionaires

Michael Ellsberg (born May 12, 1977) is an American author, blogger, and public speaker. In 2011, he published The Education of Millionaires: It's Not What You Think and It's Not Too Late.

== Personal life ==
Ellsberg was born in San Francisco to Daniel Ellsberg, who was from a family of Ashkenazi Jewish origin, and Patricia Marx Ellsberg, the daughter of American toy maker Louis Marx. He is the younger half-brother of author and publisher Robert Ellsberg and epidemiologist Mary Ellsberg. He grew up in Berkeley, and attended Deerfield Academy. He received a degree in International Relations from Brown University in 1999. Ellsberg was married to Jena la Flamme, but the couple divorced in 2014.

== Writing career ==
Ellsberg has written about the power of body language. His first book, The Power of Eye Contact: Your Secret for Success in Business, Love, and Life, was published in 2010. His second book, The Education of Millionaires: It’s Not What You Think and It’s Not Too Late, was published in 2011. For this book, Ellsberg interviewed millionaires and billionaires who do not have college degrees (including Matt Mullenweg, Pink Floyd’s David Gilmour, Sean Parker, and Marc Ecko). The book was profiled in Time Magazine, who called the book an "assault on higher education", and in the New York Times.

Ellsberg also writes for Forbes.

== Other projects ==
Ellsberg is credited for inventing "eye-gazing parties," a craze in 2010 where participants stare deeply into each other's eyes and follow up if they feel they made a connection. He is also a book editor and has spoken at Google and Peter Thiel's Fellow Retreat.

Ellsberg has written about men's role in the #MeToo movement. He claims to have "been that guy" before, and encourages men to reflect on examples of boorish sexual behavior, such as the viral Cat Person story, which is written from the perspective of a twenty-year-old woman who goes on a date with a much older man and ends up having an unpleasant sexual experience that was consensual but unwanted. Ellsberg has asked men to pledge to get a verbal or nonverbal yes before initiating any sexual encounter, and to slow down if there's ever doubt the other person wants to continue.

== Bibliography ==
- Ellsberg, Michael (2010). The Power of Eye Contact: Your Secret for Success in Business, Love, and Life. Harper Paperbacks. p. 272. ISBN 978-0-06-178221-3.
- Ellsberg, Michael (2011). The Education of Millionaires: It's Not What You Think and It's Not Too Late. Portfolio Hardcover. p. 272. ISBN 978-1-59184-420-4.
