= Franz Hinkelammert =

German-born Costa Rican liberation theologian (1931–2023)

Franz Josef Hinkelammert
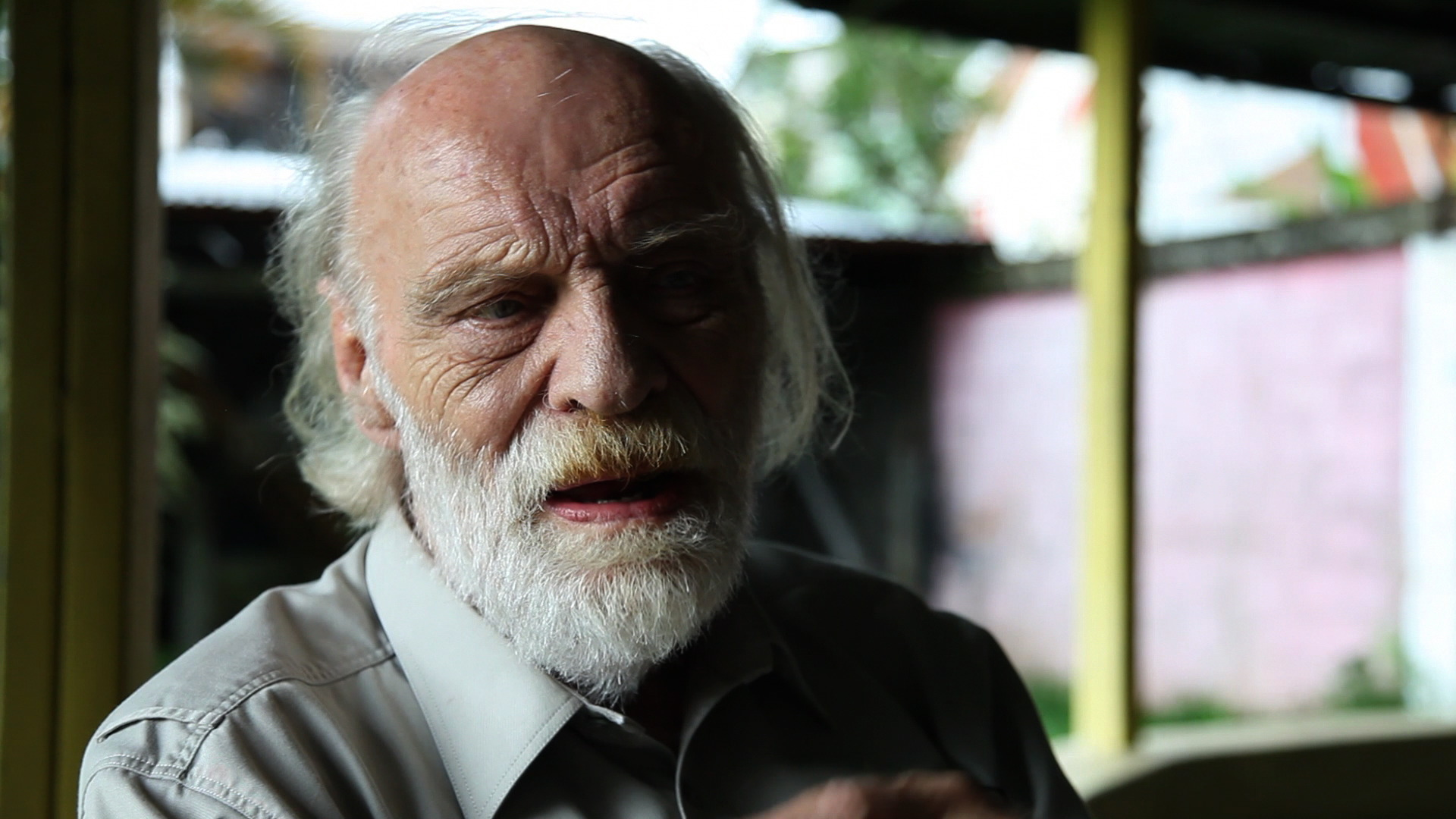
- Hinkelammert in 2012
- Born: 12 January 1931; Emsdetten, Westphalia, Prussia, Germany
- Died: 16 July 2023 (aged 92); San José, Costa Rica
- Education: Free University of Berlin

Franz Josef Hinkelammert (12 January 1931 – 16 July 2023) was a German-born Costa Rican theologian and economist, an influential theorist of liberation theology who wrote theological critiques of capitalism. He was one of the co-founders of the influential Departamento Ecuménico de Investigaciones in Sabanilla, Costa Rica, along with Hugo Assmann and Pablo Richard.

Franz Hinkelammert was born on 12 January 1931. He held a doctorate in economics from the Free University of Berlin. He served on the faculty of the Catholic University of Chile from 1963 to 1973.

After the Pinochet coup, he went to the Departmento Ecuménico de Investigaciones in Sabanilla, Costa Rica. He wrote extensively and critically about the neoliberal economic model, anti-utopian and anti-socialist views within religion and politics as well as the syncretism of Marxism and Christianity. His criticisms include those of the economists Milton Friedman, Friedrich Hayek as well as the philosopher Karl Popper.

In 2012 Jim Finn made a portrait documentary called Sunday School with Franz Hinkelammert.

Franz Hinkelammert died on 16 July 2023, at the age of 92.

== Sources ==
- Hinkelammert, F., The Ideological Weapons of Death: A Theological Critique of Capitalism, translated by Phillip Berryman with an introduction by Cornel West, 1986.
- Hinkelammert, F., Crítica de la Razón Utópica, 1983.
- Duchrow, I. and Hinkelammert, F., Property for People, Not for Profit: Alternatives to the Global Tyranny of Capital, 2004
- Sunday School with Franz Hinkelammert
