= Phillip Berryman =

American Catholic author and professor (born 1938)

Phillip E. Berryman (born 1938) is an American author of several books on both liberation theology and the Christian experience in Latin America. After his ordination as a Roman Catholic priest in 1963, he spent two years at a church in Pasadena, California, before working in pastoral ministry in the Panama City barrio of El Chorrillo from 1965–1973.

That year, he left the priesthood and married. He later worked with the American Friends Service Committee, living in Guatemala but traveling throughout Central America. He returned to the United States in 1980 and began writing the next year. He is a professor of Latin American Studies at Temple University. He now lives in Philadelphia with his wife, Angela, with whom he has three children: Catherine, Maggie and Lizzy.

== Selected publications ==
- Berryman, Phillip (2005). "The Bush Doctrine: A Catholic Critique." In America Magazine. The National Catholic Weekly.America Magazine
- Comblin, J. & Berryman, P. (2004). People of God. Orbis Books. ISBN 1-57075-521-3
- Berryman, Phillip (1996). Religion in the Megacity: Catholic and Protestant Portraits from Latin America. Orbis Books. ISBN 1-57075-083-1.
- Berryman, Phillip (1995). Stubborn Hope: Religion, Politics, and Revolution in Central America. New Press. ISBN 1-56584-137-9
- Berryman, Phillip (1987). Liberation Theology: Essential Facts About the Revolutionary Movement in Latin America - and Beyond. Meyer Stone Books. ISBN 0-940989-03-4
- Berryman, Phillip (1984). The Religious Roots of Rebellion: Christians in Central American Revolutions. Orbis Books. ISBN 0-88344-105-5
- Hinkelammert, Franz (1986). The Ideological Weapons of Death: A Theological Critique of Capitalism, translated by Phillip Berryman, Orbis Books.
- Berryman, Phillip (2019) Memento of the Living and the Dead: A First-Person Account of Church, Violence, and Resistance in Latin America. Resource Publications ISBN 978-1-5326-9088-4
- https://books.google.com/books?id=UEBq1LfB5loC&pg=PT221

== See also ==
- Subsidiarity (Catholicism)
