= Robert Ellsberg =

American religious publisher and author (born 1955)

- Born: 1955 (age 70–71)
- Education: Harvard College; Harvard Divinity School
- Occupation: Publisher
- Employer: Orbis Books
- Spouse: Monica Olson
- Children: 3
- Parent(s): Daniel Ellsberg; Carol Cummings
- Relatives: Mary Ellsberg (sister); Michael Ellsberg (half-brother)

Signature
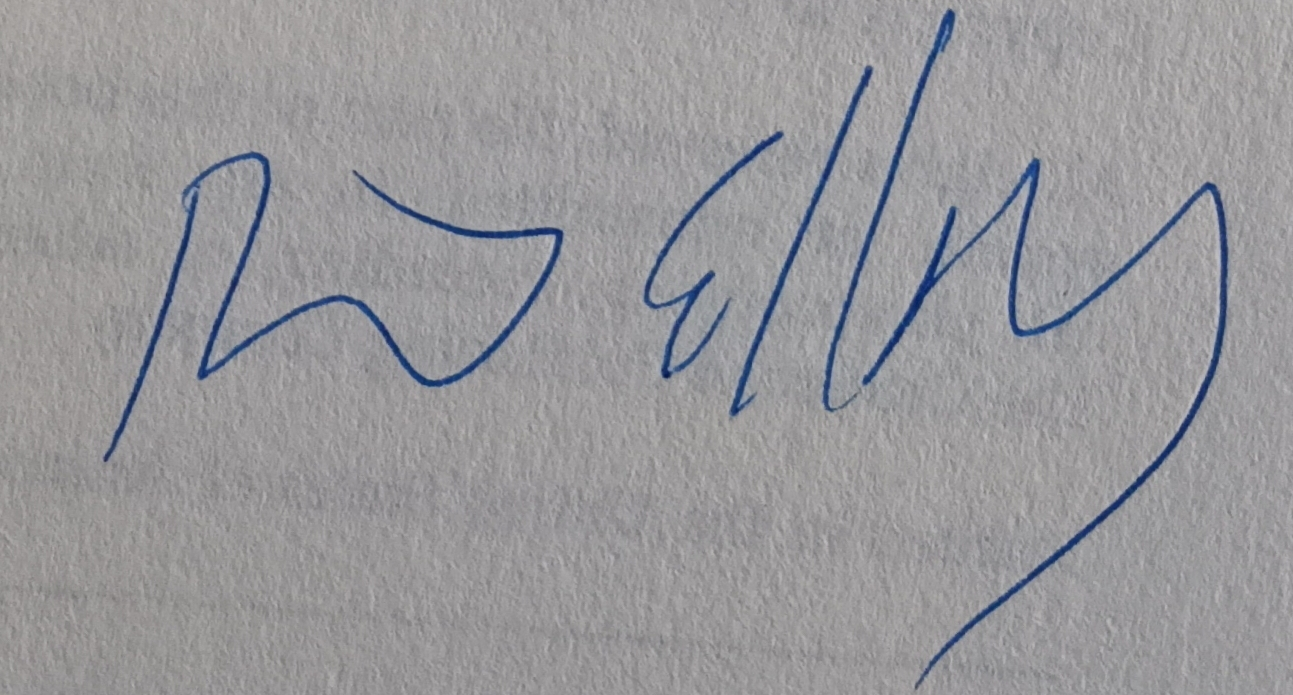

Robert Ellsberg (born 1955) is an American religious publisher and author who is the editor-in-chief and publisher of Orbis Books, the publishing arm of Maryknoll.

== Early life ==
Robert Ellsberg is the son of Carol Cummings, the daughter of a Marine Corps Brigadier General, and the American military analyst and whistleblower Daniel Ellsberg. He is the older brother of epidemiologist Mary Ellsberg, and the half-brother of author Michael Ellsberg. He was raised Episcopalian, although his father's family was originally Jewish.

After his parents' divorce, Robert lived with his mother and sister in Los Angeles. In October 1969, at Daniel Ellsberg's request, thirteen-year-old Robert and his sister helped their father photocopy pages of the Pentagon Papers, in an effort to teach them "the importance of following one's conscience".

Robert Ellsberg spent his senior year in high school as an exchange student in England.

== Career ==
In 1975, at age 19, Ellsberg dropped out of Harvard, intending to spend a few months with the Catholic Worker Movement in New York City. He stayed to become the managing editor of The Catholic Worker for two years (1976–78), a job where he met Dorothy Day, with whom he worked for the last five years of her life.

In 1978 Robert Ellsberg and his father Daniel were arrested while protesting outside the Rocky Flats Plant, a nuclear weapon manufacturing complex in Colorado. He was received into the Catholic Church in 1980. That year, Ellsberg returned to Harvard, and earned a degree in religion and literature, and later a Master's in Theology from Harvard Divinity School.

In 1984, Ellsberg's book By Little and By Little won a Christopher Award.

In 1987, Ellsberg began work as editor-in-chief of Orbis Books. He is the author of several books, many of which have received awards. His Blessed Among All Women tied a Catholic Press Association record by winning awards for Gender, Spirituality, and Popular Presentation of the Catholic Faith. He is the editor of the published diaries and letters of Dorothy Day. Ellsberg also helped complete Penny Lernoux's final book, Hearts on Fire: The Story of the Maryknoll Sisters, which was published in 1993.

Ellsberg has written a number of articles for the Jesuit Review, America, the National Catholic Reporter, and Maryknoll Magazine. Around 2015, he was contacted by art historian Sister Wendy Beckett, who was looking for a particular series of books on Vatican II. Through their shared interests in saints, they continued to correspond regularly by email until her death in 2018.

== Books ==
- Gandhi on Christianity (1991)
- All Saints: Daily Reflections on Saints, Prophets, and Witnesses for Our Time (Crossroad, 1997)
- The Saints' Guide to Happiness: Practical Lessons in the Life of the Spirit, Doubleday, 2005. ISBN 978-0-385-51566-5
- Blessed Among All Women: Reflections on Women Saints, Prophets, and Witnesses for Our Time (Crossroad, 2006).
- The Duty Of Delight: The Diaries of Dorothy Day. ISBN 0-87462-023-6 (editor) Marquette University Press, Milwaukee, 2008
- All the Way to Heaven: The Selected Letters of Dorothy Day. ISBN 978-0-87462-061-0 (editor) Marquette University Press, Milwaukee, 2010.
- Blessed Among Us: Day by Day with Saintly Witnesses. ISBN 9780814647219 (Liturgical Press, 2016)
