= John Parratt =

English cricketer

John Parratt (24 March 1859 – 6 May 1905) was an English first-class cricketer, who played two matches for Yorkshire County Cricket Club between 1888 and 1890.

Born in Morley, Yorkshire, Parratt made his Yorkshire County Championship debut against Gloucestershire, at the Clifton College Close Ground in 1888. He scored 11 before being bowled by William Woof; and bowled nine overs for 12 and twenty two overs for 51 in a drawn game. His last match was against Liverpool and District in 1890. He did not bat in the first innings, being absent hurt and scored a duck in the second, but bowled ten overs and took the wicket of Henry Grayson for 12, as Yorkshire ran out winners by 73 runs.

He was a useful all-rounder who was engaged by Leeds St. Johns C.C. in 1890, plus at Selkirk C.C., Werneth C.C. in 1887 and 1888, and he played for Morley C.C. in 1900 and 1901. Parratt became landlord of the Royal Oak pub in Morley.

Parratt died in Morley in May 1905.
