= Ivan Petrella =

Argentine social theorist and liberation theologian (born 1969)

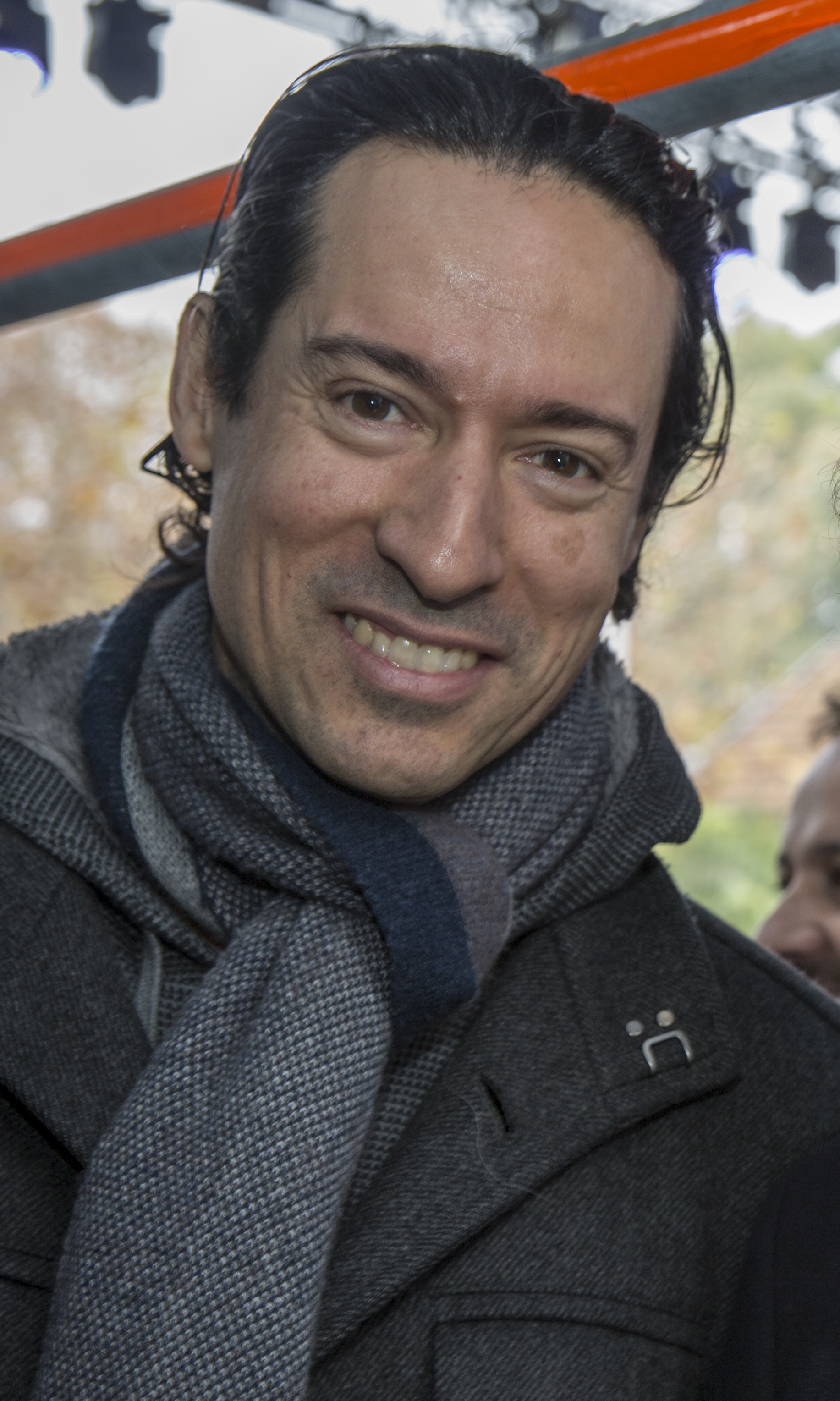
- Ivan Petrella
- Born: November 8, 1968 (age 57)
- Occupation: Educator

Ivan Petrella (born November 8, 1969) is an Argentine social theorist and liberation theologian. He is the Secretary of Culture in Argentina's Ministry of Culture and currently teaches at Universidad Torcuato Di Tella in Buenos Aires, Argentina. He was an associate professor in the Department of Religious Studies at the University of Miami in Coral Gables, Florida, and co-executive editor of the Reclaiming Liberation Theology book series with SCM Press.

== Education ==
Petrella holds a bachelor's degree from Georgetown University's School of Foreign Service, a Masters of Theological Studies from Harvard Divinity School and a Ph.D. in Religion and Law from Harvard University's Committee on the Study of Religion in the Graduate School of Arts and Sciences.

== Theological views ==
As an Argentine liberation theologian that is also agnostic, Petrella's scholarship cuts across religious studies departments and divinity schools, the United States and Latin America, and theology and the social sciences. Historian Mario Aguilar notes that his work represents different things for different people: he may seem to Argentines a theologian, but to Americans, he may be considered a scholar of religion.

Petrella is particularly interested in the intersections between different liberation theologies including black theology, Latin American liberation theology, Womanist theology and Hispanic/Latino(a) theology. He criticises disciplines like economics, political science, and law, which he believes sometimes operate in favour of the wealthy, and that they need a transformation to more closely align with the values of liberation theology.

== Public services ==
He is the Secretary of Culture in Argentina's Ministry of Culture. Previously he was an elected representative in the City of Buenos Aires state legislature.

== Selected bibliography ==
- Petrella, Ivan (2005). Latin American Liberation Theology: The Next Generation. Maryknoll, NY: Orbis Books (Held in over 200 libraries according to WorldCat).
- Petrella, Ivan (2006). The Future of Liberation Theology: An Argument and Manifesto. London: SCM Press. (Held in over 375 libraries according to WorldCat
- Petrella, Ivan (2007). Theology for Another Possible World. London: SCM Press.
  - review: Theology. no. 856, (2007): 299
  - review : Journal of the American Academy of Religion, 75, no. 1 (2007): 223-227
- Petrella, Ivan (2008). Beyond Liberation Theology: A Polemic. London: SCM Press. ISBN 9780334041344

=== Further reading ===
- Book Review of The Future of Liberation Theology by Alistair Kee
