= Baltimore Four =

1967 civil disobedience in Baltimore, Maryland, US

The Baltimore Four were four Catholic peace activists who poured blood on draft files at the Baltimore Customs House to protest the Vietnam War on October 17, 1967. This action was the immediate predecessor to and direct inspiration for The Catonsville Nine, both of which were led by Roman Catholic priest and peace activist Philip Berrigan.

The Four were (alphabetically):

- Father Philip Berrigan, 44 a Josephite priest from St. Peter Claver, a majority-Black Catholic church in Baltimore
- David Eberhardt, 26, a poet and peace activist, secretary of the Baltimore Interfaith Peace Mission
- Tom Lewis, 27, an artist and peace activist
- Rev. James L. Mengel III, 38, a US Air Force veteran and United Church of Christ minister

== Custom House Raid ==
The four men raided the Baltimore City Custom House and poured blood on draft records. They did this to protest the involuntary drafting of civilian young men in the Vietnam War. Pouring blood was Berrigan's idea, later saying he was protesting "the pitiful waste of American and Vietnamese blood in Indochina." Tom Lewis told oral historian Rosalie Riegle that the blood dripping from draft files was meant to symbolize the blood on both sides of the conflict in Vietnam. He called it "a Biblical symbol and a healing symbol." Mengel donated blood, but he chose not to pour it. Instead he gave out copies of the New Testament. Eberhardt also joined Mengel in handing out religious literature, and a clerk testified at their trial that she crumpled up the pamphlets and threw them back in the two mens' faces. They published a statement on their action in the Catholic Peace Fellowship Bulletin, explaining that they chose an inner-city draft board because "America would rather protect its empire of overseas profits than welcome its black people, rebuild its slums and cleanse its air and water." They also called Vietnam "a rich man's war and a poor man's fight," echoing future charges that even after the US eliminated the draft, it retained an "economic draft" by conscripting lower-income recruits who needed the money, the training, and the job benefits, and who could not afford to evade service.

Jonah House, an activist peace community and training ground which Berrigan co-founded in the early 1970s, thinks the group may have been inspired by Barry Bondhus, a Minnesota peace activist who poured buckets of liquefied human waste on Selective Service files in February 1966.

== Aftermath and trial ==
While the four were out on bond, Berrigan invited Eberhardt to participate in The Catonsville Nine, but Eberhardt declined because of his bond status. So did Jesuit priest and Georgetown University professor Richard McSorley SJ. who always said he regretted that decision. Eventually Eberhardt did join Berrigan in breaking bond and going underground, however, along with George Mische and Mary Moylan of The Catonsville Nine. Berrigan and Eberhardt publicly announced a rally in Manhattan at St. Gregory the Great Church that they titled "Up from Under." Earlier that day they were hiding in a priests' closet rectory when the FBI raided the building and found them. They had publicly announced an appearance that evening, but the FBI timed the raid to pre-empt the public event.

When Martin Luther King Jr. was assassinated and riots followed, the trial of the Baltimore Four had to be postponed. George Mische had been coming to every day of the trial, and staying throughout, and the trial gave him an idea. Writes Maggie Astor of The New York Times,

When a defense lawyer for the four asked why the government didn’t simply go into the Selective Service archives for duplicates of the files that had been covered with blood, an officer responded that there were no duplicates. Pressed by the defense, he acknowledged that if, for example, a draft file were burned, its subject would no longer exist in the eyes of the Selective Service. In the gallery, Mr. Mische recalled, he turned to his wife and said, 'We’re going to burn the goddamn things.'

That was the origin of the Catonsville Nine decision to burn draft cards on a bonfire they started in the parking lot of the Selective Service office.

The Baltimore Four inspired subsequent actions, including most directly The Catonsville Nine, but also the Milwaukee 14, the D.C. Nine, the Silver Spring Three, the Chicago Eight, the Harrisburg Seven, and the Camden 28. Gradually the actions gave way to those of the closely related Plowshares movement, also led by Phil Berrigan and to a lesser extent his brother Dan. Both the Baltimore Four and the Catonsville Nine are featured in the 2013 documentary Hit & Stay.
