= Chicago 15 (protest group) =

Group of American antiwar activists

The Chicago 15 were a group of 15 American antiwar activists known for protesting the U.S. war with Vietnam. On Sunday, May 25, 1969 the group broke into the Selective Service office at 2355 W. 63rd Street in Chicago, which housed the records of 34 south side draft boards. They removed 40,000 records, stuffing the documents into burlap bags and dragging the bags outside to the alley where they doused the records in gasoline and set them ablaze. The 15 men and women stood singing songs around the bonfire until police arrested and transferred them to Cook County Jail.

== Members ==
Members of the Chicago 15 and their ages at the time were:

- Fred Chase, 25
- Bill Durkin, 19
- Ed Gargan, 18
- Margaret Katroscik, 22
- John Loll, 20
- Joe Mulligan, S.J., 25
- Charlie Muse, 21
- Ed Hoffmans, 31
- Chuck Fullenkamp, 23
- John Phillips, 25
- Fr. John Pietra, 33
- Linda Quint, 22
- Fr. Nick Riddell, 39
- Tom Smit, 25
- Bill Sweeney, 19.

== Charges and trial ==
The group's members were initially charged with burglary and arson. A federal grand jury would later indict them on four counts: destruction of government property, mutilation of official records, interfering with the Selective Service System, and conspiracy to do these things. Their trial began May 4, 1970. Eleven members of the group were arrested and brought to trial; four went on the run to avoid arrest. In June of 1970 ten of the eleven tried at trial were convicted. Members served prison terms up to two years for what was the largest and last act of draft record destruction during the American war with Vietnam in which the activists waited at the scene to be arrested in civil disobedience. Their action followed and was partly inspired by a similar act of civil disobedience by Philip and Daniel Berrigan and other members of the Baltimore Four.

== See also ==
- Catonsville 9 (1968)
- Milwaukee Fourteen (1968)
- Chicago Seven (1968)
