= David Eberhardt =

American peace activist

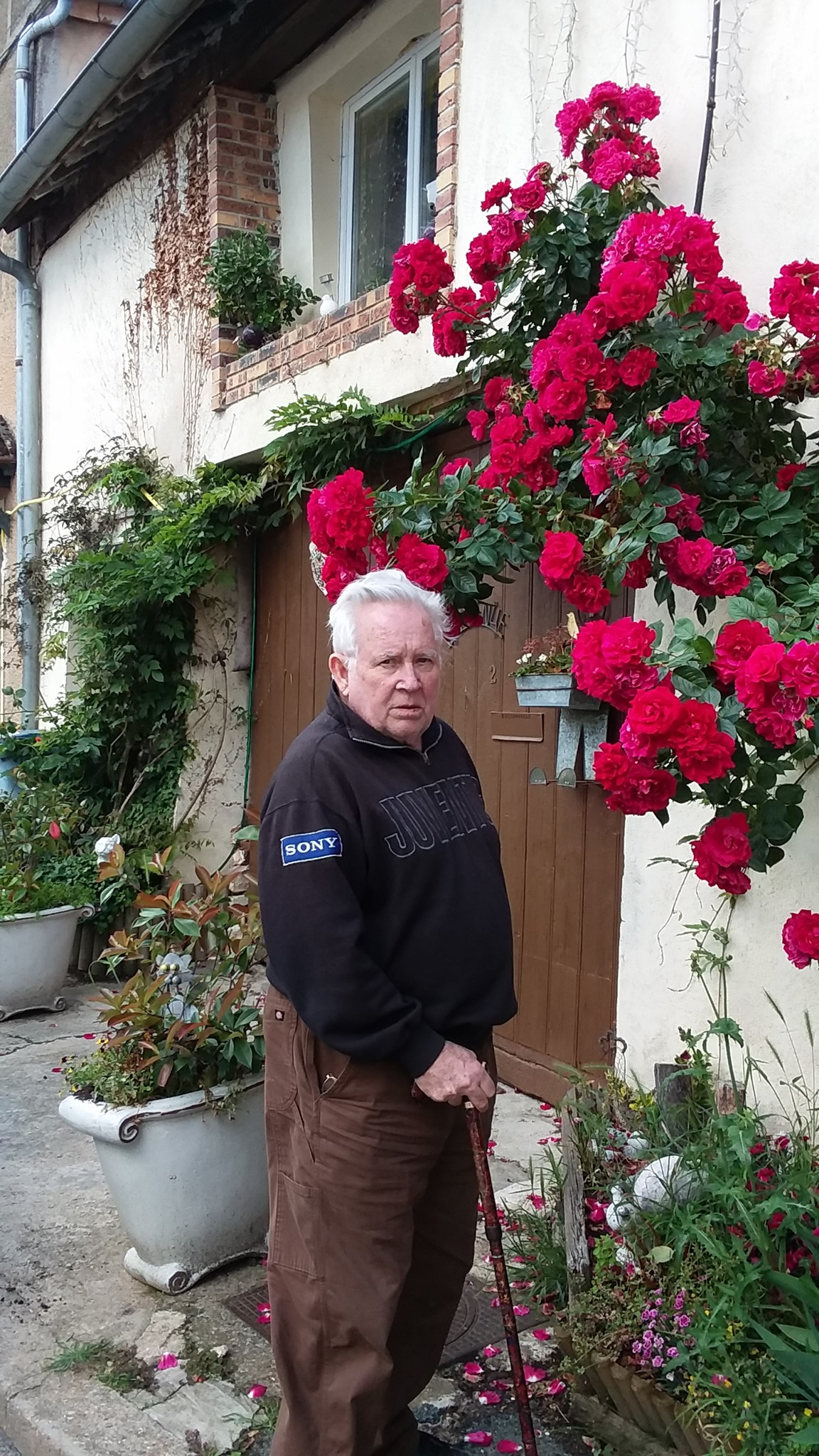
- Born: March 26, 1941 (age 85); Teaneck, New Jersey, United States
- Education: Oberlin College
- Occupations: Poet, musician, author, peace activist
- Known for: The Baltimore Four
- Children: 1, Christopher

David Mack Eberhardt (born March 26, 1941), is an American peace activist and poet. He is best known for his participation, with Philip Berrigan and two others, in the antiwar action known as the Baltimore Four, an immediate precursor to the Catonsville Nine.

== Early life ==
His father, Charles R. Eberhardt, S.T.M., Ph.D., was an Episcopal minister, as well as chair of the Department of Philosophy at Towson State University, and earlier a professor at Davidson College. His mother was one of the first teachers at the St. James Academy, part of the St. James Church (Monkton, Maryland). His father was author of the book The Bible in the Making of Ministers. He took after his mother, who was born a Mack (Scottish), and thus Mack was his middle name. The Macks landed in Lyme Connecticut in 1717 and went up the Connecticut River valley, some fighting in the revolutionary war. A book published in 1911 details a history of American Macks, "a stubborn lot," the preface says. Her father Silas Mack was an immigration judge in Monterey, California. On his mother's side Eberhardt is related to Joseph Smith, prophet-founder of the Church of Jesus Christ of Latter-Day Saints. Eberhardt is a graduate of Northfield Mount Hermon School (1958), and Oberlin College (1962). He played varsity lacrosse at both schools.

Although he grew up Episcopalian on what he called "the hard pews of the church," he does not practice it in adulthood, saying he comes closest spiritually to Zen and Sufism, and the Catholic Worker Movement.

His influences include the hymn Once to Every Man and Nation, based on a James Russell Lowell poem. He is also influenced by the Anglican processional hymn For All the Saints by Walsham How, making it the title of one of his books. He additionally cites the unofficial national anthem of England, "Jerusalem" (And did those feet in ancient time), a choral song by Sir Hubert Parry.

== Peace activism ==
He taught for several years at the Boys' Latin School of Maryland in Baltimore, then began a life of activism, first in the civil rights movement with Baltimore's renowned civil rights leader Walter P. Carter as a mentor. With CORE, the Congress of Racial Equality, he created a publication, with photographs by Carl X, called The Soul Book. Eberhardt began in the peace movement in 1964, and was a draft counselor for the American Friends Service Committee (AFSC). Father Philip Berrigan became Eberhardt's mentor as they engaged in more and more assertive actions against the Vietnam War. Father Berrigan celebrated Eberhardt's marriage to Louise Yolton on October 16, 1967, the night before the actions of The Baltimore Four.

== The Baltimore Four ==
As a peace protester, on October 17, 1967, Eberhardt entered the Selective Service Board at Baltimore's Customs House with Father Philip Berrigan, Tom Lewis, and a United Church of Christ pastor, Rev. James L. Mengel III, to protest the Vietnam War. They combined their own blood and poultry blood, pouring it over draft records. After Martin Luther King, Jr. was assassinated, there were riots in Baltimore and other cities, and the trial was postponed.

This action predated The Catonsville Nine by six months. While they were out on bond, Berrigan invited Eberhardt to participate in that action, but he declined, as did Jesuit priest Richard McSorley SJ. Eberhardt and Berrigan, along with Mary Moylan and George Mische of The Catonsville Nine, broke bond and went underground. None of them responded to prosecutor Stephen Sach's letter advising them to turn themselves in. The FBI captured Berrigan and Eberhardt on the Upper West Side of Manhattan on April 21, 1970, when they raided St. Gregory the Great Church's parish rectory and found them hidden in a pastoral closet. They had publicly announced an appearance that evening, but the FBI staged the raid to pre-empt the public event.

== Incarceration ==
After an appeal was denied by the Supreme Court of the United States, he was incarcerated at Lewisburg Federal Penitentiary in 1970 for 21 months. In prison he met Jimmy Hoffa, who told him, "You pacifists, [what do you know] about organizing and picket lines? Goddamn, you're never gonna get anywhere. You need fists and guns!" He also met mafia chieftains Tony Provenzano and Carmine Galante, who expressed the same sentiments.

== After prison ==
Eberhardt liked to joke that he was one of the few inmates who was actually "corrected" in the correctional system, in that it gave him a career in criminal justice. He worked at the Baltimore City Detention Center, (the jail), assisted at the beginning by then-warden Gordon Kamka and Charles Benton, Finance Director for Mayor William Donald Schaefer. At the jail he was Director of the Baltimore Offender Aid and Restoration (OAR), which he founded along with Marjorie Scott, Administrator of the Baltimore AFSC Office. One of OAR's notable projects was its Bail Fund, one of the first of its kind, designed to help reduce overcrowding and meet a federal overcrowding mandate. OAR's original mission was to match volunteers with inmates and to initiate criminal justice reforms. His title at the BCDC was Social Program Administrator, and he brought many groups to the jail, such as Narcotics Anonymous, Alcoholics Anonymous, yoga, writing classes, life skills classes, and more. After 33 years working for the city and then the state, he retired in 2010.

After prison he also worked along with George Mische of The Catonsville Nine as a newsletter editor for the National Coordinating Committee for Justice under Law on prison reform issues. He also worked for the National Moratorium on Prison Construction, sponsored by the Unitarian Universalist Service Committee along with Brian Willson, on alternatives to prison.

== Other peace actions ==
As Vice Chair of his CORE chapter, he was again arrested several times, once for trying to integrate the Chartley Apartment Complex. During the 1960s he was a journalist for several underground newspapers. He was military editor for 'Harry', which he began while in prison, and also 'Dragonseed'.

He never stopped getting arrested (although for less serious offenses), for example protests at the Pentagon and NRA headquarters. Along with peace movement work, he is active on gun control issues and Baltimore's gun violence. He assisted the Baltimore Non Violence Center and as well the SPARK's campaigns for a Workers Party.

== Pardon by President Reagan ==
On December 23, 1982, he received a full and unconditional pardon from President Ronald Reagan, although he quipped that Reaganites needed a pardon from him.
