= Mary Moylan =

Nurse-midwife and political activist

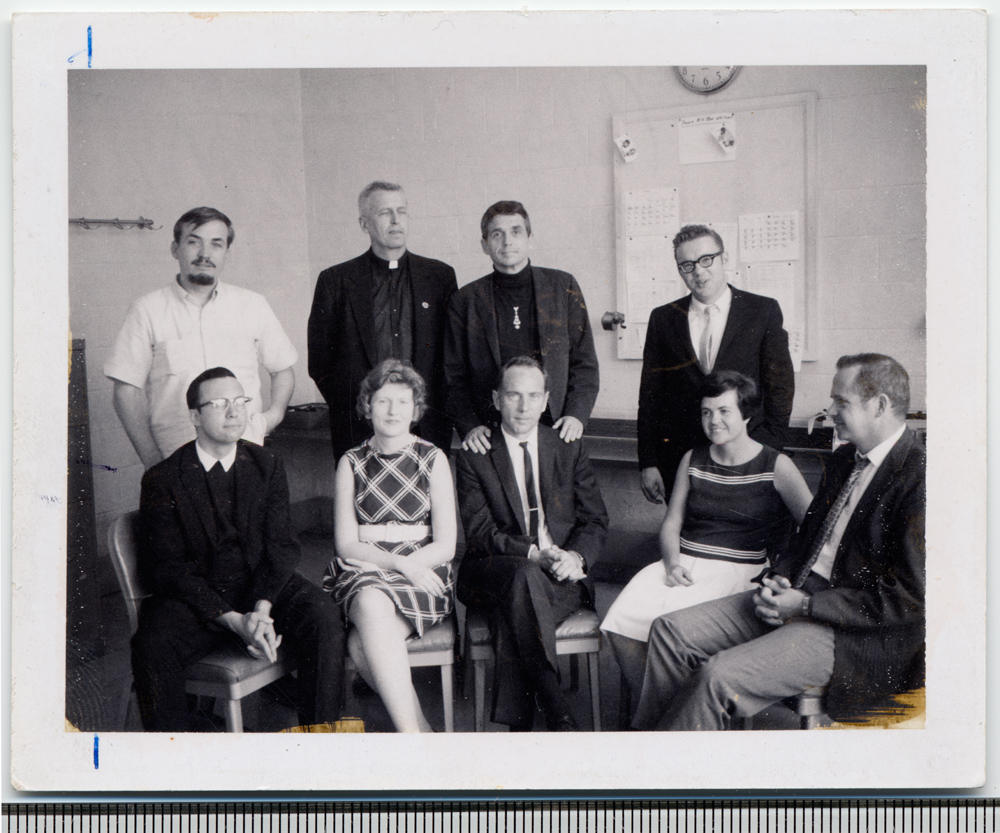
- Born: Mary Assumpta Moylan; August 15, 1936; Baltimore, Maryland, United States
- Died: April 14, 1995 (aged 58); Asbury Park, New Jersey, United States
- Education: Mercy Medical Center (Baltimore, Maryland) School of Nursing
- Occupations: Nurse, midwife, political activist
- Known for: The Catonsville Nine and other peace activism

Mary Moylan (August 15, 1936 – April, 1995) was a nurse-midwife and political activist, primarily known for her participation with the Catonsville Nine.

== Biography ==
Mary Assumpta Moylan was the daughter of Mary Moylan, a homemaker, and Joseph Moylan, a well-known and liked stenographer in Baltimore's criminal court and sometime employee of The Baltimore Sun, and a member of the Knights of Columbus. One of three children, she had a younger sister, Ella, and a brother. She was given the middle name Assumpta because she was born on the Feast of the Assumption of Mary.

Moylan graduated from Mount Saint Agnes College High School in Mount Washington (Baltimore), and then studied nursing at the Mercy Medical Center School of Nursing, becoming a registered nurse and certified nurse-midwife. Inspired when she heard a speech by Tom Dooley, she went to Uganda in 1959 with the White Sisters of Africa (Missionary Sisters of Our Lady of Africa) to work as a nurse midwife in a religious mission in Nkozi and later Fort Portal, also at one point teaching English in a secondary school. She did a second tour in Africa with the Women Volunteers Association. According to her friend, the scholar and theologian Rosemary Radford Ruether, she parted ways with the hospital in 1965 when she insisted on better training for the African personnel, including decision-making power. She remained in Uganda a few more months and then returned to Washington, DC, where she lived in an African missionary community run by the Archdiocese of Washington. She moved to a community at 1620 S Street NW, where she met George Mische, another of the Nine. Her commitment to Catholicism waned but her activism increased. Moylan was also influenced by the teachings of Georgetown University Jesuit priest Richard McSorley (who had been invited to join the Nine but declined, to his lasting regret), and liberation theologian priest and revolutionary Camilo Torres Restrepo.

=== Catonsville Nine ===
Moylan was one of two women on Catonsville Nine, the other being Marjorie Bradford Melville. They burned draft files with homemade napalm in the Knights of Columbus parking lot in Catonsville, Maryland. She and Melville flanked Tom Lewis and they entered first. She scuffled over a telephone with one of the clerks, Phyllis Morsberger, assuring her repeatedly "We won't hurt you" before relinquishing it, and walking away saying "It's all yours." Morsberger claimed years later that the group screamed at her and called them all murderers, but others dispute that story. To show how voluntary their arrest was, Moylan was able to slip out of the handcuffs easily because of her slender wrists, but she slipped them back on and allowed herself to be taken. In court she wore a tinkling bell on a chain one day, "a mere tinkle against the thudding gavel, a whispered plea against the insane clamor of war."

=== Years of exile ===
She participated in the trial, receiving bail of $5,000 and a sentence of two years, but did not report to prison. This triggered a national manhunt monitored by J. Edgar Hoover. She did not even attend her mother's funeral out of fear that the FBI would be waiting for her there. She described her life as one of nomadic poverty, often staying with friends and various women's communities. In part she went underground because, as she told a journalist, she wanted to prove a woman could do it, too. It was a pushback against what is still often seen as the "rampant clericalism and patriarchalism" of the whole Berrigan phenomenon and the narratives of what happened at actions. After friends appealed unsuccessfully to President Jimmy Carter to pardon her as he had Patty Hearst, she surrendered in Baltimore in June 1979, after which she served a year in the women's prison in Alderson, West Virginia. Afterward she returned to nursing, first at the People's Free Medical Clinic, eventually working in Queen Anne's Hospital. With Jim Keck she was a founder of the People's Community Health Center, that closed in 2015. She was also affiliated with secular radical antiwar groups, at was at the edges of SDS, RYMII and others though ultimately not aligning with them and instead embracing feminism over all else.

== Personal ==
She was portrayed by some friends as troubled because of her exile and the nature of her death, but George Mische objected to this image. Other friends remember her as argumentative, but a wit. Carl Schoettler of The Baltimore Sun reported that "Willa Bickham and Brendan Walsh, the couple who have devoted their lives to serving soup and love at their Viva House table, did keep in touch with Ms. Moylan during the years of her underground exile and afterward." In 2025, Viva House is part of the Baltimore Catholic Worker.

== Death ==
She was found dead in April 1995. It was unclear the exact day she died. Willa Bickham and Brendan Walsh of Viva House in Baltimore held a wake for her. She was said to have stayed at Viva House before going underground. George Mische wrote of her with deep respect, saying that sensationalist reports of her death were inaccurate and inappropriate.

== See also ==
- List of peace activists

== Sources ==
- du Plessix Gray, Francine (1973). Divine Disobedience: Profiles in Catholic Radicalism. New York: Alfred A. Knopf.
- Lynd, Straughton; & Lynd, Alice (Eds.) (1995). Nonviolence in America: A Documentary History. Maryknoll, NY: Orbis Books.
