= Silver Spring Three =

The Silver Spring Three refers to a Vietnam War era anti-draft action. On May 21, 1969, three young men walked into a Silver Spring, Maryland Selective Service office where they destroyed several hundred draft records to protest the war. Les Bayless (age 22), his brother Jon Bayless (age 17), and Michael Bransome (age 18) had been living at a commune known as Blair House (7421 Blair Road) just down the street from the draft board. Files were mutilated with blood and black paint, office equipment was destroyed, and the office was completely ransacked. The three waited for police and FBI agents to arrive and were arrested.

The Silver Spring Three were inspired by actions such as the Baltimore Four and the Catonsville Nine. At the time of the raid Les Bayless was out on bail for draft resistance. His trial was presided over by Judge Roszel Cathcart Thomsen (of the Catonsville Nine trial), who gave him a three-year sentence on top of his five-year sentence for draft evasion. Michael Bransome was sentenced to three years in federal prison, spent eight months when prior to a furlough to his home in D.C. he received a death threat from two violent inmates and fled to Canada in 1970. He received political asylum in Sweden in 1971.

Les Bayless was interviewed for the 2013 documentary Hit & Stay.
