= Marjorie Bradford Melville =

Former Roman Catholic nun and peace activist (Born 1929)

Margarita Melville
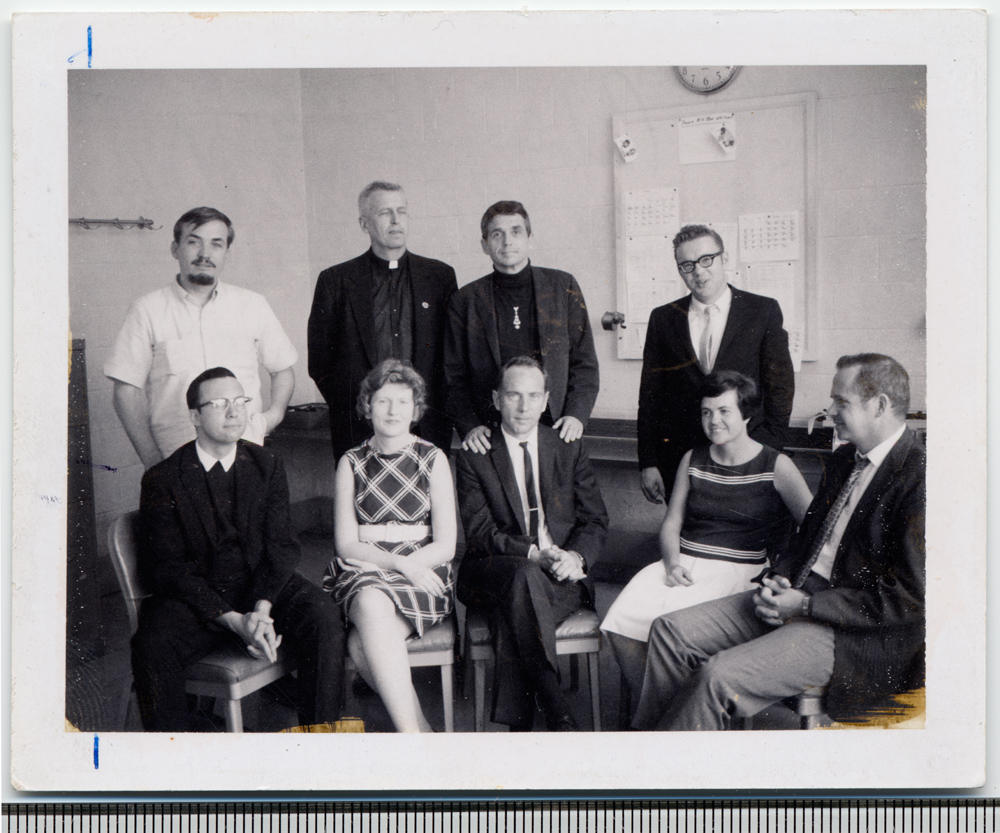
- The Catonsville Nine seated, second from right
- Born: August 19, 1929 (age 97); Irapuato, Guanajuato, Mexico
- Occupations: Former Maryknoll sister, peace activist, university professor, dean
- Years active: 1957–1995
- Known for: Catonsville Nine activism

Margarita Melville (previously Marjorie Bradford Melville) (born August 19, 1929) is a Mexican-born American anti-war activist, and retired university professor and associate dean. Melville's advocacy for Guatemala led her and her husband to join the group known as the Catonsville Nine.

== Early life ==
Born in 1929 in Irapuato, Guanajuato, Mexico, she is the daughter of a Mexican-American mother and an American father. Growing up in the 1930s under Mexico's prevalent anti-Catholicism, she learned about home masses and sisters who had to remain incognita while teaching.

== Religious life ==
In St. Louis, Missouri she joined the Maryknoll Sisters of St. Dominic in 1949 as Sister Marian Peter, and remained for almost two decades. She graduated from Mary Rogers College in Ossining, New York with a bachelor of education degree in 1954. She was sent by her order that year to Jacaltenango, a remote community in Huehuetenango in Guatemala's western highlands. Her posting in Guatemala in 1954 coincided with the year Carlos Castillo Armas overthrew Jacobo Árbenz, with the support of the CIA. Although she worked in a prosperous area as a teacher, the Maryknollers gradually became more aware of the plight of the Guatemalan poor, and she began taking short courses with the Jesuits on these issues, and studied both in Guatemala and the United States.

== Marriage ==
In Mexico City she married Thomas R. Melville, a former Catholic Maryknoll priest, who had worked in Guatemala for ten years before also being expelled in 1967 by Guatemalan and Church authorities for his role in planning the formation of a Christian unit to graft onto the guerrilla movement that was fighting Guatemala's military rulers. Their story is told in detail in their 1971 memoir, Whose Heaven, Whose Earth.

== Catonsville Nine ==
The Catonsville Nine used homemade napalm to burn draft records in the parking lot of the Catonsville, Maryland draft board on May 17, 1968. Although the Catonsville Nine is widely believed to have acted in protest of Vietnam, for the Melvilles it was much more about Guatemala. According to Peters (80), Tom Melville committed to the action without discussing it with Marjorie, who had deep reservations. They were newlyweds, and she dreaded the idea of jail apart from one another for months or years. She finally decided of her own free will to participate. It was she and Mary Moylan who went into the Draft Board offices first, alongside Tom Lewis. Peters notes that she made a point of wearing a dress that wouldn't wrinkle in anticipation of being arrested and unable to change for a couple of days (97). She blocked one of the female clerks in the raid by putting one hand on the desk and the other on a wall. She also provided a safety pin for George Mische's trousers that famously came loose, part of what Mische later called the "comic opera" of the raid. Before reporting to the Federal Women's Prison Camp in Alderson, West Virginia for her two-year sentence, she and her husband spoke to many antiwar groups. Because she spoke fluent Spanish from her years in Guatemala, she befriended many of the Spanish-speaking women in prison.

== Post-prison ==
Jane Fonda and Donald Sutherland hoped to play the Melvilles in a movie about their book, but it never materialized because the Melvilles had second thoughts. Melville graduated with a M.A. in Latin American studies and Ph.D. in Anthropology from the American University, Washington, D.C. She joined the University of Houston in 1976, where she continued her work as an activist for women's and Chicano causes. She left the University of Houston for the University of California, Berkeley in 1986, where she was a Professor and Associate Dean until her retirement in 1995.
