= Thomas Melville (writer) =

American priest, activist and writer

Thomas Robert Melville (1930–2017) was an American priest, activist and writer. He was born in Boston Massachusetts on December 5, 1930, and he wanted to be a priest since he was five. He and his brother, Arthur Melville, were both ordained as Maryknoll priests. He went to Guatemala in 1957, where he worked closely with local peasants. He was expelled by the government as a result of his organizing work. He left the priestly order and, in 1968, married another ex-Maryknoll sister Marjorie Bradford in Mexico. Returning to the US, the couple continued to be vocal in the Guatemalan cause, which eventually led them to be part of the Catonsville Nine group of antiwar Catholic activists.

After serving out their prison sentence, both Melville and his wife obtained doctorate degrees. He wrote several books on Guatemala and Central America, some of them cowritten with his wife.

== Time in Guatemala ==
In August 1957, Thomas Melville arrived in Guatemala as a Maryknoll priest and spent the next few months in Guatemala City. In February 1958, he was sent to Father Jim Curtin in San Miguel Acatán as an assistant pastor. Once there, he was assigned to serve two outlying municipalities, San Rafael Petzal and San Sebastián Coatán. After one year, he was reassigned to San Pedro Soloma under Father John Breen, who placed him in charge of the church in San Juan Ixcoy. He upset the townspeople while updating the church building. Melville asked his superior, Father Gerbermann, to legitimize his actions. The Father declared Melville psychologically unfit and told Melville to leave the country. Melville was given a second chance by Father Gerbermann when a fellow Maryknoll priest fell ill, and no one else was available to replace him. This time Thomas Melville was given the express instructions to aid the indigenous and allow them to be themselves.

Melville's new assignment was a church in Cabricán. The helped the locals buy a truck to haul firewood and stones to expedite their production of lime. He convinced them to purchase a new one to save on repair costs for a used truck. Melville paid for a new truck, trailer, and tractor using funds provided by Maryknoll. As the cooperative grew, the original truck was replaced by two diesel trucks. The cooperative built a two-story factory to increase their processing and production. The building was the largest structure in the town. The co-op was limited by the amount of land available to them. To help alleviate this issue, Melville helped establish a colony of families in Petén. The settlement was named Pope John XXIII Colony.

After six years of helping the people of Cabricán, Melville was asked by Father Gerbermann to be in charge of coordinating social action programs in Huehuetenango. In the spring of 1966, he moved to Acul and met Sister Marjorie Bradford later that year. She introduced Thomas and Arthur to a FAR (Rebel Armed Forces). In November 1967, Melville attended the first major meeting of the Christian revolutionaries in the city of Escuintla. Thomas, Marjorie, and Arthur were told to leave Guatemala by both Maryknoll and the U.S. embassy. Shortly after their departure, members of FAR and anyone associated with them were rounded up by Guatemalan authorities. After arriving in the United States on December 21, 1967, they traveled separately on busses to Mexico to avoid detection by Guatemalan and Mexican authorities.

The Melville brothers and Marjorie's development of communistic organizations and involvement with the guerrillas, would later be referred to as the "Melville Incident."

== Works ==
- Guatemala: The Politics of Land Ownership
- Through a Glass Darkly: The U.S. Holocaust in Central America
- Guatemala - Another Vietnam? (with Marjorie Melville) (published in the Pelican Latin American Library)
- Whose Heaven, Whose Earth? (with Marjorie Melville)
