= Larry Rosebaugh =

American Catholic priest, peace activist, and missionary

Reverend Larry Rosebaugh OMI
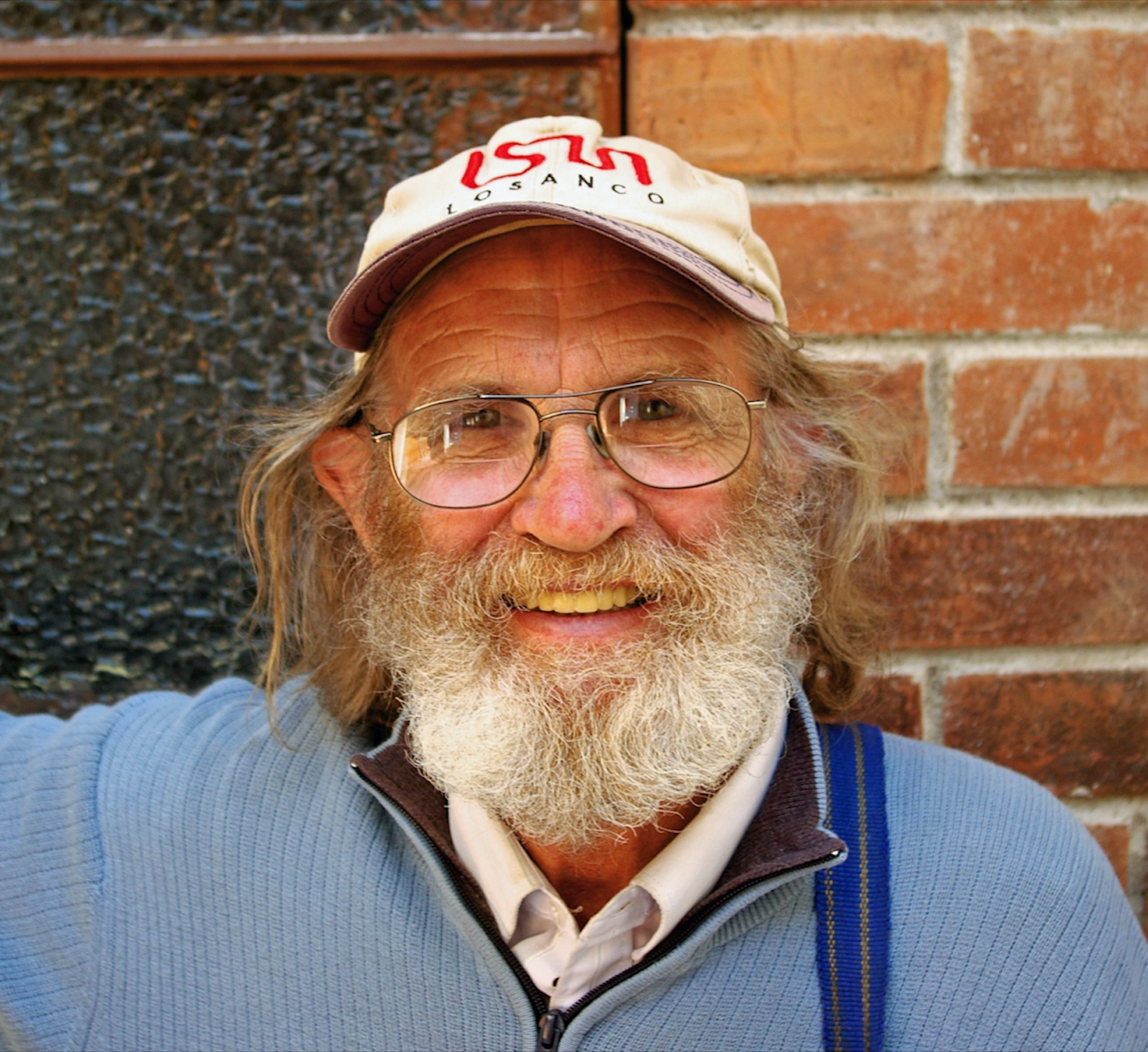
- Fr. Larry Rosebaugh in Guatemala ca. 2006

Orders
- Ordination: March 30, 1963

Personal details
- Born: Lawrence Rosebaugh; May 16, 1935 Appleton, Wisconsin
- Died: May 18, 2009 (aged 74) Parque nacional Laguna Lachuá, Guatemala
- Buried: Guatemala City, Guatemala
- Denomination: Roman Catholic
- Parents: Mildred Lucille (O'Gorman) Rosebaugh and Donald Phillip Rosebaugh
- Occupation: Catholic priest, missionary

Lawrence "Larry" Rosebaugh (also called Lorenzo) (May 16, 1935 – May 18, 2009) was an American streetwise priest, peace activist, and missionary from Wisconsin who spent many years working in Central and South America. He was murdered by masked gunmen in Guatemala in 2009.

== Early life ==
Rosebaugh was born in Appleton, Wisconsin on 16 May 1935, the son of Donald and Mildred (O’Gorman) Rosebaugh. His father worked as an insurance claims adjuster and was eventually transferred to the St. Louis area, where Rosebaugh attended Catholic elementary and secondary schools. Pursuing membership in the Missionary Oblates of Mary Immaculate, he attended St. Henry's Seminary in Belleville, Illinois, and completed his theological studies at Our Lady of Snows Scholasticate, the Oblate seminary in Pass Christian, Mississippi. He made his perpetual vows as a member of the Oblates in August 1960, and was ordained to the priesthood in March 1963.

== Milwaukee ==
After a brief parish assignment and several years of teaching high school in Duluth, Minnesota and Chicago, he moved to Milwaukee in 1968 to work at Casa Maria Hospitality House, a facility linked with the Catholic Worker movement which gives shelter to homeless families and women. Soon after his arrival he became one of the Milwaukee Fourteen, a group of anti-Vietnam War peace activists (including six Catholic clergy) who in September 1968 broke into Milwaukee draft board offices, removing and burning some of the files in a nearby plaza while holding a prayer service. In his autobiography, Rosebaugh summed up the group's intentions, "The whole purpose of our action had been to get the issue of whether the war in Vietnam is moral or immoral, just or unjust and whether the United States should be at war there into the public eye ..."

The Milwaukee Fourteen were found guilty of theft, arson, and burglary. Most members of the group would be eligible for parole in fourteen months, but Rosebaugh served an extra ten months in prison for his principled refusal to work while incarcerated. He explained, "As much as I wanted to be free, I was now more than ever convinced that there was a moral question at stake here, the immorality of our military presence in Vietnam, and so I once again said that I would do no work while doing time in prison."

== Brazil ==
In 1975, Rosebaugh hitchhiked from St. Louis, Missouri to his new assignment in Recife, Brazil, where he worked with the poorest of the poor at the request of Archbishop Dom Helder Camara. In 1977, Rosebaugh and a Mennonite lay worker were arrested by police on the fabricated charge that they had stolen the cart they were pushing. Rosebaugh explained, "It appeared a ruse simply to get us off the city streets where we were witnesses to the many abuses against the women, children and men forced to take up their existence there for lack of any alternative." During their four-day detention, they were beaten and held without clothing in a cell with about thirty other men. They were released due to a persistent effort by Dom Helder Camara. U.S. First Lady Rosalynn Carter later met and spoke with the missionaries while on a goodwill tour of Latin America.

== Return to the United States ==
Rosebaugh returned to the United States in August 1980 to rest and recover from hepatitis.

In the summer of 1981 he became one of a group of six nonviolent anti-nuclear protestors at the Pantex plant near Amarillo, Texas. They climbed a fence and prayed before being arrested. Held for two months before trial, Rosebaugh was visited by Bishop Leroy Matthiesen, who soon after urged Catholic workers at the nuclear assembly plant to find other employment. Eventually, Rosebaugh began a ten-month sentence at the federal prison in Terre Haute, Indiana but again refused to work and was sent to the federal prison in Chicago. He was released in February 1982.

Throughout the period from 1982 to 1986, Rosebaugh was affiliated with the Catholic Worker House in New York City.

In the summer of 1983 Rosebaugh and Roy Bourgeois engaged in a nonviolent direct action at what was then known as the School of the Americas in Fort Benning, Georgia. Bourgeois had come to believe that this program was training Central American soldiers and police in techniques for the torture and abuse of civilians. He, Rosebaugh and Linda Ventimiglia dressed in military uniforms and entered a wooded area at Fort Benning. From high up in a tree, aimed at the barracks of soldiers from El Salvador, Bourgeois played a recording of recently slain Archbishop Oscar Romero begging the soldiers of El Salvador to stop their repression of the Salvadoran people. Rosebaugh was sentenced to a year and a day, and he served this time at federal prisons in Oklahoma City and La Tuna, Texas, where he continued his principled refusal to work and was punished with solitary confinement.

== Mexico and El Salvador ==
After his time in prison, Rosebaugh accepted an invitation to devote a year to establish a mission with lay people in the Emiliano Zapata barrio of Cuauhtemoc in Chihuahua, Mexico. Here he would celebrate weekly liturgies and help to restore and construct buildings that the community would need, while getting to know the people of the place. During this year, he learned of another Christian volunteer project in El Salvador, and in 1986 he began his work there.

From shortly after his arrival in 1986 until 1990, Rosebaugh served as a parish priest in the small town of Estanzuelas. During this time of the Salvadoran Civil War, as he traveled to a meeting in San Salvador, Rosebaugh was arrested on the unfounded suspicion that he was a subversive in league with guerrillas. He was held in threatening circumstances for a day until the U. S. Embassy procured his release.

In early March 1990, Rosebaugh and members of his parish helped to resettle Salvadoran refugees who had fled to Honduras during the civil war. After living several years in crowded Honduran camps, these retornados purchased and moved onto land which they named Nuevo Gualcho. Five months after this, Rosebaugh left his parish in Estanzuelas in order to work in Nuevo Gualcho. This work often consisted of helping the community to cultivate the land and produce cement blocks for construction projects. In response to some who would criticize this "unpriestly" labor, Rosebaugh wrote,

If our people are living in poverty and children are dying from malnutrition daily and there is something we can do to help better that condition through some talent or knowledge we may have, that to me is what we should be doing. The sacraments and religious instruction must wait till the immediate needs are seen to. And what is more sacramental and holy than planting corn or building bricks with the community, when its survival depends on these things?

In the spring of 1992, at the request of his religious superior, Rosebaugh agreed to leave El Salvador and return to the United States. He would make the three-week journey on a bicycle, riding through Guatemala and Mexico up to Brownsville, Texas.

== Guatemala ==
In 1993 he was assigned to the Oblate mission in Guatemala. He first lived within the tightly organized life of San Martin de Porres parish at Chicamán. After about nine months he moved again to take up ministry with two other Oblate priests farther north, near the Mexican border at Playa Grande, Ixcan. Most of this work involved difficult journeys to far-flung villages, offering sacramental services, and attending to the needs of people traumatized by the violence of the Guatemalan civil war.

In 2000 Rosebaugh returned to the United States in order to care for his ailing mother. After her death, he spent a period of time at his Order's novitiate in Godfrey, Illinois where he wrote his autobiography, To Wisdom through Failure: A Journey of Compassion, Resistance and Hope. Writing after his death, Carolyn Griffeth remembers,

After writing his autobiography, which was truly a labor of love for this man of action more than words, I asked Lorenzo, at 71 years old, what would be the last, unwritten, chapter of his life. Lorenzo responded that he longed to return to Guatemala. He spent the next three years ministering to people with AIDS and bathing the elderly poor there.

== Death ==
Rosebaugh was murdered on 18 May 2009 by masked gunmen in northern Guatemala. A news report at the time offered the details:

According to official sources, an American Catholic priest has died and another from the Congo has been left severely injured following an attack in the Laguna Lachua National Park (Alta Verapaz), a rural community in northern Guatemala. The event occurred on Monday night, on a rural highway that links the towns of Chisec with Ixcan, at about 500 kilometers to the north of the capital city. Two masked-men with rifles stopped the car, which contained five priests – all members of the Oblates of Mary Immaculate – who were on their way to a town named Laguna Lachua, where they were to have a retreat. After robbing them of all their belongings, the armed men shot the priests, leaving American priest Fr. Lorenzo Rosebaugh, age 74, dead on the spot and severely wounding Fr. Jean-Claude Ngoma, age 47, of the Democratic Republic of Congo.

In 2012 Rosebaugh's religious order reported on the outcome of the investigation, arrest and trial of the three, not two, attackers:

Three years after the death of Fr. Lorenzo, absolutely nothing is known about the motive and the identity of the killers. On October 28, 2009, the police captured Pedro Choc, Miguel Xo Botzoc and Alfredo Xo. However, after almost six months of trial, the court of Cobán found them innocent and they were set free for lack of hard evidence, despite the fact that the bullet found on the dead body of Fr. Lorenzo, according to ballistics experts, matched one of the guns, a 22 caliber automatic Magnum, owned by Don Pedro Choc.

Some who understood the nature of Rosebaugh's work and its location suspected that his death may have involved more than highway robbery.

The robbery was not unusual for Oblates working in Guatemala, especially in the north, where the order's priests previously have been stopped by thieves. Nevertheless, by the end of the week, some of Rosebaugh's friends began questioning whether there were political motives behind his murder. "Was it really theft?" [Francis Cardinal] George asked. "Or had he once again spoken truth in such a way that powerful interests were angry?" [Cardinal George had known Rosebaugh since their shared time in the OMI seminary]

== Funeral and tributes ==
A funeral service was held on 20 May 2009 at St. Cecilia Parish in Guatemala City, Guatemala. In the eulogy on that day, Rosebaugh was characterized as "a mixture of St. John the Baptist and St. Francis of Assisi."

Reflecting on Rosebaugh's death, John Dear offered a summary of the meaning of his life.

How to reconcile that one so dedicated to nonviolence should suffer such brutality? But then Larry expended his life in solidarity with those who suffer violence. Even, as it happened, to the point of death. He served the poor throughout the Americas, resisted war, suffered imprisonments -- and throughout, he carried himself humbly, quietly and prayerfully.
