= Catonsville Nine =

1968 civil disobedience in Maryland, US

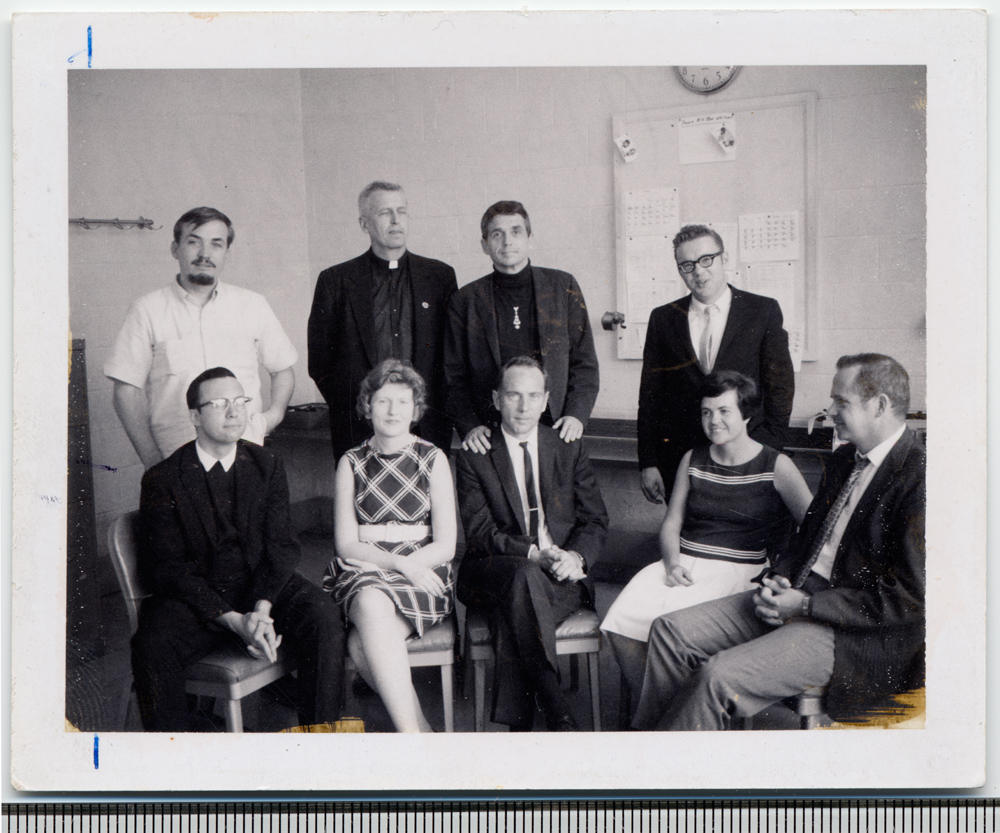
- Leaders: Philip Berrigan; George Mische
- Dates active: 1967–1968
- Active regions: Catonsville, Maryland, U.S.
- Ideology: Anti-war, Catholicism, leftism
- Size: 9
- Wars: the Opposition to the Vietnam War

The Catonsville Nine were nine American Roman Catholic activists who burned draft files to protest the Vietnam War. On May 17, 1968, they took 378 draft files from the draft board office in Catonsville, Maryland, and burned them by pouring home made napalm on them in the parking lot.

== List of the Nine ==
Catonsville Nine Incident
- Part of the Opposition to the Vietnam War
- Date: May 17, 1968
- Location: Catonsville, Maryland, U.S. 39.270886°N 76.739219°W
- Caused by: Vietnam War
- Goals: Destruction of conscription cards
- Methods: Arson, theft, protest
- Status: Ended, movement still active
- Result: 378 draft records destroyed Possible saving of lives from conscription

Parties
- Baltimore County Police Department
- Federal Bureau of Investigation
- Selective Service System

Lead figures
FBI Director J. Edgar Hoover; Federal Judge Roszel Cathcart Thomsen	Father Daniel Berrigan SJ; George Mische

Injuries and arrests
- Injuries: 1 (minor)
- Arrested: 9
- Charged: Philip Berrigan & Tom Lewis (3.5 years)^{1} Daniel Berrigan, Thomas Melville, and George Mische (3 years); Mary Moylan, Marjorie Bradford Melville, David Darst, and John Hogan (2 years)^{2}
- Fined: $22,000
- ^{1}Phil Berrigan & Tom Lewis were sentenced for both the Catonsville incident and the 1967 Custom House raid^{2}Sentenced to two years only since they were not considered leaders of the group

The Nine were:

- Father Philip Berrigan, a Josephite priest
- Father Daniel Berrigan, a Jesuit priest
- Br. David Darst, a De La Salle Christian Brother
- John Hogan
- Tom Lewis, an artist
- Marjorie Bradford Melville, a former Maryknoll sister
- Thomas Melville, a former Maryknoll priest
- George Mische
- Mary Moylan

== History ==
George Mische and Father Phil Berrigan were prime organizers of the Catonsville Nine. The organizing process was very democratic, with lengthy meetings and voting by raised hands.

=== 1967 Custom House raid ===
On October 17, 1967, Fr. Philip Berrigan and Tom Lewis raided the Baltimore City Custom House and poured blood on draft records as part of "The Baltimore Four" (with David Eberhardt and James Mengel) and were out on bail when they burned the records at Catonsville. (The first documented action against draft files is reputed to have been by Barry Bondhus in Minnesota, who, along with other family members, carried human waste into a draft board and defaced draft records.)

=== 1968 Catonsville incident ===
On May 17, 1968, the Nine went to the Catonsville office of the Selective Service on Frederick Road. They restrained an employee while gathering records into wire bins, One SSS employee, Mary Murphy, attempted to save the draft records but was restrained by one of the Nine. They then took the bins to the parking lot and set fire to them. They then recited the Lord's Prayer and explained to news crews that they were protesting the Vietnam War. Three hundred and seventy-eight draft records were destroyed.

Baltimore County police officers arrested the nine. While they were in jail, the group sent a basket of flowers to the clerk on duty at the office during the event, along with a letter explaining they didn't intend to injure anyone.

The Catonsville Nine were tried in federal court October 5–9, 1968, defended by William Kunstler. They were found guilty of destruction of U.S. property, destruction of Selective Service files, and interference with the Selective Service Act of 1967. They were also sentenced to a total of 18 years in jail and fined $22,000. Mary Moylan, Philip Berrigan, Daniel Berrigan, and George Mische failed to report for the beginning of their sentences. Daniel Berrigan caused considerable embarrassment to FBI by giving sermons at various events while a fugitive.

== Aftermath ==
Brother David was killed in an auto accident on October 30, 1969 in the 28th year of his life and in his 10th year as a Christian Brother. Consequently, he was unable to serve his sentence.

Tom Lewis had been sentenced to six years for a prior protest one week after Catonsville, and had three and a half years added to be served concurrently.

Fr. Daniel Berrigan was convicted and sentenced to three years in prison to begin on April 9, 1970. According to Anke Wessels, director of Cornell's Center for Religion, Ethics, and Social Policy, "On the very day he was scheduled to begin his prison term, he left his office keys on a secretary's desk in Anabel Taylor Hall and disappeared." Cornell marked Berrigan's impending imprisonment by conducting a weekend-long "America Is Hard to Find" event April 17–19, 1970, which included a public appearance by the then-fugitive Berrigan before a crowd of 15,000 in Barton Hall. On August 11, 1970, the FBI found and arrested Berrigan at the home of William Stringfellow and Anthony Towne. He was released from Danbury prison in 1972. Lewis was released in 1971.

The "Nine" inspired many other anti-draft and anti-military actions in the 1960s and 1970s, including the Milwaukee 14, D.C. 9, Silver Spring 3, Chicago 8, Harrisburg 7, Camden 28. Participants sometimes remained at the scene to be arrested, sometimes they departed in order to avoid arrest. It is unknown how many persons were not drafted because of these actions.

External videos
- Q&A interview with Joe Tropea and Skizz Cyzyk on their documentary Hit & Stay, June 17, 2018, C-SPAN

As of 2009 the movement had morphed into the continuing Plowshares movement with an emphasis on nuclear weapons. The group's actions, along with the Catonsville Nine and earlier actions, have been detailed online by Jonah House.

== In popular culture ==
- A book A Chronology of Plowshares Disarmament Actions (1980–2003) was compiled by Arthur Laffin.
- The Catonsville Nine and Baltimore Four were the subject of the 2013 documentary Hit & Stay by Joe Tropea and Skizz Cyzyk.
- The 1971 play The Trial of The Catonsville Nine - Gordon Davidson, director
- The 1972 film The Trial of The Catonsville Nine - Gordon Davidson, director; Gregory Peck, producer
- A documentary film, Holy Outlaw, about Daniel Berrigan - exists only on 16 mm.
- A documentary about the "Plowshares 8" - In the King of Prussia by Emile d'Antonio
- A documentary film about the event, Investigation of a Flame, was produced in 2001 by the filmmaker Lynne Sachs.
- The Chairman Dances' song "Catonsville 9 (Thomas and Marjorie)", in which “Thomas and Marjorie are depicted on their drive to Catonsville with homemade napalm on their laps, imagining their marriage in and after prison.”
- Dar Williams's song, "I Had No Right", from her album The Green World, is about the trial of the Catonsville Nine.
- Adrienne Rich's poem "The Burning of Paper Instead of Children" makes numerous references to the Catonsville Nine and includes an epigraph from Daniel Berrigan during the trial ("I was in danger of verbalizing my moral impulses out of existence").
- The song "War No More" describes the draft action of the Catonsville Nine. It was composed by Joe DeFilippo and recorded and performed by the R.J. Phillips Band.
- The Chip Taylor song "Nine Soldiers In Baltimore", an inspirational account
- A fictionalized depiction of the 1968 Catonsville incident occurs in the 2023 Showtime miniseries, Fellow Travelers.

=== The Trial of the Catonsville Nine (play) ===
Fr. Daniel Berrigan wrote a play in free verse, The Trial of the Catonsville Nine, about the trial. The version performed is usually an adaptation into regular dialogue by Saul Levitt. The play is based on a partial transcript of the trial.

In 1972 a film version of the play was produced by Gregory Peck. It cost $300,000 and Peck "lost every penny".

In 2009, it was presented on a tour by a company called "the Actors' Gang" of Culver City, California, founded by film star Tim Robbins.

=== The Trial and Prison (portfolio) ===
In 1969, while briefly released on appeal, Tom Lewis published a portfolio of etchings he made while imprisoned at Lewisburg Federal Penitentiary. It contains ten etchings, in a run of fifty copies, some printed with ink he had to scrounge together from ashes, coffee or cocoa powder. He wrote accompanying text and the cover was printed by fellow Catholic activist Corita Kent. The etchings depict the psychic torment of his fellow prisoners by suicidal thoughts, boredom or isolation, as well as scenes of police brutality.

== See also ==
- Protests of 1968
