= Hit & Stay =

- Directed by: Joe Tropea and Skizz Cyzyk
- Produced by: Joe Tropea
- Starring: The Catonsville Nine, The Baltimore Four, Noam Chomsky, Amy Goodman, Howard Zinn, Bill Ayers
- Cinematography: Skizz Cyzyk
- Edited by: Skizz Cyzyk
- Release date: 2013
- Running time: 97 minutes
- Country: United States
- Language: English

Hit & Stay is a 2013 documentary directed by Joe Tropea and Skizz Cyzyk. It looks at the actions of the Catonsville Nine and the Baltimore Four taken in protest of the Vietnam War, and the influence of these actions and the activists behind them on subsequent progressive political protests. The press labeled this group "the Catholic Left." The film contains interviews with many of the activists who took part in these actions, as well some of the F.B.I. agents who monitored them. It also contains contemporary commentary on the influence of these actions from such names as Bill Ayers, Noam Chomsky, Ramsey Clark, Amy Goodman, Howard Zinn, and Laura Whitehorn.

Hit & Stay premiered at the 2013 Chicago Underground Film Festival, where it won the Audience Award. It made its Baltimore premiere at the Maryland Film Festival. The documentary made its premiere in the South at the Sidewalk Moving Picture Festival where it won the Best Documentary Feature award.

== List of protest actions explored in the film ==
- The Baltimore Four (1967)
- The Catonsville Nine (1968)
- The Boston Two (1968)
- The Milwaukee 14 (1968)
- The D.C. Nine (1969)
- The Chicago Fifteen (1969)
- Women against Daddy Warbucks (1969)
- The New York Eight (1969)
- The Beaver 55 (1969)
- The Boston Eight (1969)
- The East Coast Conspiracy to Save Lives in Philadelphia (1970)
- Rhode Island Political Offensive for Freedom (R.I.P.O.F.F.) (1970)
- The Delaware Actions (1970)
- Brothers and sisters a.k.a. The New Haven action (1970)
- The Flower City Conspiracy (1970)
- The Hoover Vacuum Conspiracy (1970)
- The Citizens' Commission to Investigate the FBI (1971)
- The Four of Us (1971)
- The Buffalo (1971)
- The Camden 28 (1971)
