= United States v. Dougherty =

- Court: United States Court of Appeals for the District of Columbia Circuit
- Full case name: United States v. Michael R. Dougherty, et al
- Argued: September 21, 1971
- Decided: June 30, 1972
- Citations: 473 F.2d 1113; 154 U.S. App. D.C. 76

Case history
- Subsequent history: Rehearing denied in No. 24318, October 26, 1972.

Court membership
- Judges sitting: David L. Bazelon, Harold Leventhal, Arlin Adams (3rd Cir.)

Case opinions
- Majority: Leventhal
- Concur/dissent: Bazelon
- Dissent: Adams

United States v. Dougherty, 473 F.2d 1113 (D.C. Cir. 1972) was a 1972 decision by the United States Court of Appeals for the District of Columbia in which the court ruled that members of the D.C. Nine, who had broken into Dow Chemical Company, vandalized office furniture and equipment, and spilled about a bloodlike substance, were not entitled to a new trial on the basis of the judge's failing to allow a jury nullification jury instruction. The Appeals Court ruled, by a 2–1 vote:

The fact that there is widespread existence of the jury's prerogative, and approval of its existence as a "necessary counter to casehardened judges and arbitrary prosecutors," does not establish as an imperative that the jury must be informed by the judge of that power. On the contrary, it is pragmatically useful to structure instructions in such wise that the jury must feel strongly about the values involved in the case, so strongly that it must itself identify the case as establishing a call of high conscience, and must independently initiate and undertake an act in contravention of the established instructions. This requirement of independent jury conception confines the happening of the lawless jury to the occasional instance that does not violate, and viewed as an exception may even enhance, the over-all normative effect of the rule of law. An explicit instruction to a jury conveys an implied approval that runs the risk of degrading the legal structure requisite for true freedom, for an ordered liberty that protects against anarchy as well as tyranny.

Nonetheless, the defendants were given a new trial on the grounds that they had been denied their right of self-representation. The Circuit Judges' assumption that jurors know about their nullification prerogative has since been brought into question by other empirical evidence. According to Irwin Horowitz, "Beyond the empirical issue, lack of nullification instructions maintains a deceit. After all, juries can nullify, but they know this fact only on a sotto voce level."
