= Lynne Sachs =

American experimental filmmaker (born 1961)

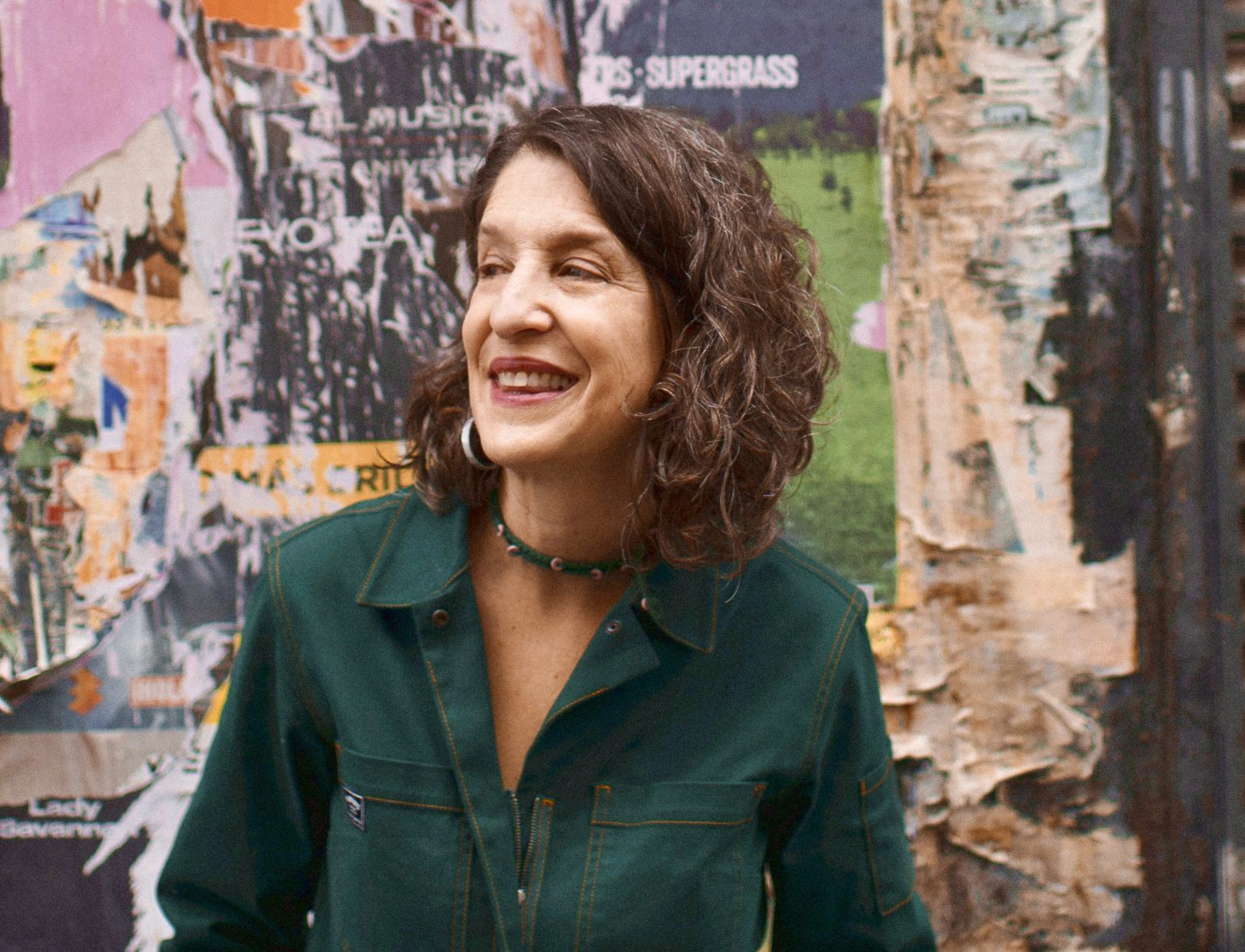
- Lynne Sachs in May 2022
- Born: 1961 (age 64–65); Memphis, Tennessee, U.S.
- Occupation: Filmmaker
- Known for: Experimental film, documentary film, media arts
- Spouse: Mark Street
- Website: lynnesachs.com

Lynne Sachs (born 1961) is an American experimental filmmaker and poet living in Brooklyn, New York. Her moving image work ranges from documentaries, to essay films, to experimental shorts, to hybrid live performances. Working from a feminist perspective, Sachs weaves together social criticism with personal subjectivity. Her films embrace a radical use of archives, performance and intricate sound work. Between 2013 and 2020, she collaborated with musician and sound artist Stephen Vitiello on five films.

== Early life and education ==
Sachs graduated from Brown University with a major in history, and a focus on studio art. She developed an interest in experimental documentary filmmaking while attending the 1985 Robert J. Flaherty Documentary Film Seminar through a scholarship. There, she was inspired by the works of Bruce Conner, who would later become her mentor, and Maya Deren. She took her first media arts classes at Global Village and Downtown Community Television Center in New York City. Soon thereafter, Sachs moved to San Francisco to attend San Francisco State University and later the San Francisco Art Institute.

It was during this time in San Francisco that she studied and collaborated with George Kuchar, Trinh T. Minh-ha, Craig Baldwin, and Gunvor Nelson. During this time, she produced her early, experimental works on celluloid which took a feminist approach to the creation of images and writing— a commitment that has grounded her body of work ever since.

== Career ==
=== 1989 – early 2000s ===
After completing her education in San Francisco, Sachs returned to her hometown of Memphis in 1989 to shoot Sermons and Sacred Pictures. This was her first long-format experimental documentary. The film is a portrait of Reverend L. O. Taylor, an African-American minister and filmmaker from the 1930s and 1940s. This film screened at the Museum of Modern Art and the Margaret Mead Film Festival that year.

From 1994 to 2006 Sachs worked in geographic locations affected by international war, such as Vietnam, Bosnia, Israel and Germany. Her films and web projects expose what she defines as the "limits of a conventional documentary representation of both the past and the present". It is in this style that she has produced five pieces (Which Way Is East, The House of Drafts, Investigation of a Flame, States of Unbelonging and The Last Happy Day) grouped together as the I Am Not A War Photographer series.

In 2007, the Buenos Aires International Festival of Independent Cinema presented a retrospective of her work. That same year, she collaborated with Chris Marker on a remake of his short film Three Cheers for the Whale. She returned to Argentina in 2008 to film her first narrative project, Wind in Our Hair, inspired by the short stories of Julio Cortázar.

Commissioned in 2008 by the New York Public Library, Lynne Sachs ventured into the realm of online installations with the web piece Abecedarium NYC. The interactive project is an online alphabet of obscure words represented by short films made by Sachs and other collaborators such as filmmakers Barbara Hammer, David Gatten and George Kuchar. In addition to this, the project is meant to stand as an ongoing exploration through participatory blog threads and collaboration with other online media forums open to the public.

In addition to her work with the moving image, Sachs co-edited the 2009 Millennium Film Journal issue on "Experiments in Documentary" and co-curated the 2014 film series "We Landed/ I Was Born/ Passing By: NYC's Chinatown on Film" at Anthology Film Archives.

=== 2010–present ===
In 2010, Sachs teamed up with her brother Ira Sachs and decided to adapt his short film Last Address into an exterior window installation on the sides of the Kimmel Center in Manhattan, New York. The piece is a meditation on some of the most prolific New York-based artists of the 1980s and 1990s who died of AIDS in this city, including Ethyl Eichelberger, David Wojnarowicz and Reynaldo Arenas.

In 2011, Oxford University Press published The Essay Film: From Montaigne After Marker, a book by Timothy Corrigan which dedicates a chapter to discussing Sachs's film States of Unbelonging in relation to works by Harun Farocki and Ari Folman.

In 2013, Sachs completed the hybrid-documentary Your Day is My Night which features residents of a New York City Chinatown shift-bed apartment sharing their stories of personal and political upheaval. The film premiered at the Museum of Modern Art Documentary Fortnight and later screened at the Ann Arbor Film Festival, the Images Festival, the Vancouver International Film Festival and the Traverse City Film Festival. Stuart Klawans of The Nation wrote, the film is "a strikingly handsome, meditative work: a mixture of reportage, dreams, memories and playacting, which immerses you in an entire world that you might unknowingly pass on the corner of Hester Street."

Between 2013 and 2020, she collaborated with sound artist Stephen Vitiello on five films – Your Day is My Night, Drift and Bough, Tip of My Tongue, The Washing Society and Film About a Father Who. In February 2021, the LA Film Forum celebrated their collaborations with a series of screenings and conversations.

From 2014-2017, Sachs collaborated with playwright Lizzie Olesker on a series of site-specific, live performances titled Every Fold Matters, which examined the charged, intimate space of the neighborhood laundromat and the people who work there. Over a two-year period of research and interviews with NYC laundry workers, Sachs and Olesker worked with performers Ching Valdes-Aran, Jasmine Holloway, Veraalba Santa, and Tony Torn in their hybrid-doc The Washing Society (2018). The film premiered in New York at the Brooklyn Academy of Music's BAMcinemaFest.

In 2019, Tender Buttons Press published Sachs's collection Year by Year Poems.

In 2020, Sachs premiered her feature documentary Film About a Father Who as the opening night film at Slamdance Film Festival in Park City, Utah. Film About a Father Who received critical acclaim, earning a New York Times Critic's Pick which called the movie "[A] brisk, prismatic and richly psychodramatic family portrait."

== Reception ==
A 2020 article in Hyperallergic following Sachs' Sheffield Doc/Fest retrospective described Sachs' work as follows, "Lynne Sachs has always eluded easy labeling ... She focuses on capturing gestures, inches of skin, fragments of conversations, casual moments in time, personal memorabilia, and weaving them into unexpected patterns ... [She] sublimes the personal into the theatrical ... [and] embraces variegated renditions of filmic language, recording the world, digesting it, and offering it to viewers in its performative beauty."

Following her 2021 retrospective, "Lynne Sachs: Between Thought and Expression" with the Museum of the Moving Image, film critic Kat Sachs wrote of Sachs's films in Mubi Notebook, "Sachs has centered herself insomuch as she's looking out at the world that encircles her, viewing it thoughtfully yet from a studied distance."

== Awards and honors ==
Sachs' work has been supported by fellowships from the Rockefeller Foundation and Jerome Foundation, the New York State Council on the Arts, New York Foundation for the Arts as well as residencies at the Experimental Television Center and the MacDowell Colony. In 2014, Sachs received a Guggenheim Foundation Fellowship in film and video.

Sachs's films have screened at the Museum of Modern Art, the Pacific Film Archive, the Sundance Film Festival, the New York Film Festival, Docaviv, Doclisboa, the Wexner Center for the Arts, the Walker Art Center, and the J. Paul Getty Museum.

Retrospectives of her work have been presented at the Museum of the Moving Image, Sheffield Doc/Fest, Buenos Aires International Festival of Independent Cinema, Festival International Nuevo Cine in Havana (Havana Film Festival), and China Women's Film Festival.

Her 2019 film A Month of Single Frames – made with and for Barbara Hammer– won the Grand Prize at the International Short Film Festival Oberhausen in 2020.

In 2021, both the Edison Film Festival and the Prismatic Ground Film Festival at the Maysles Documentary Center awarded Sachs for her body of work in the experimental and documentary fields.

== Academia ==
Sachs has taught at New York University, Hunter College, The New School, Maryland Institute, and the University of California, Berkeley.

== Films and other media ==
In her films, Sachs has said she wants to rupture traditional chronological narrative.

- Drawn and Quartered (1986)
- Still Life With Woman and Four Objects (1986)
- Following the Object to Its Logical Beginning (1987)
- Sermons and Sacred Pictures (1989)
- The House of Science: a museum of false facts (1991)
- Which Way Is East: Notebooks from Vietnam (1994)
- A Biography of Lilith (1997)
- Window Work (2000) (This video-art can be found in Experimental Television Center.)
- Photograph of Wind (2001)
- Horror Vacui: Nature Abhors a Vacuum (2000)
- Investigation of a Flame (2001)
- Tornado (2002)
- The House of Drafts (2002)
- Atalanta 32 Years Later (2006)
- Noa, Noa (2006)
- The Small Ones (2006)
- States of UnBelonging (2006)
- XY Chromosome Project (2007)
- Abecedarium: NYC (2007)
- Georgic for a Forgotten Planet (2008)
- The Last Happy Day (2009)
- Wind in Our Hair (2009)
- Cuadro por cuadro (2009)
- The Task of the Translator (2010)
- Sound of a Shadow (2011)
- Same Stream Twice (2012)
- Your Day is My Night (2013)
- Drift and Bough (2014)
- Starfish Aorta Colossus (2015)
- Tip of My Tongue (2017)
- A Year in Notes and Numbers (2017)
- And Then We Marched. (2017)
- The Washing Society (2018, co-directed by Lizzie Olesker)
- Carolee, Barbara, and Gunvor (2018)
- Year by Year Poems (2019)
- A Month of Single Frames (2019)
- Film About A Father Who (2020)
- Girl is Presence (2020)
- Visit to Bernadette Mayer's Childhood Home (2020)
- Orange Glow (2020)
- Maya at 24 (2021)
- E•pis•to•lar•y: letter to Jean Vigo (2021)
