= Richard McSorley =

American Jesuit priest and philosopher

Richard McSorley (October 2, 1914 – October 17, 2002) was a Jesuit priest and peace studies Professor at Georgetown University.

In 1964 he was unofficially assigned by Robert F. Kennedy to give counsel to his sister-in-law, Jacqueline Kennedy at Georgetown University. Five years later Bill Clinton asked him to say a prayer for peace at St. Mark's Church. McSorley founded the Center for Peace Studies at Georgetown.

He had a PhD in Philosophy from Ottawa University and he taught philosophy at Scranton University attracting crowds to his courses. He is the author of the following books:

- It's a Sin to Build a Nuclear Weapon
- New Testament Basis of Peacemaking
- Peace Prospects for Three Worlds
- Kill? For Peace?
- The More the Merrier.

McSorley received the Distinguished Teacher Award in 1985 from Georgetown's alumni. The McSorley Award was established by Georgetown University's Program of Justice and Peace. He marched with Martin Luther King Jr. He was awarded the title Ambassador of Peace by Pax Christi. Bill Clinton sent a condolence letter on his death describing him as a “man of great character who always stood by his abiding commitment to promoting and expanding his belief in the cause of peace, fearless in the face of harshest criticism, unwavering in his search for moral reason while inspiring many to do the same."

He founded The Dorothy Day Catholic Worker House in Washington, DC.

According to Philip Berrigan, McSorley gave him the homemade napalm recipe that the Catonsville 9 used to burn draft records. McSorley found in a Special Forces handbook in the Georgetown University Law Center library.

On and off for years he stood in the middle of the Georgetown University campus, protesting its ROTC program, by holding a sign saying "Should we teach life + love or death + hate?"
