= Acul =

- Municipality
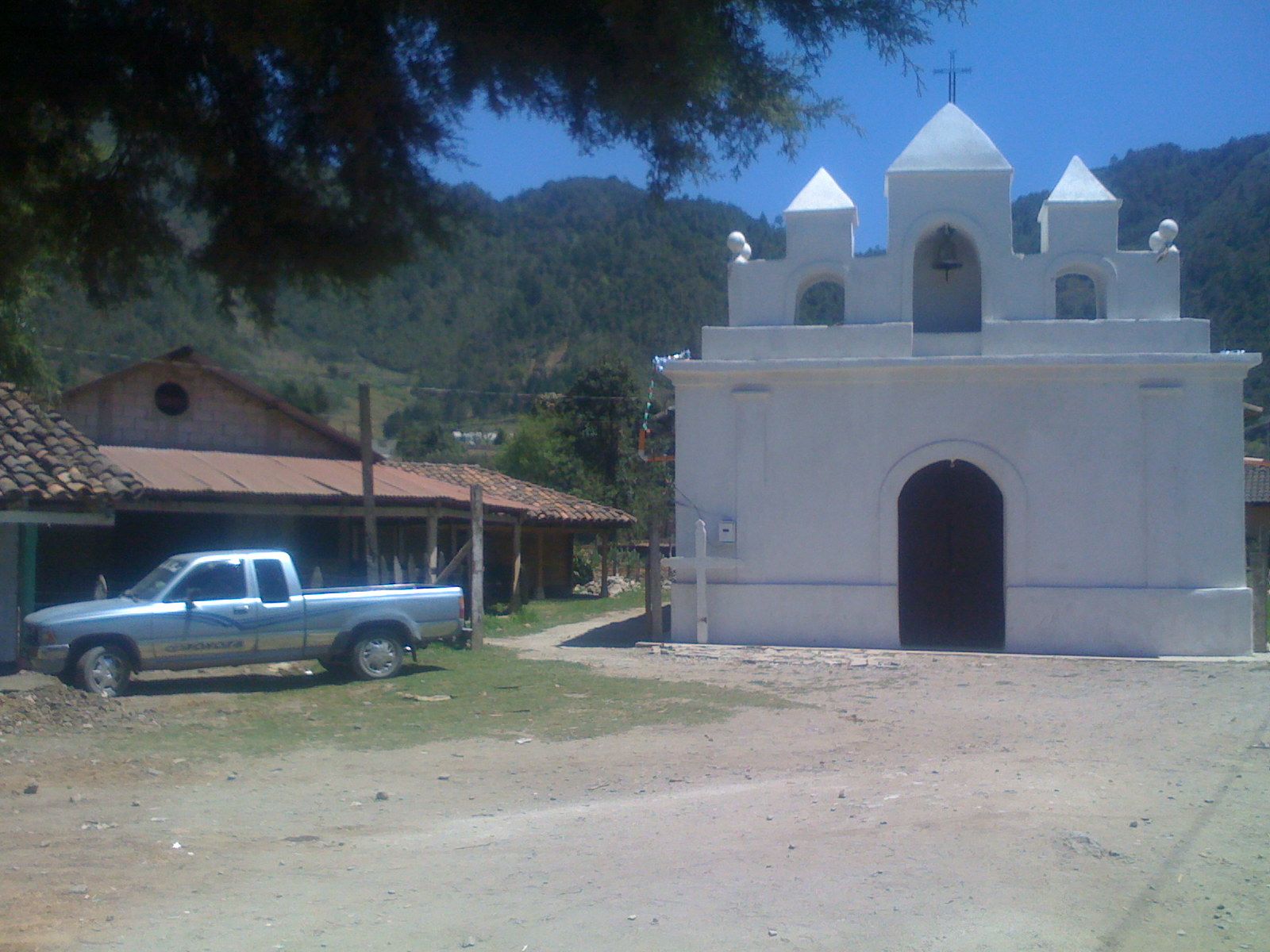

- Location of Acul in Guatemala
- Coordinates: 15.417711°N 91.14732°W
- Country: Guatemala
- Department: El Quiché
- Municipality: Acul

Government
  - Type: Municipal

Population
  - Urban: c. 2,000
  - Ethnicities: Ixil K'iche'
  - Religions: Roman Catholicism Evangelicalism Maya

Acul is a town in the Quiché Department in Guatemala. It is located just north but out of view from the town of Nebaj. The town was destroyed and much of its population brutally massacred by the National Army in the Guatemalan Civil War, but was later rebuilt in 1983 by the Government of Guatemala as a model town for other settlements similarly affected by the violence of the Civil War.
