= Milwaukee Fourteen =

Peace protest against the Vietnam War

- Dates active: 24 September 1968
- Active regions: Milwaukee, Wisconsin, U.S.
- Ideology: Anti-war, Catholicism, leftism
- Size: 14
- Wars: Opposition to the Vietnam War

The Milwaukee Fourteen were fourteen peace activists who burned Selective Service records to protest the Vietnam War. On September 24, 1968, they entered Milwaukee's Brumder Building, site of nine Wisconsin draft boards, gathered up about 10,000 files, carried them to an open public space, and set them on fire with homemade napalm. The fourteen then remained at the site, singing and reading from the gospels of John and Luke as Milwaukee firemen and police officers arrived. The subsequent trial of twelve of the protestors became the first resistance trial in which the defendants chose to represent themselves. After a trial of eleven days, the defendants were each found guilty of theft, arson, and burglary.

== List of the Fourteen (as described at the time of the action) ==
- Don Cotton, 24, co-chairman of Students for a Democratic Society at Saint Louis University
- Michael Cullen, 26, director of Casa Maria House of Hospitality in Milwaukee
- Robert Cunnane, 36, Catholic priest, co-director of the Packard Manse Ecumenical Center, Stoughton, Massachusetts
- James Forest, 27, co-chairman of the Catholic Peace Fellowship
- Jerry Gardner, 24, graduate student Marquette University, Milwaukee
- Bob Graf, 25, editor of The Catholic Radical and graduate student in sociology at Marquette University
- James Harney, 28, Catholic priest, curate of a parish church in North Weymouth, Massachusetts
- John Higgenbotham, 27, minister of the Church of Scientology and a draft counselor in St. Cloud, Minnesota
- Alfred Janicke, Catholic priest of the Archdiocese of St. Paul-Minneapolis
- Doug Marvy, 27, a resistance organizer in Minneapolis and a Navy veteran
- Anthony Mullaney, 39, Benedictine priest, held a Ph.D in psychology and had taught at St. Anselm College in New Hampshire and at Boston University
- Fred Ojile, 23, draft counselor and church program organizer for the Twin Cities Draft Information Center
- Basil O'Leary, 48, Catholic brother, head of the Economics department at St. Mary's College in Winona, Minnesota
- Larry Rosebaugh, 33, Catholic priest on the staff of Casa Maria House of Hospitality in Milwaukee

== Prelude and planning ==
As a response to the violence of the war in Vietnam and its links to the injustices of conscription and poverty in the United States, the Milwaukee action was preceded by several similar protests. In February 1966 Barry Bondhus destroyed draft files in Elk River, Minnesota by pouring human excrement over them. In October 1967 four men poured blood on draft records at the Baltimore City Custom House. Then, on May 17, 1968 nine protestors burned draft records in Catonsville, Maryland.

The Milwaukee group was inspired by the action in Catonsville and "timed their action to draw attention to the upcoming trial of the Catonsville Nine." George Mische of the Catonsville Nine was one of the planners. Jim Forest and Daniel Berrigan traveled to Milwaukee where they met with Michael Cullen, George Mische and others at Casa Maria, a Catholic Worker house of hospitality. According to Forest, "On our second night at Casa Maria, Dan and I found ourselves drinking beer in a crowded kitchen in which several of those present, Michael among them, made clear they were eager to follow the Catonsville example."

In August 1968 a retreat was held at St. Paul's Abbey near Newton, New Jersey to consider who of those present might participate in another draft board action—and when it would take place. Forest describes it:

The gathering was shaped liked a retreat, with Mass each morning and a period of Bible study later in the day. In addition there were sessions at which we got to know each other, discuss our motives and backgrounds, and to make decisions about who would take part in the action, who would form a support team, and which of several cities being considered should be chosen.

Forest explained the decision to act in Milwaukee,

There were several cities that were being considered (New York City, where I lived, wasn't one of them) and two or three people appointed to see what the possibilities might be. When we met to hear the reports, it was clear that Milwaukee was the best site; more people from our group came from Milwaukee than any place else and there were nine draft boards side by side on the same floor of the same office building, with a convenient little park ideal for burning the draft records right across the street.

The group agreed to come together in Milwaukee on September 22.

== The action ==
The night before the event, the Milwaukee 14 gathered together and determined their roles for the burglary portion of the action. The afternoon of the event, the men walked side by side ["in pairs from a variety of starting points"] to the building that housed the nine different draft boards, with burlap bags to collect the 1-A draft files.

Shortly before 6:00 on Tuesday evening, September 24, 1968, the group entered the second floor offices where the draft boards were located in Milwaukee's Brumder Building. They encountered a cleaning woman from whom they took office keys. Later, at the trial she would describe their manner towards her as "very respectful." Files classified as 1-A and "other files that were in a drawer marked 'Delinquent' — people who were in trouble with the Selective Service System"— were gathered and carried out of the building and across W. Wells Street to a grassy area (now known as Postman's Square) and piled at the foot of a flagpole dedicated to dead World War I soldiers. A car drove up from which canisters of napalm were taken; they were poured over the pile of burlap bags and set on fire.

The group understood the importance of public attention to and awareness of their action. Through the Milwaukee Organizing Committee, an anti-war and anti-draft group, they had contacted the local media and, safeguarding the details of the action, led them by an indirect route to the site.

The deed done, the Fourteen gathered together in a supportive embrace and waited to be arrested, singing the Lord's Prayer and reading scripture as fire trucks wailed in the distance. As the records continued to burn, a few pedestrians stopped to observe. Others did a quick double take and kept on walking. Michael Kirkhorn, a reporter from the Milwaukee Journal, began asking people walking by for their response. An older man, hearing the prayers and seeing the clerical collars of the priests as they gathered around the burning draft records, muttered, "I bet they never read any scripture." One young man exclaimed hopefully, "Maybe they got mine."

By 6:04 p.m., firemen had extinguished the fire with some draft records still blowing in the wind. Cullen gave a short speech as the firemen raked the embers: "We love all of you who are putting out the fire. We have done this because we love America. We believe America has done wrong in Vietnam." By this point, the police had arrived and began gently pushing the Fourteen toward the patrol wagons. The protesters offered no resistance, nor did the police officers use much force or even seem to be in a hurry as they made their arrests. By 6:15, all the Fourteen were in the patrol wagons heading for the Milwaukee County Safety Building. By the time the police had hauled the group away, around one hundred Milwaukee bystanders bore witness to the action.

In a statement released to the press, the Fourteen explained their reason for targeting the draft boards.

Our action concentrates on the Selective Service System because its relation to murder is immediate. Men are drafted — or "volunteer" for fear of being drafted — as killers for the state. Their victims litter the planet. In Vietnam alone, where nearly 30,000 Americans have died, no one can count the Vietnamese dead, crippled, the mentally maimed. Today we destroy Selective Service System files because men need to be reminded that property is not sacred. Property belongs to the human scene only if man does. If anything tangible is sacred, it is the gift of life and flesh, flesh which is daily burned, made homeless, butchered ...

=== Immediate responses ===
On the day after the action, September 25, total bail for the group was set at what was seen as an extraordinarily high $430,000 by Judge Christ Seraphim. Eventually this was reduced by another judge and, after a month in jail, the Fourteen were released on bail to await trial in May of the following year.

Throughout the city there were many heated and negative responses to the destruction of draft files. The Milwaukee County Council unanimously condemned the act. A Milwaukee Journal editorial called the protest "inexcusable hooliganism," and the paper published a cartoon that compared the Milwaukee Fourteen to Nazis, members of the Ku Klux Klan and other fanatical groups.

The white working class base of the city's Democratic Party was angry:

Although the war was not necessarily popular among these white blue-collar voters, they despised the protests and protesters—whom they associated with civil rights marchers—even more. It was their sons who were being sacrificed in Vietnam, and they resented college kids, and now even Catholic priests, telling them that their sons had died or might die for an unjust cause.

Support was found on local college campuses and among those who had recently worked for civil rights and fair housing practices in Milwaukee. Fr. James Groppi, a prominent Milwaukee priest known for his civil rights work, stood up for the Fourteen. He helped to set up the Milwaukee Fourteen Defense Fund and on October 1—together with comedian Dick Gregory—led a rally of 150 people who marched to the Milwaukee County Safety Building to sing and chant their support for the jailed activists.

== The trials ==
=== The State of Wisconsin trial ===
On May 5, 1969 Judge Charles Larson, at the request of the Milwaukee District Attorneys, decided to postpone the trial until June 23, but a few hours later he re-set the starting date for May 12. As a result, twelve members of the group were tried by the State of Wisconsin from May 12–26, 1969, charged with theft, arson, and burglary. They had decided to represent themselves. "This gave us greater leeway to express our views," explains Jim Forest. As Francine du Plessix Gray, who was present for the trial, observed, "Another purpose of the draft board raids is to turn American courtrooms into political forums on the illegality and the immorality of the Vietnam war."

The trial was presided over by Judge Larson. The jury consisted of "eight men, four women, one of them black, eight of them Catholics." State prosecutors were Deputy District Attorney Allen Samson and Assistant D. A. Harold Jackson Jr. There were no defense attorneys since twelve members had chosen to defend themselves. Two of the accused—Michael Cullen and Jerry Gardner—had decided to retain counsel.

On May 26 the jury was given instructions and sent out. They deliberated for seventy minutes and returned to find the defendants guilty on all counts of theft, arson, and burglary. They would remain free on bail until sentencing.

At sentencing on June 6, each member was given the same punishment of two years, with the possibility of parole after 14 months. The trial transcript for June 6 indicates that the sentences were given as follows:

"[F]or the crime of larceny to property valued in excess of $100 … the court sentences you to two years confinement in the Wisconsin State Prison; for the offense of arson … the court sentences you to two years in the Wisconsin State Prison, the sentences to be served concurrently; for the offense of burglary … the court sentences you to four years in Wisconsin State prisons, but … the court stays execution of the sentences for burglary of four years just imposed and places you on probation … to commence after you have served the two-year concurrent terms for the charges on which you have been sentenced."

Gray noted that the Milwaukee Twelve's pro se defense had produced some fresh outcomes for the anti-war movement. "This first attempt at legal self-defense raised the political issues as no previous resistance trial had done. It had tortured the consciences of a few in power. The defendants had been let off lightly. The twelve could be paroled, after all, in a mere fourteen months. Movement lawyers began to write manuals for lay advocacy."

Two members of the group were not tried with "the Twelve", but they also were sentenced. Michael Cullen was an Irish citizen whose legal situation had been complicated by his immigrant status. He retained an attorney for his separate federal trial, was found guilty, and sentenced. Jerry Gardner pleaded "guilty" and had no trial.

=== The Federal trial ===
On June 9, 1969 the twelve found themselves in a Federal District courtroom, facing charges of "destroying government property and interfering with the working of the Selective Service System"

Journalist Gray was present to report: "After a tedious voirdire of two and a half days in which he cross-examined 141 prospective jurors—mostly hostile to the defendants—Federal District Judge Myron Gordon dismissed the government charges against the twelve on grounds that 'prejudicial pre-trial publicity' caused by modern press media had made a fair trial impossible." Gray notes that this was not particularly good news for the defendants since, if a re-trial were to be held and a conviction obtained, many months of punishment could have been added to their state sentences. But there was no re-trial.
