= Thomas Lewis (activist) =

American activist (1940–2008)

Tom Lewis
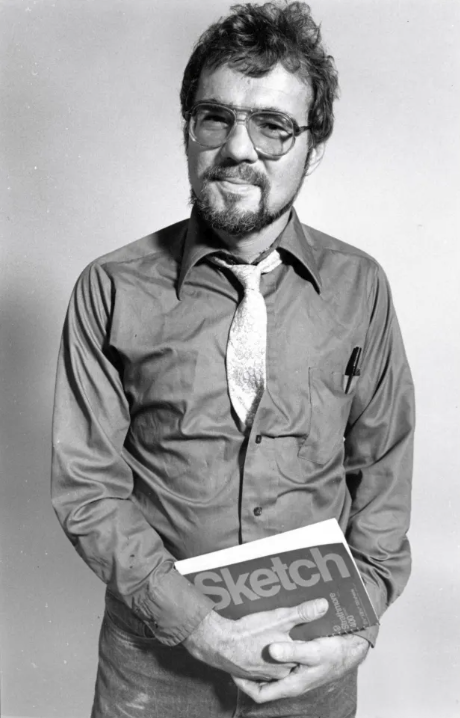
- Born: March 17, 1940; Uniontown, Pennsylvania, United States
- Died: April 8, 2008 (aged 68); Worcester, Massachusetts, United States
- Resting place: Conscientious Objectors Cemetery; Sherborn, Massachusetts
- Education: Maryland Institute College of Art, Loyola University Baltimore, Georgetown University, Johns Hopkins University (coursework only)
- Occupations: Artist, activist
- Known for: The Baltimore Four, The Catonsville Nine, Plowshares, and other peace activism.
- Spouse: Andrea Borbély
- Children: Nora Lewis-Borbely
- Parent(s): John Albert Lewis; Pauline Lewis

Thomas P. Lewis (March 17, 1940 – April 4, 2008) was an artist and peace activist, primarily noted for his participation in the antiwar activist groups the Baltimore Four and the Catonsville Nine, and his work in the Plowshares movement.

== Biography ==
Thomas Pahl Lewis was born in Uniontown, Pennsylvania and raised in Baltimore, Maryland. His middle name was his mother's maiden name. He graduated from Mount Saint Joseph High School, where he was a star football halfback. He turned down a college football scholarship, instead studying art at the Maryland Institute College of Art, Johns Hopkins University, and two Jesuit institutions, Georgetown University, and Loyola University Maryland. His brother went to Vietnam in 1965, and the experience turned Lewis against the war. He joined the National Guard after high school, hoping to serve his country, and served eight years. He later studied art with two renowned realist painters from Baltimore, Earl Hofmann, and classical painter and sculptor Joseph Sheppard. He also visited priest friends in Italy and was inspired by works in Florence's Uffizi Gallery.

Lewis was a well-known artist throughout the Worcester area, running printmaking workshops at the Worcester Art Museum for almost twenty years. Many of his pieces still survive in galleries and archives throughout the USA. He was an art teacher at Anna Maria College, and he taught printmaking at the Cambridge School of Weston, and Worcester Art Museum.

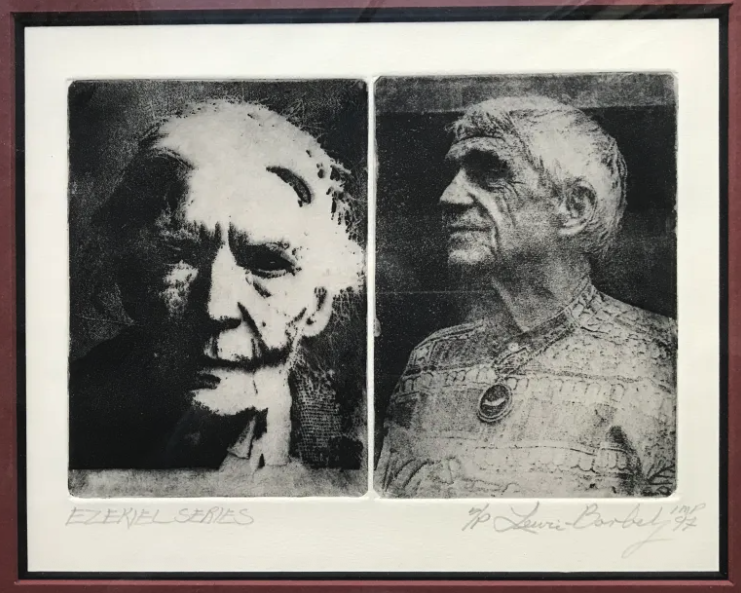
Tom Lewis, portrait of two key influences, Dorothy Day and Daniel Berrigan

=== Entry into peace activism ===
Lewis traced his life in activism back to a protest by the Congress of Racial Equality (CORE) against the segregated Gwynn Oak Amusement Park in 1963. He had planned on sketching as a journalist for a Catholic publication, but when he saw the racist actions from some in the counter-protest, he felt compelled to participate. He subsequently joined CORE. His art became political accordingly, without severing ties with his religious background; in one example, in 1965 he made a woodcut of an antiwar speech Pope Paul VI made at the United Nations.

He became a memorable figure in peace circles for his combination of art and activism. Daniel Berrigan described his art as "…a poignant and powerful witness to the survival of the endangered conscience…. He heals the ancient split between ethics and imagination."

=== Baltimore Four and Catonsville Nine ===
He and Philip Berrigan co-founded the Baltimore Interfaith Peace Mission in 1967. After Lewis attended an interfaith antiwar gathering in the midwest that year, he returned to Baltimore thinking about planning nonviolent actions at draft boards.

In 1967 he co-gathered the anti-war activist group that became known as the Baltimore Four, pouring their own blood on draft files at the Baltimore Customs House. Besides Lewis, the Four were Philip Berrigan; poet, teacher and writer David Eberhardt; and United Church of Christ missionary and pastor James L. Mengel). As they waited for the police to arrive and arrest them, the group passed out Bibles and calmly explained to draft board employees the reasons for their actions.

While on trial for this protest, Lewis engaged in a more daring one with the Catonsville Nine, who burned draft files with homemade napalm in Catonsville, Maryland. One week later he was sentenced to six years in federal prison for the Baltimore Four protest, and in November 1968 to another three and a half years for the Catonsville Nine. He was ultimately released in 1971, serving out his sentence chiefly at the minimum-security prison farm at Lewisburg Federal Penitentiary.

While in prison Lewis continued to produce art, including over one hundred portraits of his fellow inmates, which he always produced in duplicate to allow his subjects to keep one themselves. The culmination of his work there was a portfolio of etchings, The Trial and Prison, published in fifty copies to raise funds for the movement in 1969, while Lewis was briefly out on appeal. Produced in a prison art studio Lewis had to share with mafia members (for whom it doubled as stash house for smuggled wine and spaghetti), at times using ink of his own concoction from ashes, coffee or cocoa powder, the etchings depict the psychic distress of his fellow inmates and ghostly, near apocalyptic confrontations between police and protestors. The text was written by Lewis, and the cover printed by Corita Kent.

=== Plowshares actions ===
He first participated in the Transfiguration Plowshares (East) action in 1987, at the South Weymouth Naval Air Station. Ten years later, on Ash Wednesday 1997, he joined Susan Crane, Steve Kelly, S.J, Steve Baggarly, Mark Colville, Phil Berrigan, protesting the Aegis destroyer nuclear submarine at the Bath Iron Works in Maine.^{[1]} They hammered and poured blood on different parts of the battleship, including the pilot house, the bridge, the helicopter pad, and several missile hatch covers. As they read their action statement and unfurled a banner, armed military security forcibly pushed them to the deck and placed them under arrest.^{[2]} Through this he developed close ties with the Catholic Worker Movement. His art became political accordingly, without severing ties with his religious background; in one example, in 1965 he made a woodcut of an antiwar speech Pope Paul VI made at the United Nations.^{[3]}

In July 2012, when Megan Rice, Gregory Boertje-Obed, and Michael Walli entered the Y-12 National Security Complex to perform a Plowshares movement action known as Transform Now Plowshares, Lewis had already been dead for four years. However, they carried his banked blood in baby bottles, mixed with their own blood and poultry blood, to pour on the buildings, because he had asked for this as a dying wish.

=== PeaceChain 18 ===
The day after the invasion of Iraq on March 21, 2003, Lewis and 17 other activists using a peace chain organized by the Peace Abbey Foundation in Sherborn, Massachusetts. They blocked the Natick Chemical Weapons Research Laboratory and were arrested. In this context, a peace chain is a line of people (a few, or even hundreds) who hold onto links of a chain that they carry. It is inherently nonviolent, but difficult to break apart even if law enforcement succeeds in arresting some of its human links, and it has been used worldwide. A photo of the Peace Chain 18 is on the cover of the 2003 book Liberating Faith: Religious Voices for Justice, Peace, and Ecological Wisdom. Lewis spoke before the judge during the trial about the consequences of the invasion, concluding along with others in the group that "I morally can't pay a fine." He, along with the other members of PeaceChain 18, was convicted for trespassing and disturbing the peace.

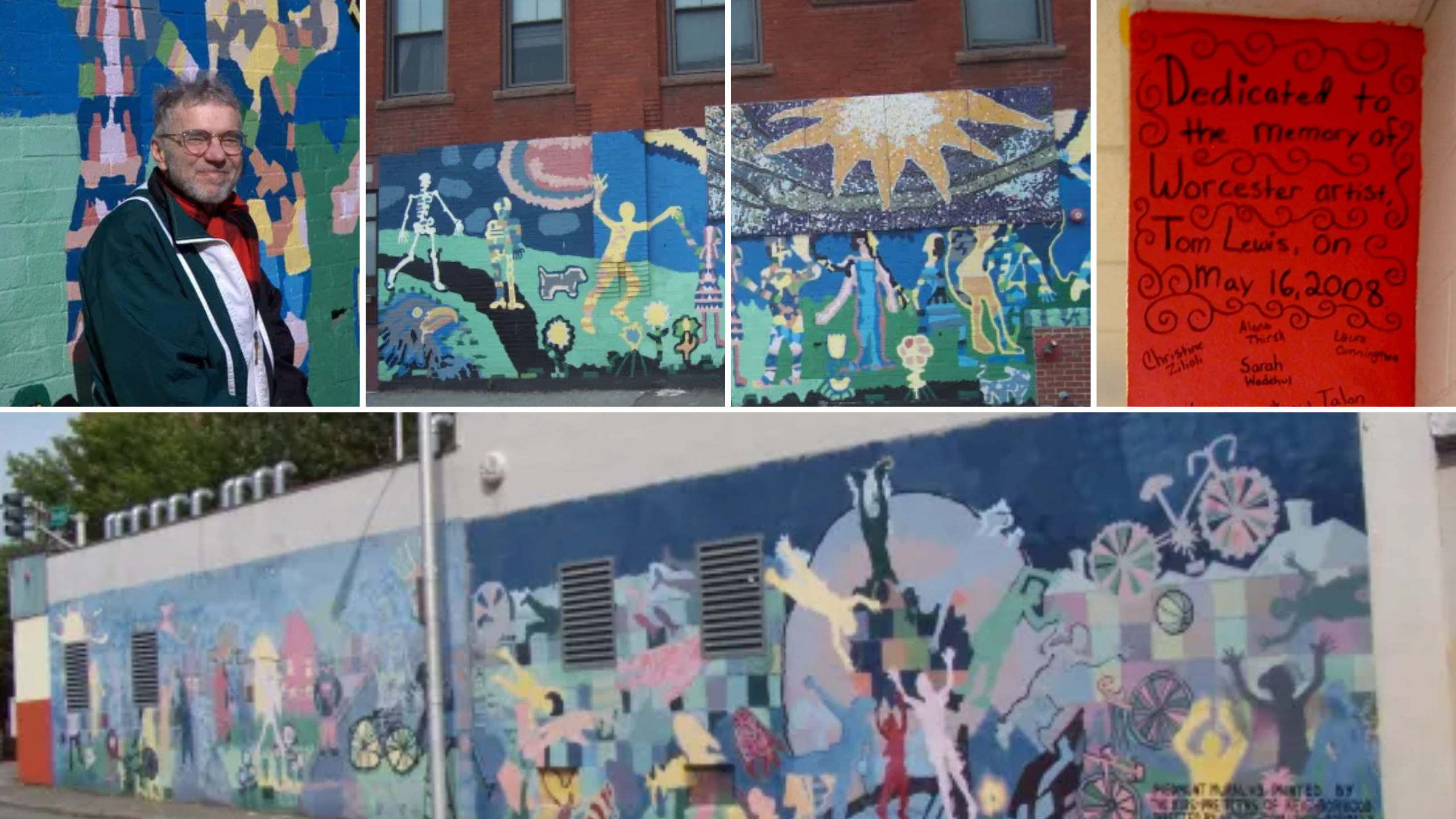
Student murals dedicated to Tom Lewis, who taught them art along with their teacher, Alice Gentili.

== Personal life ==
He met his wife Andrea Borbély at the Community for Creative Nonviolence in Washington, DC, in 1988, and a reporter for National Catholic Reporter noted that "resistance was part of their wedding vows." During his marriage he sometimes signed his work Tom Lewis-Borbely. They had a daughter, Nora Lewis-Borbely, who is an animation line producer at DreamWorks.

In this later years he lived at and managed Emma House, a community in Worcester, Massachusetts named for a late African-American woman who once lived there. He often volunteered at the Mustard Seed Catholic Worker that was across the street from Emma House, where he was a member. He taught a group of students at the Miscoe Hill Middle School in Mendon, Massachusetts, and worked with their teacher Alice Gentili to create murals that were dedicated to him after his unexpected death.

Lewis died at age 68 in his sleep on April 4, 2008. A memorial mass was held at the Mustard Seed Catholic Worker. A portion of his cremated remains is buried at the Conscientious Objectors cemetery on the grounds of the Pacifist Memorial in Sherborn, Massachusetts.

== See also ==
- List of peace activists

== Sources ==
- Berrigan, Daniel (1970). The Trial of the Catonsville Nine. Boston: Beacon Press. ISBN 0-8070-0549-5.
- Berrigan, Daniel (1983). Nightmare of God. Portland: Sunburst Press. ISBN 0-934648-08-5.
- Lynd, Straughton; & Lynd, Alice (Eds.) (1995). Nonviolence in America: A Documentary History. Maryknoll, NY: Orbis Books.
