= D.C. Nine =

The D.C. Nine were nine men and women, including seven who were priests and nuns, who engaged in a daytime protest against the Dow Chemical Company and its production of napalm and were charged with malicious destruction of property and unlawful entry. This group was part new generation of Catholic activists who undertook demonstrations in the late 1960s, such as the Catonsville Nine, that pushed the limits of Nonviolent resistance. The nine were:

- Rev. Robert T. Begin, 30, a priest from Cleveland, Ohio
- Rev. Dennis J. Moloney, 28, a priest from Detroit, Michigan
- Sister Joann Malone, 28, a Catholic schoolteacher from St. Louis, Missouri
- Michael Slaski, 20, of Detroit, Michigan
- Rev. Bernard Meyer, 31, a priest of Cleveland, Ohio
- Rev. Arthur G. Melville, 36, a former priest of San Francisco, California
- Catherine Melville, 32, a former nun, of Girard, Ohio
- Rev. Joseph F. O’Rourke, 30, a Jesuit in formation, of Woodstock, Maryland
- Rev. Michael R. Dougherty, 34, former U.S. Army paratrooper, of Hamburg, New York

The trial was a chaotic public spectacle, and all defendants were sentenced, although eventually only Catherine Melville and the Rev. Bernard Meyer did time. In the aftermath, most left the church, and Dow Chemical stopped supplying napalm to the US military in 1969.

== Legal Judgement ==
They attempted to present a political defense, but the judge instructed the jury, "The Vietnam War is not an issue in this case. You are not trying ideas. You are not trying the United States. You are not trying society...Therefore, if you find beyond a reasonable doubt that one or more of the defendants had the required intent to commit one or more of the offenses with which they are charged, then it is no defense that he or she also had one or more other intentions, reasons, purposes or motives, such as to protest against the Vietnam War or the activities of the Dow Company; nor is it a defense that he or she acted from sincere, religious motives, or that he or she believed that his or her intent was justified by some higher law." The defendants were also not allowed to proceed pro se, since the judge was concerned that they would disrupt the proceedings. They were convicted, but were granted new trials due to the denial of their right to self-representation. Their appellate case, United States v. Dougherty, had important implications for the jurisprudence surrounding jury nullification.
