= George Mische =

American Roman Catholic peace activist (1937–2026)

George J. Mische (July 30, 1937 – May 4, 2026)^{[a]}was an American Roman Catholic peace activist, best known for his part as one of the Catonsville Nine. He was also one of the planners of the Milwaukee Fourteen. On May 17, 1968, the group burned 378 1A draft cards with homemade napalm in a parking lot just outside the draft board office in Catonsville, Maryland. Mische was one of the key organizers, and he has spent some energy in the ensuing decades correcting popular myths about the story.

== Early life and education ==
George Joseph Mische was born July 30, 1937, in St. Cloud, Minnesota to Cecelia and Louis Mische, and was one of five boys. His father was a German immigrant and labor organizer who worked at a veterans' hospital, and had nearly been deported when he was accused of being a communist. Two of Mische's brothers were also activists. Gerald F. Mische co-founded the Catholic-based Association for International Development in 1957. Another brother founded a Catholic Worker house in Chicago. George Mische spent time among the wounded and emotionally broken veterans at the hospital, and developed his anti-war stance. He attended St. Cloud State College, dropping out after one quarter, and then joined the U. S. Army in 1955. He was discharged in 1960 and first attended the Jesuit St. Peter's College, followed by Gannon College, graduating in 1963.

Mische died on May 4, 2026, at the age of 88.

== Notes ==
[a] - Mische's birth year has been listed as 1938 by Digital Maryland, but the vast majority of sources give 1937 as his year of birth
