= Draft board =

Agency that screens US military draftees

Draft boards are components of the Selective Service System which would adjudicate claims for deferment or exemption from compulsory military service, or for assignment to noncombatant service or alternative civilian service, in the event of the activation of conscription in the United States.

== Local board ==
The local draft board is a board that would hear and make initial administrative decisions on claims for deferment or exemption from military service or assignment to noncombatant service or alternative civilian service by residents of a specific county or counties. Each local draft board has jurisdiction over a county or as many as five counties. Some counties have more than one local board. The law requires each draft board to have at least three members, and requires a multi-county board to have at least one member from each county over which it has jurisdiction. Board members are appointed by the President on the recommendation of the Director of the Selective Service System.

== Appeal boards ==
Decisions of a local draft board could be appealed first to a district appeal board, then to the national appeal board, and then to the Director of the Selective Service System. Final administrative decisions by the Director could be challenged in Federal court.

== Status of draft boards ==
Draft boards were disbanded when the Selective Service System was placed "deep standby" in 1975. New boards were appointed after Selective Service registration was reinstated in 1980.

Prior to 1975, draft boards and their local staff carried out registration and classification of draft-eligible men. Since 1980, registration has been carried out nationally by the Selective Service System. Draft boards have no role in registration and would have no role in classification unless and until an individual requests a deferment or exemption or assignment to noncombatant service or alternative civilian service after being ordered to report for induction.

Lists of draft board members have not been published by the Selective Service System, but have been released in response to requests under the Freedom Of Information Act.

As of February 2025, many draft boards lacked a quorum of three members, or lacked a members from each county over which a multi-county local board has jurisdiction, and thus would be unable to make decisions in the event of activation of a draft.

In late March or early April 2025 the Selective Service System suspended recruitment of new board members, saying that, "The Selective Service System is currently reviewing the structure and operations of the Board Member Program. As part of this reassessment, we are temporarily pausing the acceptance of new volunteer applications." Current board members continue to serve until their terms expire or they resign or die, but the number of boards that lack a quorum and would be unable to function in the event of a draft will grow with attrition as long as no new board members are being appointed.
