= Carmen Trotta =

American Catholic pacifist (born 1962)

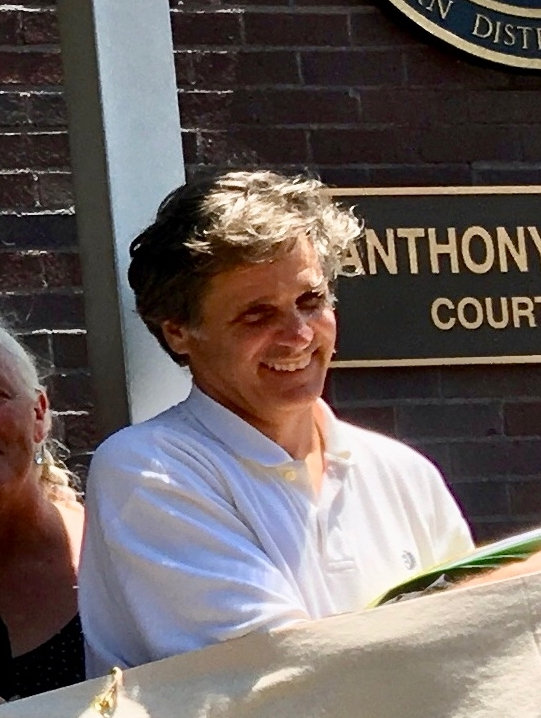
- Trotta in 2019
- Born: November 9, 1962 (age 63)
- Education: Grinnell College
- Occupation: Peace activist
- Employer: Catholic Worker
- Known for: The Kings Bay Plowshares 7

Carmen Trotta (born November 9, 1962) is an American pacifist and an activist in the Catholic Worker Movement, He has been an opponent of the war in Iraq. He has edited and written for The Catholic Worker, served on the executive committee of the War Resisters League, and was a founding member of Witness Against Torture, In 2018 he was one of the Kings Bay Plowshares 7, He has spent over 30 years as a member of the Maryhouse Catholic Worker and St. Joseph's House in the East Village of Manhattan, co-founded by Servant of God Dorothy Day and Peter Maurin in 1936.

== Education ==
Trotta graduated from Grinnell College in 1984, where he was a religious studies major. He played football, and was Morgan Taylor '26 Men's Senior Athlete of the Year.

== Pacifist and human rights actions ==
Trotta helped organize the April 20, 2002 March on Washington to oppose the war on terror. On May 30, 2008, he was sentenced to ten days in jail for protesting abuses at Guantanamo in front of the U.S Supreme Court. and as a member of that group, he was the first person arrested in the "100 Days Campaign" protest at the White House, against the prison at Guantanamo Bay Detention Camp.

== Kings Bay Plowshares ==
On April 4, 2018, he took part in the Kings Bay 7 Plowshares action. He and six other activists including Elizabeth McAlister, Martha Hennessy, Clare Grady, Patrick O'Neill, Steve Kelly SJ, and Mark Colville, entered the Kings Bay Naval Submarine Base to pray, string up crime tape, pour their own blood, and hammer on weapons to physically and symbolically enact beating swords into plowshares. He received a 14-month sentence at the Otisville federal correctional facility, but only served six months before receiving early release. Going to prison is part of the point for Plowshares activists, who believe, in the words of Philip Berrigan, that trial and incarceration "heighten the witness."

Americans need to investigate more deeply, of course, the value of prison witness. One person in prison for conscience speaks out more emphatically against the crimes of state than ten thousand would from the street who are educating for justice and peace. . . . [I]f the state is going to lock up some of its best citizens, what does that have to say about the state? That’s the value of the personal conscience, right from the early Christian times down through Gandhi and especially in this country. The prisoners of conscience in this country are perhaps the most notable in the world, and hopefully they will increase in number.
