= Molly Rush =

American activist

Molly Rush is an American Catholic anti-war, civil and women's rights activist born in 1935. She co-founded the Thomas Merton Center in Pittsburgh, Pennsylvania, along with Larry Kessler in 1972, She was one of the Plowshares eight defendants. They faced trial after an anti-nuclear weapons symbolic action at a nuclear missile plant in King of Prussia, Pennsylvania.

== Life and activism ==
Rush grew up in Pittsburgh and has been a member of civil rights organizations including the Catholic Interracial Council, Allegheny County Council on Civil Rights and National Organization for Women. She co-founded the Thomas Merton Peace & Justice Center in 1972. She participated in the first local Take Back the Night march to protest violence against women in 1976. Rush was a delegate to the National Women’s Conference in Houston in 1977.

=== Plowshares action ===
In 1980 Rush, with seven others, Daniel Berrigan, Phillip Berrigan, Carl Kabat, Elmer Maas, Anne Montgomery, John Schuchardt and Dean Hammer entered a GE plant that manufactured delivery systems for hydrogen bombs in King of Prussia, PA. The protesters then pounded on the cone of an Intercontinental ballistic missile (ICBM) warhead to protest the nuclear arms race. Rush and the other seven were arrested. Rush was in jail for 11 weeks until two Pittsburgh religious orders, the Sisters of Mercy and the Sister of St. Joseph, provided security for her bail. Convicted on all counts by the jury, she was sentenced to 2 to 5 years' imprisonment. Following a decade of appeals, in which the convictions were narrowly upheld but the sentences were overturned, Rush was re-sentenced to time served. In a film on the trial, In the King of Prussia, the defendants played themselves, while Martin Sheen portrayed the judge.

== Awards and recognition ==
She was named a Distinguished Daughter of Pennsylvania in 2011 by Governor Tom Corbett. and the Martin Luther King, Jr. Commemorative Coalition Award in 1990, Fannie Lou Hamer Award from Women for Racial & Economic Equality in 1994, the Mother Jones Award from the PA Labor History Society in 2003, the YWCA Tribute to Women award in 2003 and the Just Harvest Award in 2004.

=== Play ===
A play about her life, Molly's Hammer was written by Tammy Ryan and is based on the book Hammer of Justice: Molly Rush and Plowshares Eight by Liane Ellison Norman. Depicted in the play are the actions leading up to the 78 days Rush spent in Pennsylvania jails in 1980 as a result of her involvement in the Plowshares Eight's assault of a missile at General Electric Co. plant in King of Prussia, Pennsylvania. She shared a story from Hammer of Justice in the book ARISE AND WITNESS: Poems by Anne Montgomery, RSCJ, About Faith, Prison, War Zones and Nonviolent Resistance, published in 2024.

=== Film ===
Emile de Antonio's 1982 film In the King of Prussia, which starred Martin Sheen and Molly Rush appeared as herself. Rush was featured in the documentaries The Pursuit of Happiness and The Trial of the AVCO Plowshares, by Global Village Video.
