= Frida Berrigan =

American peace activist and author (b. 1974)

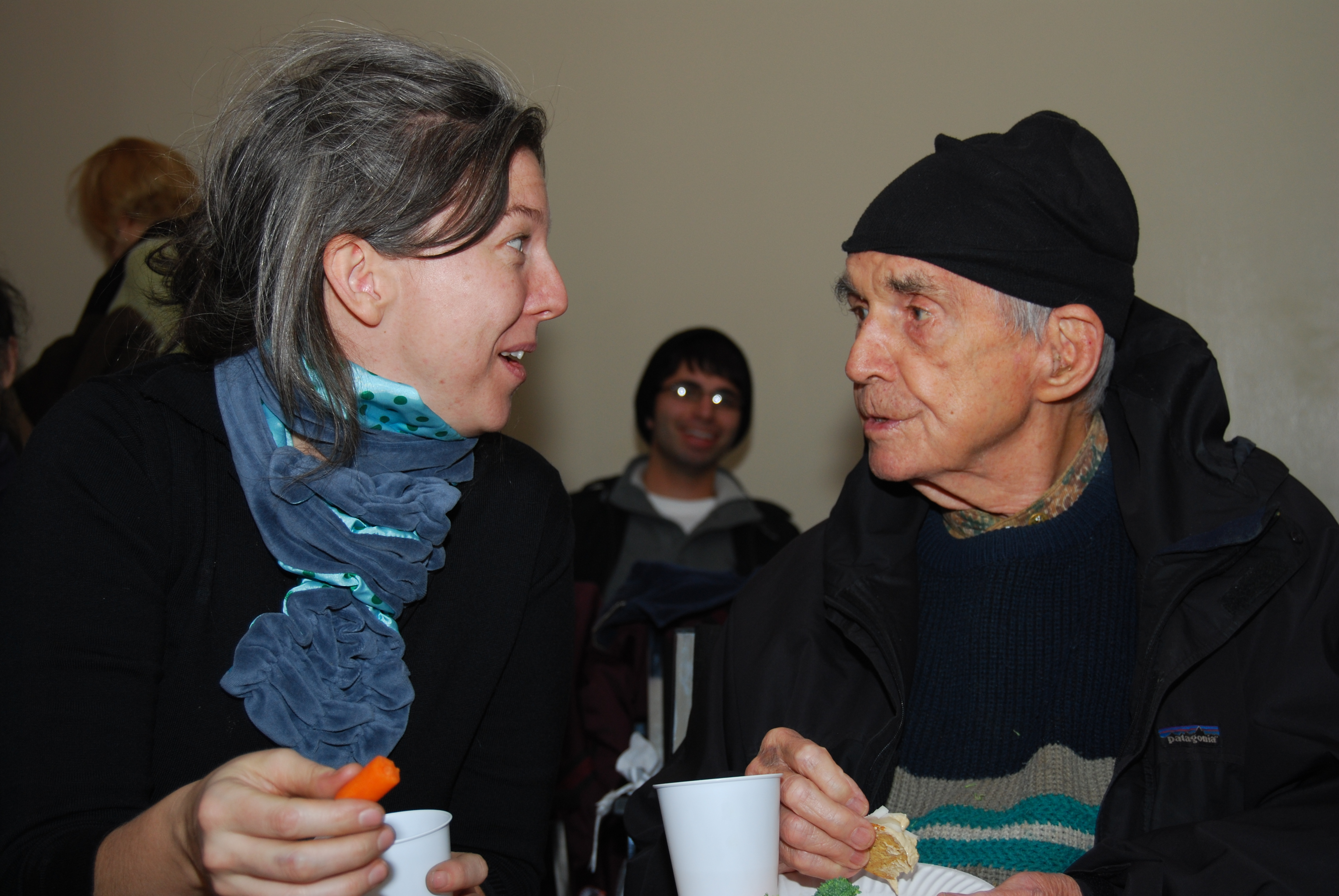
- With her uncle Daniel Berrigan SJ at a Witness Against Torture event, 2008

Personal life
- Born: April 1, 1974 (age 52) Baltimore, Maryland, U.S.

Religious life
- Religion: Roman Catholic, Unitarian

Frida Berrigan (born 1974) is an American peace activist and author. She published the 2015 book, It Runs in the Family: On Being Raised by Radicals and Growing into Rebellious Motherhood, about her life in a family of prominent activists and her own philosophies of parenting. Raised in the Plowshares movement, she has been featured in documentaries and studies of the movement, including award-winning director Susan Hagedorn's 2021 The Berrigans: Devout and Dangerous. Frida Berrigan has documented and interpreted the movement's history and meaning from her first-hand perspective for a global audience.

== Early life and education ==
Frida Berrigan, named for her paternal grandmother, was born on April 1, 1974, in Baltimore, Maryland to Elizabeth McAlister and Philip Berrigan, a former nun and priest turned radical Catholic peace activists. They lived in the Jonah House community, which they co-founded.

Her mother is most recently a member of the Kings Bay Plowshares 7, and her father co-established both the Catonsville Nine and the Plowshares movement. Frida is the older sister of Jerry and Kate Berrigan, and the niece of Jesuit peace activist Daniel Berrigan. In 1971, both Philip and Daniel made the cover of Time magazine as "rebel priests" while Philip was still in the Josephite order. Frida Berrigan has estimated that her parents spent 11 of their 29 years of marriage incarcerated for antiwar activities, which affected family life. In her memoir she recalls both parents accidentally being arrested at the same time when she was three and her brother just one; community members cared for the children. She was first arrested at age 8, during a protest at the US Capitol.

She attended the selective, majority-Black magnet Baltimore City College High School. She attended Hampshire College in Amherst, Massachusetts after receiving a scholarship that covered the majority of the costs; she covered the remaining $800 per semester herself by working at a food co-op. She graduated in 1997, while her father was in jail in Maine for the "Prince of Peace" Plowshares action at Bath Iron Works. In college she studied with Pakistani political scientist Eqbal Ahmed, and she worked for Frances Crowe at the American Friends Service Committee.

== Peace activism and political party ==
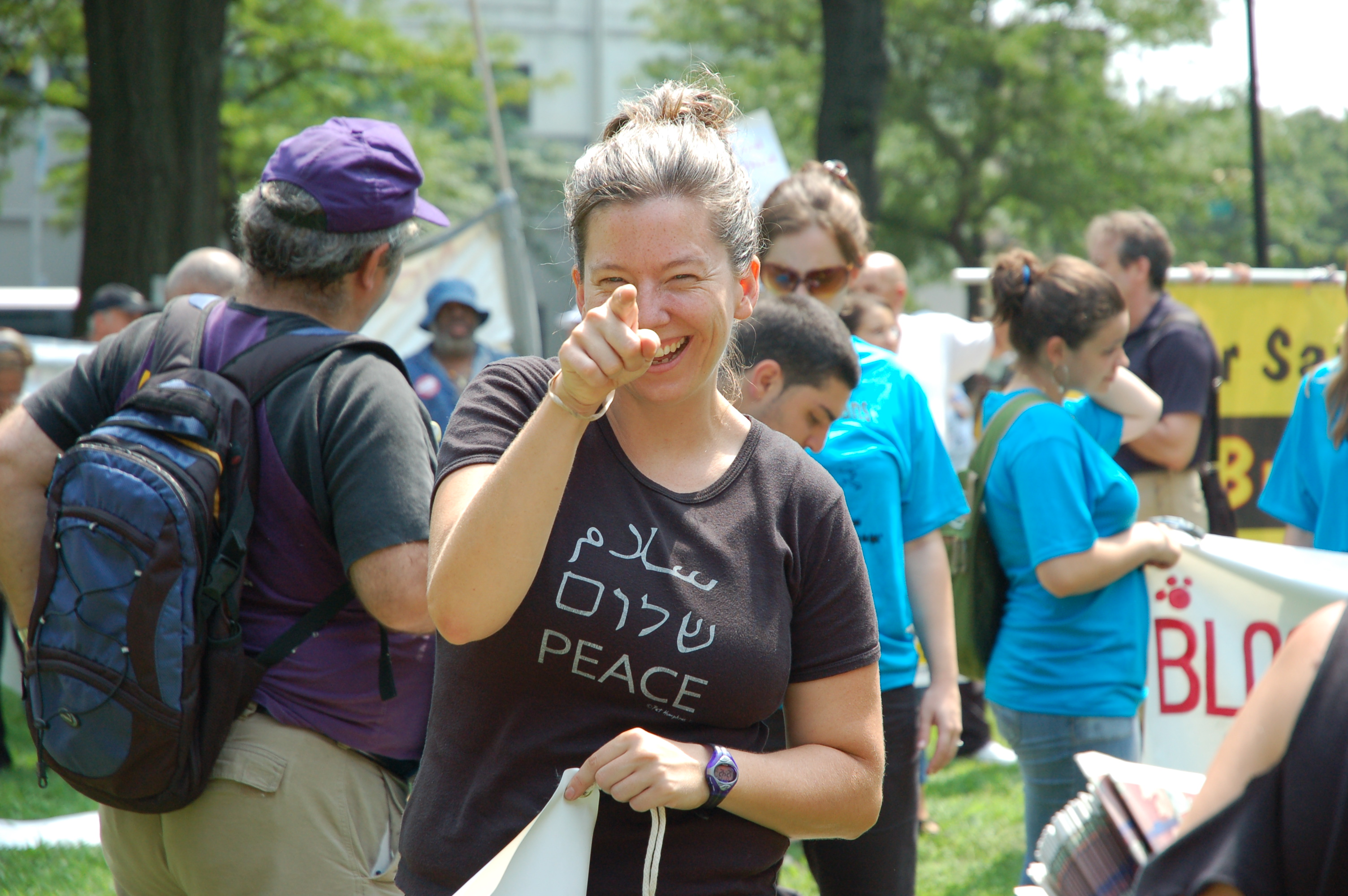
At an anti-war rally in Newark, New Jersey, 2007

Her first job after college was spending two years working for a Central America solidarity organization in Baltimore. She left to intern at The Nation in New York City, and write about military policy, nuclear weapons, and the arms trade for a think tank, the Arms and Security Initiative, a position she held until early 2010. She joined the World Policy Institute's Arms Trade Resource Center, led by William D. Hartung. In another Hartung endeavor, she was a senior program associate at the New America Foundation's Arms and Security Initiative, also at the World Policy Institute, prior to February 2010. She is on the board of the War Resisters League, a secular pacifist organization that marked its centennial in 2023, and serves as a member of its national committee.

In 2005 she cofounded Witness Against Torture with Matthew Daloisio and others, to work for the closure of the Guantánamo Bay detention center and end the US-backed use of torture. Berrigan is currently a columnist for Waging Nonviolence, and she has written columns and op-eds for The Day. She blurbed the book ARISE AND WITNESS: Poems by Anne Montgomery, RSCJ, About Faith, Prison, War Zones and Nonviolent Resistance, published in 2024.

She has been a mayoral candidate for the city of New London, Connecticut, running for the Green Party. Her platform focused on affordable home ownership, in conjunction with her role as a convener of the New London chapter of the Southeastern Connecticut Community Land Trust. She is also a member of the Connecticut Committee for the Prohibition of Nuclear Weapons. She teaches a first-year seminar at Connecticut College, focusing on disarmament. In 2016, Berrigan estimated she had been arrested around 20 times for activism-related reasons.

== Personal life ==
Prior to 2010, Berrigan lived in Redhook, Brooklyn, New York City. In 2010 she moved to the Maryhouse Catholic Worker in New York, where she lived until her marriage. Around the same time, she reconnected with Patrick Sheehan-Gaumer, also a member of the War Resisters League. The two began dating and married in June 2011 at All Souls Unitarian Universalist Congregation in New London, in order to meet Sheehan-Gaumer, an atheist, halfway on faith.

She lives in New London, Connecticut with her husband, a social worker who grew up in the same peace circles, and their three children. She categorizes herself as an urban farmer, and also a community activist. She does not consider herself a lapsed Catholic, but rather "a Catholic in waiting, waiting for my church to remember the Gospels, to be a justice and peace-seeking community, to be fully inclusive of women and to be welcoming to people who are not hetero-normative. Pope Francis is a step in the right direction, but there is a long way to go".
