= Megan Rice =

American activist (1930–2021)

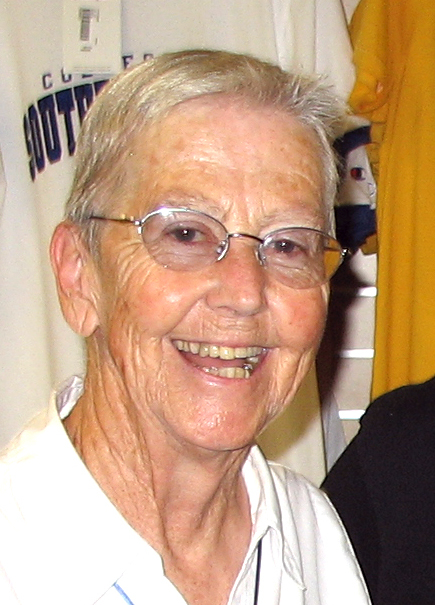
- Rice in 2008
- Born: Megan Gillespie Rice; January 31, 1930; Morningside Heights, New York, U.S.
- Died: October 10, 2021 (aged 91); Rosemont, Pennsylvania, U.S.
- Education: Fordham University; Villanova University (BS); Boston College (MS)
- Occupations: Nun, activist
- Known for: Illegally entering in 2012 at Y-12 National Nuclear Weapons Complex Y-12 in Oak Ridge, Tennessee

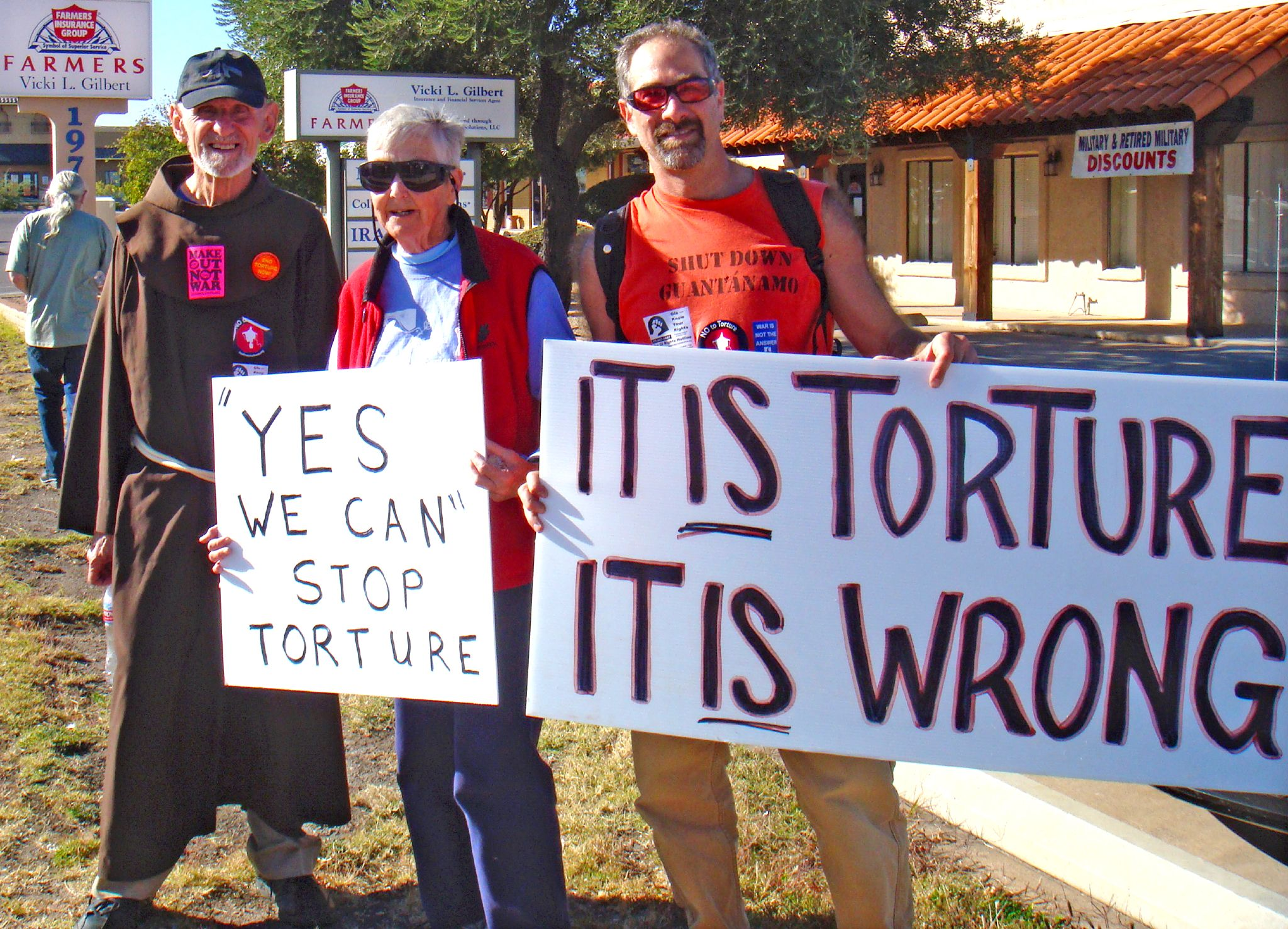
Fr. Louis Vitale, Sister Megan Rice and Jim Haber protest US policy on torture at Ft. Huachuca, Arizona where interrogation methods are taught to US military forces

Megan Gillespie Rice S.H.C.J. (Society of the Holy Child Jesus) (January 31, 1930 – October 10, 2021) was an American nuclear disarmament activist, Catholic nun, and former missionary. She was notable for illegally entering the Y-12 National Security Complex in Oak Ridge, Tennessee, at the age of 82, with two fellow activists of the Transform Now Plowshares group. The action was a nuclear disarmament protest referred to as "the biggest security breach in the history of the nation's atomic complex."

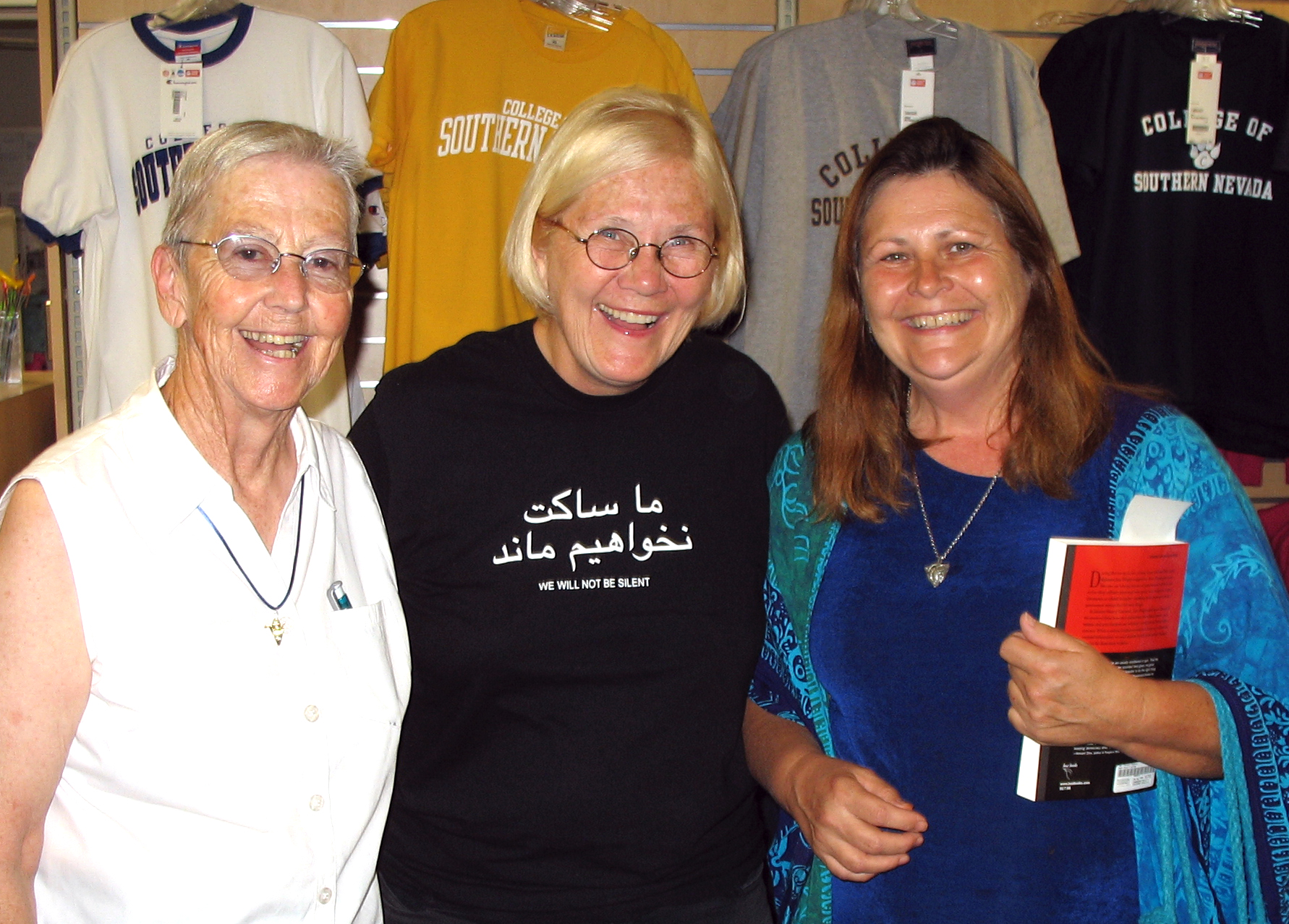
Megan Rice, Ann Wright (Col ret.) Candace Ross 2008 Las Vegas book release for Wright's book; Dissent Voices of Conscience

Rice was sentenced to almost three years in prison. In May 2015, the conviction for sabotage was vacated by a federal appeals court. The appeals court ruled that the prosecution failed to prove that Rice and the two others had the intention of causing injury to the national defense system. The lesser charge of injuring government property was upheld by the court but Rice was released within a week as the two years she had already served would be more than the re-sentencing for the upheld conviction.

== Early life and education ==
Rice, born January 31, 1930, was the youngest of three girls in a Catholic family of Irish descent, born and raised in the Morningside Heights neighborhood of New York City.

Her father, Frederick W. Rice, was an obstetrician-gynecologist who taught at New York University and treated patients at several New York City hospitals. Her mother, Madeleine Newman Hooke Rice, was a Barnard College graduate who undertook graduate studies at Columbia University while her children were growing up, obtaining a doctorate in history and writing a dissertation on Catholic views about slavery. Frederick and Madeleine Rice were active participants in the Catholic Worker movement and considered Dorothy Day a good friend.

Rice was educated in Catholic schools and joined the Sisters of the Holy Child Jesus at age 18. She was trained as an elementary school teacher and taught in the early grades in Mount Vernon, New York. Through part-time study at Fordham and Villanova Universities, she earned a bachelor's degree in biology from Villanova in 1957, then studied cellular biology at Boston College, where she received a master's degree. She then served various stints as a teacher in Nigeria and Ghana from 1962 to 2004.

== Anti-war, anti-nuclear weapons activism before 1980 - 2012 ==
In the 1980s Rice became engaged in the anti-war movement. She participated in protests against a variety of American military actions, military sites, and nuclear weapons installations. Rice was arrested more than three dozen times in acts of civil disobedience, including her anti-nuclear weapons activism.

=== Nevada Test Site and Creech Air Force Base ===
While serving as a staff member of Nevada Desert Experience in Las Vegas at the Nevada Test Site now known as the Nevada National Security Site, Rice participated in numerous antinuclear actions, and also participated in anti-drone warfare protests. On January 27, 2011, Rice was convicted of trespassing as the result of a protest against weaponized drones at Creech Air Force Base.

=== School of the Americas (SOA) ===
Rice was arrested in the 1990s at protests against torture at the US Army School of the Americas (now named Western Hemisphere Institute for Security Cooperation) at Fort Benning, Georgia. She served two six-month prison sentences resulting from trespasses during protests against the US Army School of the Americas in 1997–99.

=== Ft. Huachuca 2008 ===
==== Vandenberg Air Force Base protest of ICBM test launch. ====
August 2009, Megan Rice and Louie Vitale were arrested at Vandenberg Air Force Base protesting a test Minuteman III Intercontinental Ballistic missile (ICBM) launched approximately 4,000 miles to the Kwajalein Atoll in the Marshall Islands.

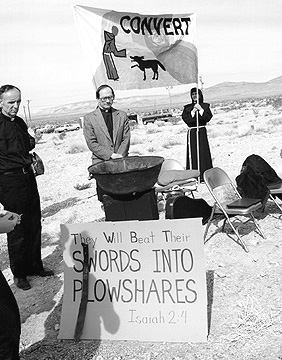
Members of Desert Lenten Experience hold a prayer vigil during the Easter period of 1982 at the entrance to the Nevada Test Site.

== Y-12 Oak Ridge National Security Complex Oak Ridge Tennessee ==
On July 28, 2012, Rice (age 82), and two fellow activists (Michael R. Walli (age 63) and Gregory I. Boertje-Obed (age 57)), entered the Y-12 National Security Complex in Oak Ridge, Tennessee, spray-painted antiwar slogans, and splashed blood on the outside of the heavily guarded Highly Enriched Uranium Materials Facility. The three were members of "Transform Now Plowshares", a part of the Plowshares Movement, which references the Book of Isaiah and Book of Micah's calls to "hammer their swords into plowshares", i.e., convert weapons into peaceful tools. Justifying their infiltration of the Oak Ridge facility, the trio cited both Biblical verses calling for world peace and the Treaty on the Non-Proliferation of Nuclear Weapons as justifications.The New York Times reported that nuclear weapons experts called this action "the biggest security breach in the history of the nation's atomic complex."

=== Trial ===
Rice, Walli, and Boertje-Obed were initially charged with misdemeanor trespass and "destruction and depredation" of government property (a felony) and faced up to a $100,000 fine and up to a year in prison. When they refused to plead guilty to those charges they were instead charged with violating the peacetime provision of the Sabotage Act, 18 U.S.C. § 2155(a), which Congress enacted during World War II, The Sabotage Act applies only if they acted "with intent to injure, interfere with, or obstruct the national defense," and authorizes a sentence of up to 20 years. They were also charged with causing more than $1,000 damage to government property, carrying up to 10 years in prison.

On May 9, 2013, the three were convicted. In her testimony Sister Rice said "I regret I didn't do this 70 years ago." Her sentencing was originally scheduled for January 28, 2014, but was postponed to February 18, 2014, due to a snow storm.

Although many news organizations called it a break-in, the team, including their lawyers, are clear that they walked in. Security failures and contractor ineptitude, not criminal know-how, put them next to the nation's uranium for its nuclear warheads.

=== Appeal ===
On May 8, 2015, a 2–1 decision in the United States Court of Appeals for the Sixth Circuit found that the trio lacked the necessary intent for the sabotage conviction and overturned it for all three of them. Part of the court ruling read "But vague platitudes about a facility's 'crucial role in the national defense' are not enough to convict a defendant of sabotage." The lesser charge of injuring government property was upheld however, and the court ordered re-sentencing based on that conviction. They were released from prison on May 16 under an emergency release petition (unopposed by the prosecution), on the grounds that the normal period for re-sentencing would take several weeks and the new sentences for the upheld conviction would probably be shorter than the two years they had already served.

Megan Rice was released from prison May 2015.

Rice became so known for her activism that the United States Department of Energy funded an oral history, to help understand her nuclear disarmament views.

== Media ==
=== Films ===
- Good Thinking, Those Who've Tried to Halt Nuclear Weapons (2015). Directed by Anthony Donovan. Sr. Megan Rice was interviewed for this award-winning work in early 2013.
- The Nuns, The Priests, and The Bombs (2017). This film by Emmy award-winning producer Helen Young opens with the Oak Ridge action and then covers earlier Plowshares activists who entered Trident nuclear submarine Naval Base Kitsap-Bangor, near Seattle, Washington. The actions of Bill "Bix" Bichsel, Susan Crane, Steve Kelly, Lynne Greenwald and Anne Montgomery inspired Rice.

=== Books ===
- Transform Now Plowshares: Megan Rice, Gregory Boertje-Obed, and Michael Walli (2022). In early 2017 Carole Sargent, a Georgetown University scholar focusing on Catholic sisters who are peace activists and serve prison time, took on a project that was already underway. She knew Sister Rice personally through the Catholic Worker circle when she helped the RSCJ open Anne Montgomery House. At Sister Rice's request she expanded the book to include Gregory Boertje-Obed, Michael Walli, and Plowshares more fully. It will be available by advance order in late 2021, with a copyright date of early 2022. (To clarify any confusion, this book was originally announced in 2014 with a different author and title, focusing on Sister Rice only.)
- Activist: Portraits of Courage (2019). This book by KK Ottesen contains profiles of over forty activists from Sister Megan Rice to Senator Bernie Sanders and Grover Norquist to Dolores Huerta, and recounts the experiences that began their journeys.
- Almighty: Courage, Resistance, and Existential Peril in the Nuclear Age (2016). Dan Zak was assigned by The Washington Post to cover the 2012 break-in of the Y-12 National Security Complex in Oak Ridge. In 2016 Zak published his account of the events and the trial in Almighty.
