= Susan Crane =

Susan Crane may refer to:

- Sue Miles (1944–2010), née Crane, Anglo-American counter-culture activist and restaurateur
- Susan Crane (peace activist) (born c.1943)
