= SP4 =

SP4 may refer to:

- SP4, an album by Sneaker Pimps
- Sp4 transcription factor, a human gene
- Savoia-Pomilio SP.4, a reconnaissance and bomber aircraft built in Italy during the First World War
- The Saint Patrick's Day Four
- Service pack 4 in computing
- Specialist Four (incorrectly called Specialist 4th class), a former enlisted rank of the U.S. Army, now simply Specialist
- A model of steam toy made by British manufacturer Mamod
- a 7.62×41mm silent pistol cartridge
- Surface Pro 4, a laplet by Microsoft
