= Martin Stolar =

American attorney and civil rights activist (1943–2024)

- Born: Martin Robert Stollar; April 2, 1943; Syracuse, New York
- Died: July 1, 2024 (aged 81); New York City, U.S.
- Education: University of Rochester (BA); New York University School of Law (JD)
- Occupation(s): Attorney, civil rights activist
- Spouse: Elsie Chandler
- Children: 2

Martin Stolar (April 2, 1943 – July 1, 2024) was a prominent American civil rights attorney and movement lawyer in New York City. He was best known for representing anti-Vietnam war protesters, Black Panthers, Attica prisoners and members of Occupy Wall Street among many others.

== Early life ==
Stolar was the middle son of Sig Stolar and Jesse (Staum) Stolar and was raised in Rochester, New York. He was a member of the Boy Scouts. Stolar graduated from the University of Rochester in 1965 and took a summer job with a Bronx storefront lawyer. He then enrolled at New York University School of Law and graduated in 1968.

== Civil rights career ==
=== VISTA (1968–1969) ===
After law school, Stolar joined VISTA. His training took place in Chicago during the summer of 1968. He credits witnessing the police violence at the Democratic National Convention as a radicalizing moment.

He was assigned to work in Columbus, Ohio for VISTA. In order to practice law he had to apply to be admitted to the Ohio Bar. He provided all the information from the New York Bar but refused to answer questions such as listing every organizations he was or had been a member as he believed it infringed on his First and Fifth Amendment rights. The Ohio Bar refused him and that decision was upheld by the Supreme Court of Ohio. Stolar took the case to the Supreme Court of the United States, which heard In re Stolar where the Court decided in his favor, by a 5–4 decision, stating the First Amendment prohibits Ohio from penalizing a person solely because they are a member of a particular organization.

=== Bedford-Stuyvesant Legal Services (1969) ===
After Vista, Stolar was awarded a Reginald Heber Smith Community Law Fellowship to work at Bedford-Stuyvesant Legal Services in Brooklyn.

=== New York Law Commune (1970–1973) ===
The New York Law Commune made decisions collectively and paid members, including clerical workers, according to their needs. Stolar join the commune in 1970. He started doing nonprofit and corporate legal work for movement organizations such as Liberation News Service, Third World Newsreel, and Clergy and Laity Concerned.

==== The Camden 28 ====
He transitioned to taking more criminal cases. Stolar, along with David Kairys and Carl Broege, represented The Camden 28. His clients were a group of church-based resisters who broke into a draft board in Camden, New Jersey as an act of conscientious objection to the Vietnam War. The jury found them all not guilty and the verdict was seen as an example of jury nullification. Supreme Court Justice William Brennan called the trial, "one of the great trials of the 20th century".

==== The Panther 21 ====
The commune also represented the Panther 21. They were a group of twenty-one Black Panther members who were arrested and accused of planned coordinated bombing and long-range rifle attacks on two police stations and an education office in New York City in 1969. At the time, the eight-month trial was the longest and most expensive in New York State history. All the clients were acquitted.

==== Handschu ====
Following information learned about the spying tactics used against the Black Panthers, Stolar and Jethro Eisenstein strategized on a class action lawsuit against the New York City Police Department (NYPD). They represented Barbara Handschu and fifteen other plaintiffs. The lawsuit claimed that "informers and infiltrators provoked, solicited and induced members of lawful political and social groups to engage in unlawful activities"; that files were maintained with respect to "persons, places, and activities entirely unrelated to legitimate law enforcement purposes, such as those attending meetings of lawful organizations"; and that information from these files was made available to academic institutions, prospective employers, licensing agencies and others. In addition, plaintiffs protested seven types of police misconduct: (1) the use of informers; (2) infiltration; (3) interrogation; (4) overt surveillance; (5) summary punishment; (6) intelligence gathering; and (7) electronic surveillance, and alleged that these police practices which punished and repressed lawful dissent had had a "chilling effect" upon the exercise of freedom of speech, assembly and association, that they violated constitutional prohibitions against unreasonable searches and seizures, and that they abridged rights of privacy and due process.

After a decade of litigation, the federal court found in 1985 that police surveillance of political activity violated constitutional protections of free speech. This ruling resulted in a consent decree which put in numerous restrictions how the NYPD may use surveillance and informants on political, ideological or religious activities.

==== Attica ====
After the Attica Prison Rebellion in 1971, Stolar was a key architect of the Attica Brothers Legal Defense through the New York City chapter of the National Lawyers Guild.

=== Solo practice (1989–2024) ===
During the 2004 Republican National Convention in New York City there were 1,800 protestors arrested. Stolar led the mass defense committee of the National Lawyers Guild in defending the protestors and personally handed more than 250 cases.

The process used during the mass detention at the Republican Convention were then replicated later for Occupy Wall Street and Black Lives Matter.

== Personal life ==
Stolar had two daughters with his long-term partner Veronika Kraft. They were together from law school until Kraft's death in 1986. He married Elsie Chandler, a criminal defense lawyer at Neighborhood Defender Service of Harlem, in 1993. They remained married until his death.
