= The Camden 28 =

Anti-Vietnam War activists who raided a draft office in New Jersey

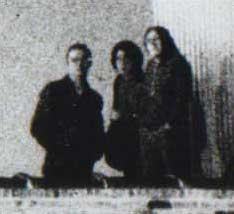
- FBI surveillance photo of three of the Camden 28 outside the draft board offices in the morning hours of August 22, 1971
- Dates active: 1971
- Active regions: Camden, New Jersey, United States
- Ideology: Anti-war; Catholic; Leftism
- Size: 28
- Wars: the Opposition to the Vietnam War

The Camden 28 were a group of leftist, Catholic, anti-Vietnam War activists who in 1971 planned and executed a raid on a draft board in Camden, New Jersey, United States. The raid resulted in a high-profile criminal trial of the activists that was seen by many as a referendum on the Vietnam War and as an example of jury nullification.

Supreme Court Justice William J. Brennan Jr. called the trial "one of the great trials of the 20th century".

== The goal ==
The goal of the group was to oppose the war in Vietnam by sabotage. They planned to break into the draft board offices at night, search for, collect, and either destroy or remove the records of all Class 1-A status draft registrants.

They wrote in a statement before trial:

We are twenty-eight men and women who, together with other resisters across the country, are trying with our lives to say "no" to the madness we see perpetrated by our government in the name of the American people – the madness of our Vietnam policy, of the arms race, of our neglected cities and inhuman prisons. We do not believe that it is criminal to destroy pieces of paper which are used to bind men to involuntary servitude, which train these men to kill, and which send them to possibly die in an unjust, immoral, and illegal war. We stand for life and freedom and the building of communities of true friendship. We will continue to speak out and act for peace and justice, knowing that our spirit of resistance cannot be jailed or broken.

== The group ==
The mostly Catholic group included four Catholic priests and a Lutheran minister, people working in education or legal and social services, veterans, and middle-aged parents. One notable member was Frank Pommersheim. Two members of the Citizens' Commission to Investigate the FBI were also involved.

== Informant ==
Bob Hardy was opposed to the war but was also secretly opposed to the group's plans to break the law with this action. Feeling torn between loyalty to his friends in the group and his strict law-and-order personal philosophy, Hardy approached the local FBI with his concerns. The FBI encouraged Hardy to remain with the group so that he could pass along information about their activities. Hardy agreed to become an informant, allegedly only after receiving assurances from his FBI handlers that none of the group would ever spend any time in jail for the raid against the draft board. Hardy claimed that the FBI had financed a significant portion of Hardy's role within the group, providing details of building plans, break-in methods and the funding for the vehicles and equipment used in the raid.

As an FBI informant, Hardy, a carpenter by trade, became heavily involved with the group from a planning and training perspective. He supplied tools (mostly paid for by the FBI), expertise and training. Ladders would be used, windows would be cut with glass cutters, alarms would be bypassed, etc. Two-way radios were supplied by the FBI so that the activists could better communicate and coordinate their actions when the raid was to finally occur.

Hardy also attempted to provide Kevin Forsyth with a gun.

== Raid ==
As planned, the raid took place in the early hours of Sunday, August 22, 1971, with all of the activists in their positions as the raid commenced. Unknown to the activists, the raid was being monitored and documented by more than 40 FBI agents, who held back and watched as the activists broke into the draft board office and commenced destroying thousands of draft-related documents, with a focus on the records of individuals with draft status 1-A, which would make them fully eligible for military service. After enough time passed, the hidden FBI agents arrested everyone involved. Those arrested, including four Catholic priests and a Lutheran minister, became known as the Camden 28. The fact that Bob Hardy had betrayed the activists became readily apparent as the night wore on.

== Trial ==
By the time that the Camden 28 were brought to trial in the Spring of 1973, their case was viewed by many as a referendum on the Vietnam War. Each of the 28 faced seven felony charges stemming from the raid and could have faced more than 40 years in prison if convicted. After rejecting a deal in which they would plead guilty to a misdemeanor, the 28 chose to be tried together.

They were represented by Martin Stolar of the New York Law Commune, David Kairys and Carl Broege. They also represented themselves. Psychiatrist Robert Jay Lifton testified for the defense. Howard Zinn testified and recommended civil disobedience and jury nullification.

One of the 28, sociologist John Peter Grady, explicitly asked the jury to "ignore the law." He compared their actions to the Greenwich Tea Party of 1774 and the actions of Rosa Parks refusing to sit in the back of the bus.

Immediately prior to the trial they were offered a plea-bargain whereby they would each plead guilty to a single misdemeanor charge and the rest of the charges would be dropped. After intense discussion the 28 decided that they would not take the plea and that as political activists they preferred to be put on trial. Historian Howard Zinn was brought in to testify on behalf of the defendants.

Witness for the prosecution Bob Hardy had begun having second thoughts, and felt betrayed by the government. Hardy maintained that from the start of his interaction with the FBI he sought and received assurances that none of his co-conspirators in the raid would see any jail time. Now, as the trial loomed ahead, each of the "28" was facing more than 40 years in prison.

For the FBI and the prosecution, the cost of betraying Hardy in this fashion was to lose him as a friendly witness. Scorned, Hardy would now, in fact, testify extensively for the defense. Hardy would testify regarding the extent to which the FBI encouraged and enabled the raid on the draft board to take place. Through Hardy's testimony, the raid came across as being funded and driven by the FBI, and the defense was able to argue effectively that through the FBI, the government "over-reached" in its zeal to arrest and prosecute this particular set of anti-war activists.

Additionally, it became apparent that the FBI had enabled the plot to form and develop because it believed the Camden group might have been connected to the theft and publication of FBI documents in Media, Pennsylvania, several months prior. At least two of the Camden defendants (Keith Forsyth and Robert Williamson) had been involved in the Media burglary, though this was not revealed until they stepped forward in 2014. Those documents had revealed the COINTELPRO program, and the Camden defendants essentially used their own trial to publicize and question FBI methods.

When the trial went to the jury on May 18, 1973, the judge Clarkson S. Fisher instructed the jury that they could acquit based on entrapment if the government overreach was "so fundamentally unfair as to be offensive to the basic standards of decency and shocking to the universal sense of justice." On May 20, 1973, the jury returned "not guilty" verdicts for all counts against all 28 defendants. According to the jury foreman, “Hardy was the key, but I don't think anybody on the jury wanted the war to continue.” After the verdict was read, the defendants and 200 supporters sang Amazing Grace.

== Documentary ==
A 2007 documentary film, The Camden 28, has been researched, produced and released by Anthony Giacchino, combining archival footage, contemporary photographs, extensive interviews and analysis into the most comprehensive account of the people, events and history surrounding the Camden 28. The Camden 28 aired in September 2007 on PBS's P.O.V. independent documentary showcase. One of the lead defense attorneys at the trial, David Kairys, included an extensive account of the case in his memoir.

== Aftermath and legacy ==
Supreme Court Justice William Brennan called the trial, "one of the great trials of the 20th century".

Analyzing the impact of the verdict in the Camden 28 trial in the context of contemporary events, Rick Perlstein wrote that the acquittal, on the basis of the plot being instigated by an agent provocateur, was "quietly devastating to the moral excuses of Watergate malefactors" because they had used the threat of political violence as a justification for their unlawful activities, and now appeared to be manufacturing it.

Father Michael Doyle, one of the 28 who was a Catholic parochial vicar in Camden at the time, remained a priest and community leader there until his death in 2022. Sacred Heart Church, which Doyle led until his retirement, continues to campaign for peace, equality, and social justice and holds an annual Peace Gathering.

John Grady's daughters Theresa and Clare Grady were half of the Saint Patrick's Day Four and were convicted of misdemeanor property damage charges for pouring their own blood on a military recruitment station in Lansing, New York three days before the 2003 invasion of Iraq.

In 2018, four members of the Camden 28 reunited with David Kairys and Anthony Giacchino at Camden County College for a panel event that was broadcast on PBS television.

In 2021, a documentary short film about Father Michael Doyle premiered at the New Jersey Film Festival.

== See also ==
- 1971 May Day Protests
- Catholic Worker Movement
- The Saint Patrick's Day Four
- Chicago Seven
- Harrisburg Seven
- Gainesville Eight
- Catonsville Nine
- Milwaukee Fourteen
- Chicano Moratorium
- Christian left
- Lists of protests against the Vietnam War § 1970
