= Mark Colville =

Mark Colville may refer to:

- Mark Colville (activist), American social justice activist and Catholic worker
- Mark Colville, 4th Viscount Colville of Culross, British judge and politician
