= Thomas Merton Center (Pittsburgh) =

US non-profit organization

The Thomas Merton Center was a non-profit grassroots organization in Pittsburgh with a mission to build and support collaborative movements that empower marginalized populations to advance collective liberation from oppressive systems.

The center was co-founded by Molly Rush and Larry Kessler in 1972. The Thomas Merton Center was named after Thomas Merton, a Trappist monk of the Abbey of Gethsemani who wrote prolifically about issues related to peace and justice.

The Center ceased operations in 2024 due to budgetary constraints, although a consignment store associated with it remained open.

== History ==
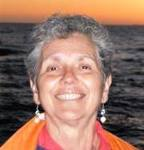
Molly Rush, co-founder of the Thomas Merton Center

The traditional base of the center was radical Catholic pacifists, but has since expanded to secular humanists and diverse community perspectives concerned with building a more peaceful and just world. The center began in 1972 to protest the continuation of the Vietnam War, to work against federal cutbacks and to raise money to provide medical aid to Indochina.

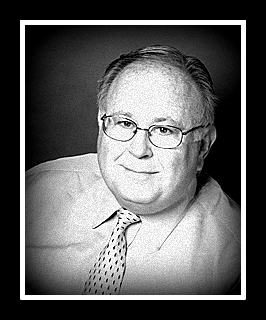
Larry Kessler, co-founder of the Thomas Merton Center

The center has also protested and peacefully demonstrated against a variety of issues including world and local hunger, exploitation of workers, militarism, and racial discrimination.

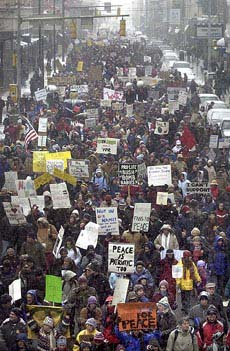
Rally in 2003 to end the war in Iraq

During the 1980s, the Center worked extensively on nuclear disarmament, targeting local weapons makers Rockwell and Westinghouse, as well as organizing campaigns of solidarity and support to the people of Central and Latin American countries that were targeted by the Reagan administration. In the 1990s, organizing against the Gulf War and in response to the murder of Johnny Gammage by police, among other projects, were undertaken. With the invasion of Iraq in 2003, the Center became central in organizing Pittsburgh's large anti-war protests and most recently served to facilitate and organize many of the educational and protest activities in September 2009 against and in response to the G20 Summit, including the Peoples' March, which was one of the largest protests in Pittsburgh in decades. Several local institutions grew out of the center, including the Pittsburgh chapter of Amnesty International and the Greater Pittsburgh Community Food Bank. A 2015 journal article stated that it hosted or provided resources to around 25 local campaigns and projects, including the Raging Grannies and Code Pink; and counted a number of other groups as "friends and affiliates," including the Pittsburgh Organizing Group and the Pittsburgh Independent Media Center.

The TMC was monitored by the FBI's Joint Terrorism Task Force between 2002 and 2005, according to documents obtained by the ACLU through a Freedom of Information Act request in 2006.

== Structure ==
Its structure included a Board of Directors, committees, affiliates, friends, projects, and members. Membership dues and donations provide much of the funding and the Board of Directors are elected to make decisions related to governance of policies at the center. Several of the most active projects included Book 'Em, a books for prisoners program; the Environmental Justice Committee, the Pittsburgh Darfur Coalition, Haiti Solidarity, the Pittsburgh Chapter of Code Pink, Roots of Promise, Marcellus Protest Group, Fed Up! the Pittsburgh chapter of the Human Rights Coalition, and The East End Community Thrift Shop, which provides clothing and household items for low-income individuals in the area.

The Thomas Merton Center had four key focus areas: peace and non-violence; human rights; environmental justice; and economic justice. The Thomas Merton Center also acted as a fiscal umbrella for a number of smaller organizations that aligned with the peace and justice mission of the center. These include: the Pittsburgh Prison Book Project (formerly Book 'Em), Haiti Solidarity, Pittsburgh Progressive Notebook, Fight for Lifers West, Human Rights Coalition Fed' Up, Pittsburgh Darfur Coalition, Roots of Promise, Marcellus Protest Group, and Westmoreland Marcellus Protest Group.

== Publication ==
The Thomas Merton Center published a monthly newspaper entitled The New People. It reported on issues of war, poverty, racism and oppression, by focusing on the non-violent struggle to bring about a more peaceful and just world. The New People also acted as an organizing tool for Thomas Merton Center members and the activist community.

== Award ==
Beginning in 1972, the Center gave the Thomas Merton Award to "national and international individuals struggling for justice."

=== Award recipients ===
1972: James P. Carroll
1973: Dorothy Day
1974: Dick Gregory
1975: Joan Baez
1976: Dom Hélder Câmara
1977: Dick Hughes
1978: Bishop John Harris Burt & Bishop James Malone
1979: Helen Caldicott
1980: William Winpisinger
1981: The people of Poland
1982: Archbishop Raymond Hunthausen
1983: Not awarded
1984: Bernice Johnson Reagon
1985: Henri Nouwen
1986: Allan Boesak
1987: Miguel D'Escoto
1988: Daniel Berrigan
1989: Comrades of El Salvador & Elisabeth Linder
1990: Marian Wright Edelman
1991: Howard Zinn
1992: Molly Rush
1993: Reverend Lucius Walker
1994: Richard Rohr OFM
1995: Marian Kramer
1996: Winona LaDuke
1997: Ron Chisom
1998: Studs Terkel
1999: Wendell Berry
2000: Ronald V. Dellums
2001: Sister Joan Chittister
2002: Bishop Leontine T. Kelly
2003: Voices in the Wilderness
2004: Amy Goodman and Stephen Bluestone for poetry category
2005: Reverend Roy Bourgeois
2006: Angela Davis
2007: Cindy Sheehan
2008: Malik Rahim
2009: Dennis Kucinich
2010: Noam Chomsky
2011: Vandana Shiva
2012: Martin Sheen
2013: Bill McKibben
2014: Jeremy Scahill
2015: Barbara Lee
2016: Frida Berrigan
2017: The Center for Constitutional Rights
2018: ArchCity Defenders
2019: Keeanga-Yamahtta Taylor
