= Frank Pommersheim =

American legal scholar (born 1943)

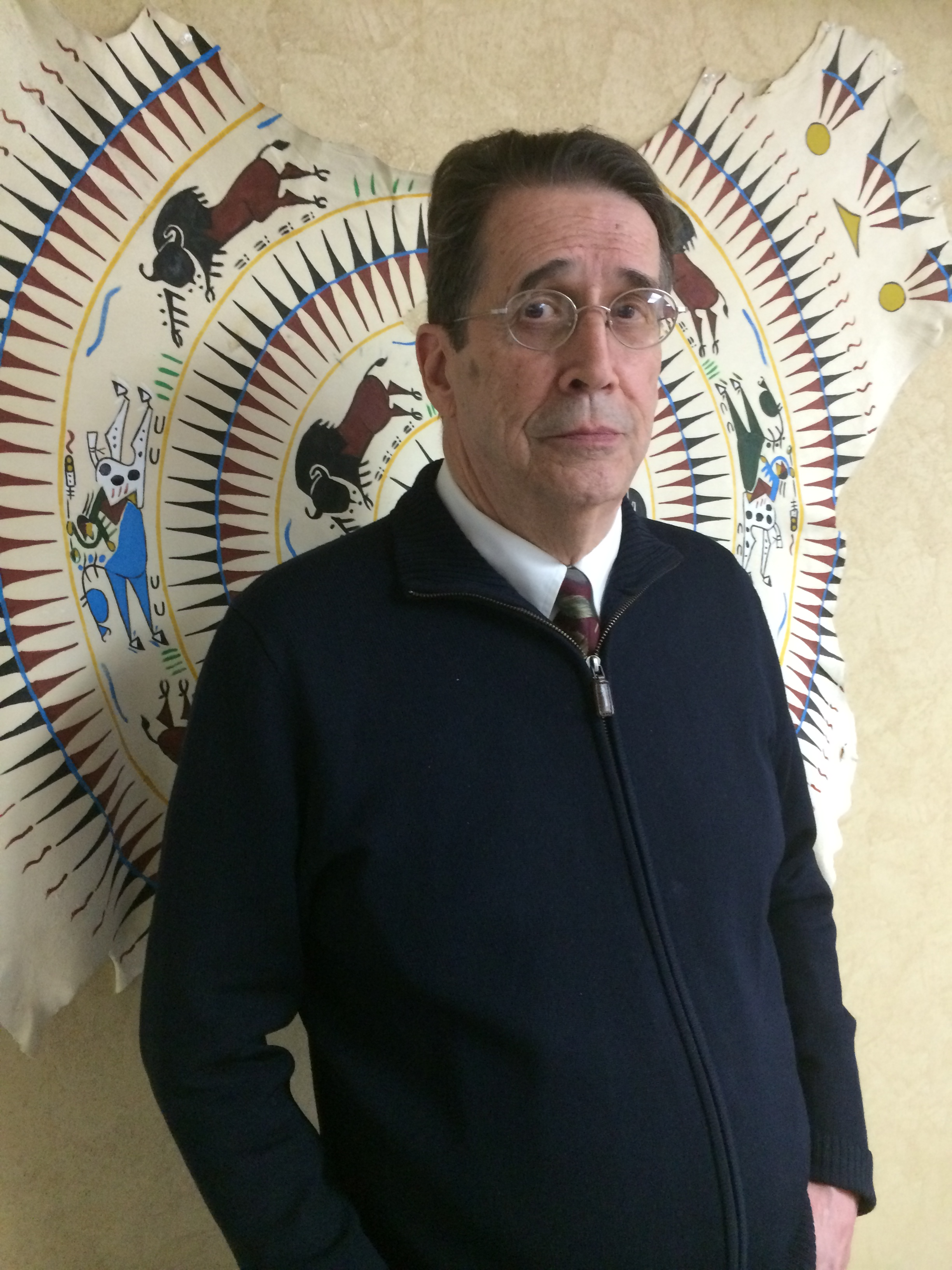
- Born: 12 December 1943 (age 82); Queens, New York, U.S.
- Occupations: Attorney; Professor; Author
- Known for: The Camden 28

Academic background
- Education: Columbia Law School; Harvard University; Colgate University

Academic work
- Discipline: American Indian Law
- Institutions: University of South Dakota School of Law

Frank Pommersheim (born December 12, 1943) is an American professor, author, and poet specializing in the field of American Indian law. Pommersheim is serving on several tribal appellate courts and serves as the Chief Justice for the Cheyenne River Sioux Tribal Court of Appeals and the Rosebud Sioux Supreme Court and is also notable for his involvement in The Camden 28.

== Early life and education ==
Frank Pommersheim was born in New York City but moved to the Rosebud Sioux Reservation in 1974 where he worked for 10 years before joining the University of South Dakota faculty in 1984. Pommersheim graduated in 1965 with a Bachelor of Arts from Colgate University. He earned a J.D. from Columbia Law School in 1968 and a MPA from Harvard University.

Pommersheim was employed as the Director of Dakota Plains Legal Service from 1980 to 1983. As a Senior Consumer Law Specialist for the New York City Department of Consumer Affairs from 1971 to 1973 and as an Attorney and Volunteer Leader for the VISTA program in Alaska from 1968 to 1970.

== Career ==
Frank Pommersheim began teaching at the University of South Dakota School of Law in 1984 where he is currently a professor specializing in American Indian law. Pommersheim has also taught at the Lewis & Clark Law School, University of Tulsa College of Law, College of Law in Dublin, Ireland, Sinte Gleska University, and the University of New Mexico.

Pommersheim serves on tribal appellate courts and is currently the Chief Justice for the Cheyenne River Sioux Tribal Court of Appeals as well as Associate Justice for the Rosebud Sioux Supreme Court.

=== Awards ===
University of South Dakota Belbas‐Larson Award for Excellence in Teaching, South Dakota Peace and Justice Center Reconciliation Award, and the John Wesley Jackson Award as the Outstanding Professor of Law.

== Involvement in the Camden 28 ==
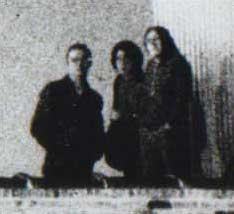
FBI surveillance photo of three of the Camden 28 outside the draft board offices in the morning hours of August 22, 1971.

The Camden 28 were an eclectic group of anti-Vietnam War activists. The group included young students, blue-collar workers, four Catholic priests and a Protestant minister. In 1971 they raided a Camden, New Jersey draft board and destroyed records containing Class 1-A status draft registrants. Pommersheim, who was appropriately 28 at the time, was a member of this group's anti-Vietnam War activists. The group faced felony charges for their actions, but subsequently were acquitted by a jury in 1973. The high-profile trial against the activists that was seen by many as a referendum on the Vietnam War and as an example of successful use of jury nullification. In 2007, PBS produced The Camden 28, a documentary on the event and the events surrounding it. Howard Zinn testified at the trial and Supreme Court Justice William Brennan called it "one of the great trials of the 20th century".

== Personal life ==
Frank married a fellow member of the Camden 28, Anne Dunham. The couple left the East coast and lived and worked on the Rosebud Indian Reservation in South Dakota for 10 years. Anne and Frank later moved to Vermillion, South Dakota. They have three children. Pommersheim is personal friends with Bob Dylan and a passionate fan of folk music.

== Books ==
- Broken Landscape: Indians, Indian Tribes and the Constitution (Oxford University Press, 2009)
- Felix Cohen's Handbook of Federal Indian Law (contributor) (2005 edition)
- Braid of Feathers: American Indian Law and Contemporary Tribal Life (University of California Press, 1995)
- Reservation Street Law (with Anita Remerowski) (Sinte Gleska College Press, 1979)
- Broken Ground and Flowing Waters: An Introductory Text on Rosebud Sioux Tribal Government (Sinte Gleska College Press, 1977)

== Poetry ==
- Small is Beautiful: The Buddha Correspondence (Rose Hill Books, 2011)
- East of the River: Poems Both Ancient and New (Rose Hills Books, 2008)
- Haiku for the Birds (Rose Hill Books, 2002)
- Mindfulness and Home: Poetry and Prose from a Prairie Landscape (Rose Hill Books, 1997)
- Snaps: Poetry and Prose from a Family Album (Rose Hill Books, 1994)

== See also ==
- The Camden 28
- The Camden 28 (film)
