= Kairys =

- Lithuanian surname
- m.: Kairys
- f.: (unmarried): Kairytė
- f.: (married): Kairienė
- Origin: literally:"leftie"

Kairys is a Lithuanian language family name.

The surname may refer to:

- Jurgis Kairys (born 1952), Lithuanian aerobatic pilot and aeronautical engineer
- David Kairys (born 1943), American professor of Law
- Steponas Kairys, Lithuanian engineer and politician
- Donaldas Kairys, Lithuanian basketball player
