= Elizabeth McAlister =

American peace activist and former nun

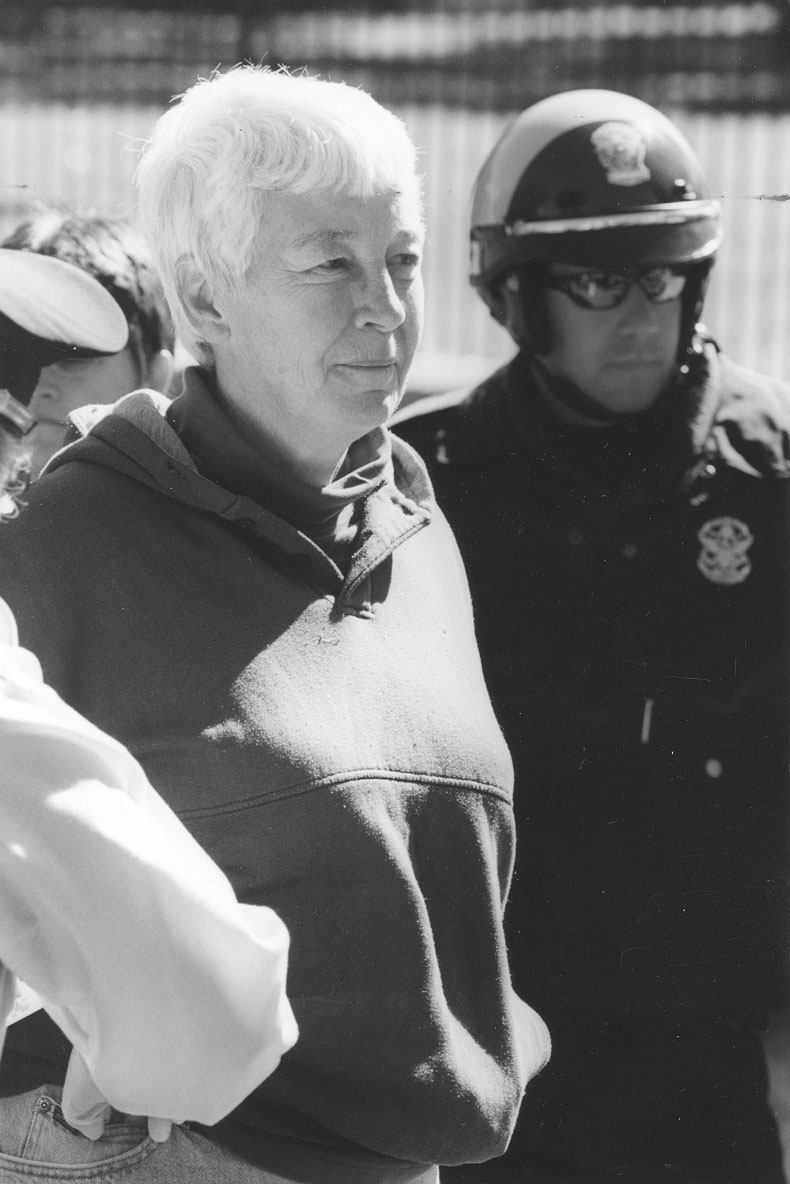
- McAlister under arrest at a protest in 2001
- Born: Maureen McAlister; November 17, 1939 (age 86); Montclair, New Jersey, U.S.
- Education: Marymount College, Tarrytown; Hunter College
- Occupations: Former nun, peace activist
- Known for: Harrisburg Seven, Jonah House Kings Bay Trident
- Spouse: Philip Berrigan (m. 1973; died 2002)
- Children: 3

Elizabeth McAlister (born November 17, 1939) is an American peace activist and former nun of the Religious of the Sacred Heart of Mary. She married Philip Berrigan and was excommunicated from the Catholic Church. McAlister served prison time for nonviolent acts of civil disobedience.

== Early life ==
Liz McAlister was born Maureen McAlister to Irish immigrant parents in Montclair, New Jersey. She and her twin sister Katherine had a sheltered upbringing and attended Lacordaire Academy. Following graduation, the sisters attended Marymount College, Tarrytown. During her sophomore year at Marymount College, McAlister, still Maureen, entered the novitiate of the Religious of the Sacred Heart of Mary (RSHM). In June 1961, she became Sister Elizabeth McAlister. McAlister continued her studies at Hunter College, graduating with a master's degree in art. She then returned to teach art history at Marymount College in 1963.

== Life of protest and witness ==
=== Philip Berrigan ===
While an instructor at Marymount College, McAlister got involved with peace demonstrations and prayer vigils against the Vietnam War. Through this community, McAlister met Philip Berrigan, who came to speak and demonstrate in Tarrytown, New York. According to McAlister's daughter, Frida Berrigan, the two met "at a funeral in 1966", although there are accounts that Berrigan and McAlister moved in the same circles from 1964, on. In early 1969, Phil Berrigan and McAlister married by "mutual consent". At this time, Berrigan was awaiting sentencing for pouring blood on draft files in the U.S. Customs House in Baltimore.

=== Harrisburg Seven ===
While Berrigan was in federal prison for his involvement in the Catonsville Nine, McAlister and Berrigan communicated via a fellow inmate, Boyd Douglas, who was allowed furlough for work release. Douglas was an informant for the Federal Bureau of Investigation, and turned over the contents of Berrigan and McAlister's letters to the authorities. These letters, which seemed to include plans to kidnap Henry Kissinger (the material was deliberately taken out of context), led to the prosecution of McAlister, Berrigan, and five others, known as the Harrisburg Seven.

=== Excommunication and marriage ===
Berrigan had spoken and written about the importance of celibacy to activists, but abandoned his previous position against romantic entanglements for McAlister. McAlister and Berrigan were married (witnessed commitment) in January 1972 while Berrigan was in prison. Following his parole, on May 28, 1973, they were legally married and they were excommunicated by the Catholic Church, though their excommunication was later lifted. McAlister had three children with Berrigan: Frida, Jerry, and Kate. McAlister and Berrigan continued their activism, serving jail time for their civil disobedience. During their twenty-nine year marriage, Berrigan and McAlister spent a total of eleven years separated by prison.

== Jonah House and later life ==
McAlister and Berrigan founded Jonah House in 1973. Called a resistance community Jonah House was a commune, with the Berrigan-McAlister family living in the basement of the Baltimore row house. They raised their three children there, with the help of the other activists in the community. In 1996, Jonah House moved to a house overlooking St. Peter's Cemetery, and the community members cared for the grounds.

DePaul University Special Collections and Archives holds collections of papers and ephemera, donated by Berrigan family members and friends. These collections include news clippings related to McAlister's life and protest actions, as well as personal letters written by McAlister. The Berrigan Library includes McAlister's personal books, some annotated in her hand.

=== Kings Bay plowshares action at Trident nuclear submarine base ===
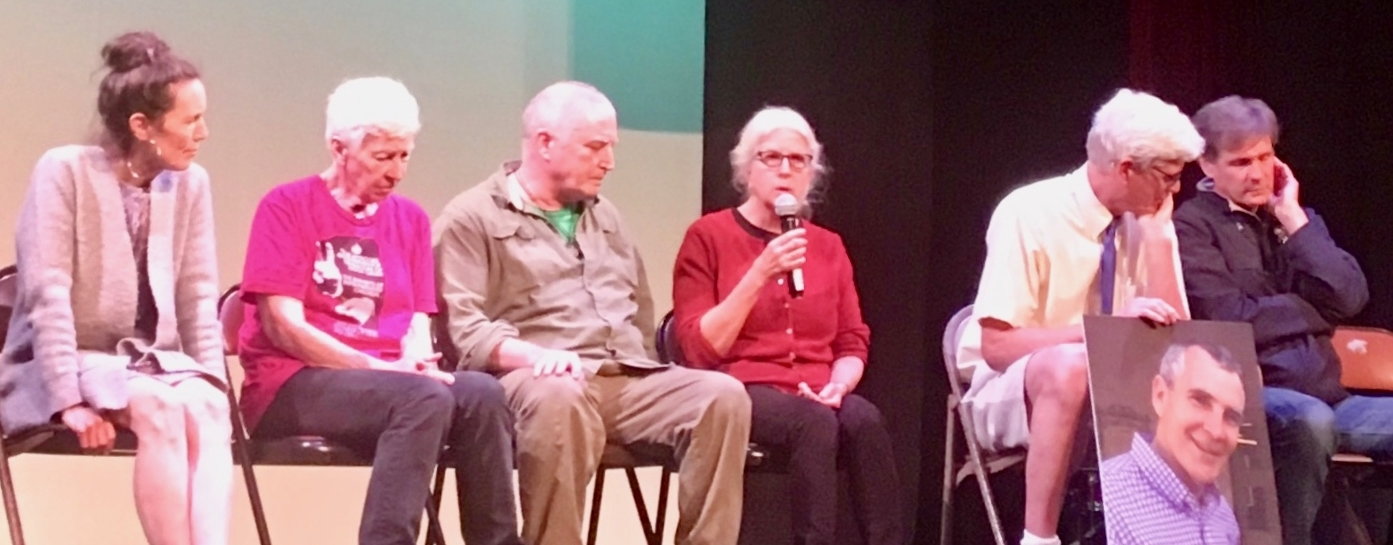
Six of the Kings Bay Plowshares 7 at Festival of Hope during their trial

On April 4, 2018, McAlister and six other people collectively known as the Kings Bay Plowshares 7, entered the Naval Submarine Base Kings Bay and performed symbolic acts of disarmament. October 24, 2019, McAlister was convicted on four counts in federal court in Brunswick, GA for entering and holding a symbolic disarming of the Trident submarine's nuclear weapons. Other defendants were Clare Grady, Martha Hennessey (Founder of the Catholic Worker, Dorothy Day's granddaughter), Carmen Trotta, Patrick O'Neill, Fr. Steve Kelly, SJ, and Mark Colville. McAlister was sentenced in June 2020 to time served, probation and restitution.

== See also ==
- Christian anarchism
- Christian pacifism
- List of peace activists
- Catholic Worker Movement
- Plowshares
