= ArchCity Defenders =

Legal advocacy organization in St. Louis, Missouri

- Established: 2009; 17 years ago
- Founders: Thomas Harvey, Michael-John Voss, and John McAnnar
- Type: Non-profit
- Purpose: Combat the criminalization of poverty and state violence, especially in communities of color
- Services: Civil and criminal legal representation, social services, impact litigation, policy and media advocacy, and community collaboration
- Executive Director: Blake Strode
- Award: Thomas Merton Award
- Website: archcitydefenders.org

ArchCity Defenders (ACD) is a legal advocacy organization in St. Louis, Missouri.

== History ==
ArchCity Defenders was co-founded by three graduates of St. Louis University School of Law in 2009, modeled after The Bronx Defenders, to address gaps in civic and criminal justice services. ACD primarily operated on volunteer service and donated office space. They expanded operations in 2013 through a contract from mayor Francis Slay's initiative to end chronic homelessness.

In 2017, Blake Strode was named the new executive director after two years on staff through the Skadden Fellowship.

In 2018, ACD was awarded the Thomas Merton Award.

== Activities ==
Between 2015 and 2018, ACD filed class action lawsuits against seven cities in St. Louis County for civil rights violations, reaching a settlement of over $20 million. Lawsuits describe the violations as a debtors' prison scheme in which plaintiffs were charged with minor infractions and held in prison when unable to pay cash bail without due process. In 2024, ACD produced a report on St. Louis municipal courts demonstrating the impact of reforms and presenting an argument for court consolidation.

Starting in 2017, ACD participated in the Close the Workhouse campaign due to poor conditions and treatment at the St. Louis Medium Security Institution. The institution was closed by Tishaura Jones and ACD came to a settlement of $4 million for people incarcerated between 2012-2022.

In 2026, ACD and Action St. Louis opened the Northside Movement Center as a joint headquarters and community serves hub following the 2025 St. Louis tornado.
