= The Saint Patrick's Day Four =

American Catholic anti-war protest

The Saint Patrick's Day Four (also, The Saint Patrick's Four, or SP4) are four American peace activists of Irish Catholic heritage who poured their own blood on the walls, posters, windows, and a US flag at a military recruiting center to protest the United States' impending 2003 invasion of Iraq. Peter De Mott, Daniel Burns, Teresa Grady, and Clare Grady each were members of the Ithaca Catholic Worker community, which teaches that Christians should practice non-violence and devote their lives to service of others. They each served between four and six months in federal prison for their action on Saint Patrick's Day, March 17, 2003, in Lansing, New York, near Ithaca where they reside.

== Two trials ==
Their first trial on state trespass charges, held in Ithaca, ended in a mistrial due to a hung jury.

On September 19, 2005, the four activists were retried on federal charges in Binghamton, generally considered to be a more conservative area where obtaining a conviction would be easier. However, local activists staged a massive protest outside the courthouse each day of the trial, and organized a six-day "Citizen's Tribunal on Iraq" (modeled after the World Tribunal on Iraq), featuring many internationally known speakers.

The four defended themselves pro se, but were assisted by a team of attorneys, such as William P. Quigley. Although they were cleared of the most serious charges, they were convicted of misdemeanor charges of damage to government property and entering a military station for an unlawful purpose.

== The four defendants ==
Daniel Burns was born in 1963 the tenth of twelve children of a former mayor of Binghamton, NY. He worked for twenty years in the film industry, and is a member of the Directors Guild of America. He has traveled to Iraq and to Guantanamo Bay, Cuba, as part of a delegation from Christian Peacemaker Teams. Some of his siblings perform as The Burns Sisters.

Teresa Grady was born in 1965. She is a founding member of the Ithaca Catholic Worker community after working with a similar community in San Jose, CA. Along with Burns and her sister Clare, she visited Guantanamo Bay, Cuba, in 2005 and attempted to gain access to the U.S. military base there to protest the treatment of the detainees, many held without charges.

Clare Grady was born in 1958, and has worked as a kitchen coordinator at Loaves and Fishes Community Kitchen for seventeen years. In addition to belonging to the Ithaca Catholic Worker community, she also belongs to the Atlantic Life Community, Phillip and his brother Daniel Berrigan being notable members. Clare and Teresa are daughters of John Peter Grady, a peace activist, who as one of the Camden 28, broke into a local draft board and destroyed records.

Peter De Mott was born in 1947 and died in 2009. He served in the Vietnam War as a United States Marine and later served in Turkey as a U. S. Army translator. During this time he developed strong anti-war beliefs, and joined the Catholic Worker Movement in 1979, with a focus on addressing the causes of poverty, unemployment and homelessness. In 2003, he traveled to Iraq as part of a Christian Peacemaker Team. He was married to Ellen Grady (sister of Clare and Teresa), and they had four daughters.

== Kings Bay plowshares action at Trident nuclear submarine base ==
On October 24, 2019, Clare Grady was convicted on four counts in federal court in Brunswick, Georgia for entering and symbolically nonviolently disarming the Trident submarine's nuclear weapons. On April 4, 2018, Grady with six other people entered the base and performed symbolic acts of disarmament. Other defendants were Elizabeth McAlister, Martha Hennessy (granddaughter of the founder of the Catholic Worker, Dorothy Day), Carmen Trotta, Patrick O’Neill, Fr. Steve Kelly, SJ, and Mark Colville. In November 2020 two of the seven activists were sentenced, with Clare Grady receiving a prison sentence of one year and one day and Carmen Trotta receiving a prison sentence of 14 months. The defendants were also ordered to pay a share of the $33,503.51 it cost to clean and repair the damage done.

== In popular culture ==
In 2006 documentary film about the activists titled The trial of the St. Patrick's four was made by Adolfo Doring
