= Pittsburgh Organizing Group =

Pittsburgh Organizing Group, often referred to as POG, was a Pittsburgh, Pennsylvania-based anarchist organization concerned with anti-militarism, social and economic justice, labor solidarity and police brutality issues locally, nationally, and internationally. POG was formed in 2002, and since then it has been responsible for the most persistent local protests against the Iraq War and claims to be one of the largest radical groups in Pittsburgh. The group has organized protests, pickets, vigils, direct actions, street theatre, concerts, teach-ins, conferences, and rallies. Some of its events have been overtly confrontational and disruptive. More than 122 people have been arrested at POG organized direct actions, and some events have involved direct confrontation with the police. POG is an affiliate group of the Northeast Anarchist Network.

The group opposes the way the American justice system works, and it chooses to settle what would normally be criminal cases without involving law enforcement. However, the group does accept the use of the court system against the state in some circumstances.

== Major protest actions ==
According to the group, its first project was organizing a trip to Washington, D.C. for the 2002 annual meeting of the IMF and World Bank. On September 1, POG held its first public event, a teach-in in preparation for the fall meetings of IMF and World Bank in Washington DC. In October, POG cosponsored a workshop to teach demonstrators nonviolent protest and civil disobedience tactics as well as methods for protecting themselves and others at protests. The group's first major action was a trip to Washington, D.C. for the 2002 annual meeting of the IMF and World Bank. The group participated in a planned "People's Strike", an attempt by the Washington, D.C. Anti-Capitalist Convergence to shut down the city. The arrest of over 400 protesters in Pershing Park resulted in a class action lawsuit.

In the lead-up to the war with Iraq, POG joined with the Thomas Merton Center of Pittsburgh to organize a “regional convergence against war” on January 24 to 26, 2003. The convergence included three days of protests, forums, teach-ins, and civil disobedience. 2,500 people marched in a POG protest on January 25, making the event the largest anti-war protest in Pittsburgh in at least 30 years.

In 2004, the group organized a black bloc in Pittsburgh to protest a visit by President George W. Bush.

In April 2005, POG began a campaign to counter military recruitment in Pittsburgh when they blocked off an Army Reserve recruiting table in Carnegie Mellon University's student union for 45 minutes during the lunchtime rush.

On August 20, 2005, between 30 and 50 POG demonstrators marched to protest a military recruitment center in Oakland and attempt to close it for the day. Six people were arrested, a taser was used on one woman, and another was bitten by a police dog. The events led to a controversy over the actions of demonstrators and the Pittsburgh police. This controversy led to hearings before Pittsburgh City Council, calls for a moratorium on the use of tasers at protests, criticism of police conduct by local politicians, and a police review board staffed by citizens. The next week, POG organized another march at the same recruiting station to protest both the military recruitment and the alleged mistreatment of protesters by police.

On January 13, 2007, POG announced that it planned to barricade the entrances to the National Robotics Engineering Center (NREC). On March 2, 2007, POG members blockaded the Center, a venture of Carnegie Mellon University (CMU) that receives tens of millions of dollars from the Pentagon and has become a world leader in development of robotics used in warfare. Protesters blocked access to the center by locking their arms together in PVC pipe, hanging suspended from poles rigged into a tripod, or locking themselves to the gate. The protest resulted in 14 arrests. The group claimed victory.

Another confrontation occurred between POG demonstrators and police in an April 3, 2007 POG protest outside a Marines recruiting center. Protesters and unaffiliated witnesses claimed that a police officer grabbed a demonstrator by the throat. The event was investigated by the city's Citizen Police Review Board. The Marine recruiting center was later vandalized that night, to include smashing of windows and anti-war slogans spray painted in large letters on the building, though POG denied any involvement.

The military recruitment center protests are part of a "counter-recruitment" strategy by the group aimed at lowering the numbers of people who enlist. By January 2007, the group had organized 45 protests at military recruiting stations.

On August 8, 2007, POG announced plans to hold a camp-out and fast for 26 days outside the main military recruiting station in Oakland in protest of the war in Iraq. POG asked the city for a permit, and received one but only for a 24 hours. The event kicked off as scheduled on September 4, 2007, and on September 4, POG announced that they would continue without a permit.

In September 2007, the ACLU filed a First Amendment lawsuit against the city of Pittsburgh on behalf of POG, arguing that members' rights to protest outside an Army recruiting office had been violated when they were cited for blocking a sidewalk during the protests. The city and the group came to an agreement that protesters would occupy only certain parts of the sidewalk for the rest of September. The city agreed to allow protesters to lie down on the section of the Forbes Avenue sidewalk they had occupied, and to set up chairs and sleeping bags as long as the sidewalk was not obstructed. The agreement also dropped the restraining order that the POG had filed against the Pittsburgh City Police on September 18, 2007.

In the spring of 2008, POG officially became an anarchist group and brought several anarchist speakers to Pittsburgh including Cindy Milstein, George Sossenko, Ashanti Alston and Wayne Price.

On July 19, 2011 POG officially disbanded citing that "[they] have not been a means through which to effectively respond to the priorities individual members have often articulated is indicative of the fact we lack the common ground required to collectively organize."
