= Berrigan Brothers =

The Berrigan Brothers are:

- Daniel Berrigan (1921-2016), American peace activist.
- Philip Berrigan (1923-2002), American peace activist.
