= Stephen Kelly (priest) =

American priest and peace activist

Stephen Michael Kelly SJ (born c.1949) is an American Jesuit priest and peace activist. He spent six years in prison for hammering on D-5 Trident missiles and other Plowshares movement actions. He has spent at least a decade behind bars, with six of those years in solitary confinement.

Kelly was ordained a Jesuit priest in 1990. He is a member of the Jesuits West U.S. province.

He gave the homily at the funeral Mass of Daniel Berrigan.

== Kings Bay Plowshares ==
On April 4, 2018, he took part in the Kings Bay Plowshares action.

For his part in the action, he was sentenced to 33 months in jail, three years probation, and a share of the $33,503.51 in restitution. The judge gave him credit for the 30 months he spent in jail awaiting trial and sentencing.
