= Kate Hennessy =

American writer

Kate Hennessy (born 1960) is an American writer.

== Life and work ==
Hennessy grew up Weathersfield, Vermont. She is the ninth and youngest child of David Hennessy and Tamar Day Hennessy, the only child of Dorothy Day. Her sister is Martha Hennessy.

Hennessy was raised, in her words, "outside the church, but inside the Catholic Worker."

Her work has been included in Best American Travel Writing.

Kate attended New York University and the School for International Training in Vermont.

Her book, Dorothy Day: The World Will Be Saved By Beauty: An Intimate Portrait of My Grandmother was the best spiritual writing of 2017 according to the Chicago Tribune. It won a Christopher Award.

Kate lives in Ireland with her husband Garry Jones.

== Books ==
- Dorothy Day: The World Will Be Saved By Beauty Scribner, 2016
- Dorothy Day and the Catholic Worker: The Miracle of our Continuance Fordham University Press, 2016 collaboration with the photographer Vivian Cherry
