= Father Berrigan =

Father Berrigan may refer to:

- Daniel Berrigan, American Catholic priest and peace activist, brother of Philip
- Philip Berrigan, American Catholic priest and peace activist, brother of Daniel
