= Carl Kabat =

American anti-nuclear activist (1933–2022)

The Reverend Carl Kabat Obl.OMI
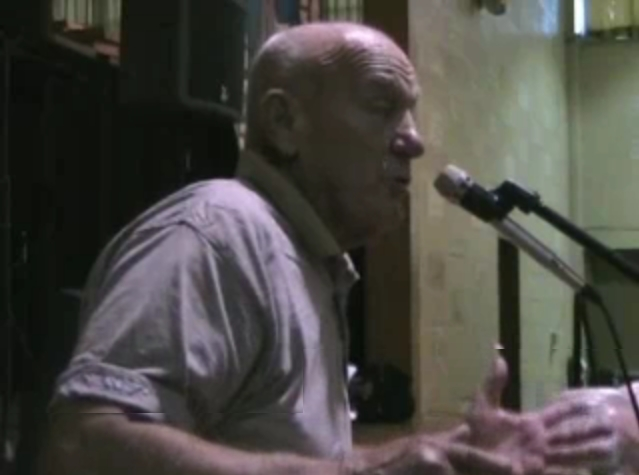
- Kabat in 2008 at the Catholic Worker National Gathering
- Born: October 10, 1933; Scheller, Illinois, U.S.
- Died: August 4, 2022 (aged 88); San Antonio, Texas, U.S.
- Occupations: Priest; missionary; activist
- Organization: Missionary Oblates of Mary Immaculate
- Movement: Plowshares movement; Anti-nuclear movement

Carl K. Kabat OMI (October 10, 1933 – August 4, 2022) was an American priest of the Catholic religious order Missionary Oblates of Mary Immaculate, best known for his eccentric, nonviolent protests against nuclear weapons. He served more than 17 years total in prison over his lifetime.

== Early life ==
Kabat was born on October 10, 1933, on a farm in Scheller, Jefferson County, Illinois, United States, the third of five children. He dropped out of the University of Illinois where he was a pre-med student. He was ordained to the priesthood in 1959 one year after his elder brother Paul, a member of the same order. He served as a missionary first in the Philippines and then in Brazil.

== Activism ==
On September 9, 1980, Kabat and seven others (known as the Plowshares Eight) entered the General Electric Re-entry Systems Building in King of Prussia, Pennsylvania, where Mark 12A reentry vehicles were made. They damaged two vehicles, poured blood on documents, and prayed for peace. They were arrested and initially charged with burglary and other charges. The story is partly told in the book ARISE AND WITNESS: Poems by Anne Montgomery, RSCJ, About Faith, Prison, War Zones and Nonviolent Resistance, published in 2024.

In February 1981, they underwent a jury trial in Norristown, Pennsylvania. During their trial they were denied a justification defense and did not present expert testimony. Due to the Court's suppression of individual testimony about the Mark 12A and U.S. nuclear war-fighting policies, four left the trial and returned to witness at General Electric. They were re-arrested and returned to court. They were convicted by a jury of burglary, conspiracy, and criminal mischief and sentenced to prison terms of five to ten years. They appealed and the Pennsylvania Superior Court reversed their convictions in February 1984. In November 1984, Kabat was one of four protesters who cut through a chained fence and broke into a Minuteman II silo 30 miles east of Kansas City, Missouri. They were arrested while sitting in a circle, singing, and holding hands. For that protest, Kabat received an 18-year prison sentence and served 10 years.

Following a ruling in the fall of 1985 by the Pennsylvania Supreme Court in favor of the Commonwealth of Pennsylvania on certain issues (including the exclusion of the justification defense), the Plowshares Eight case was returned to the Superior Court Appeals Panel. In December 1987, the Superior Court of Pennsylvania refused their appeal, but ordered a re-sentencing. This ruling, however, was appealed to the Pennsylvania Supreme Court. In February 1989 the Pennsylvania Supreme Court denied a hearing of any further issues in the case, and on October 2, 1989, the U.S. Supreme Court announced it would not hear the Plowshares Eight appeal. On April 10, 1990, the Plowshares Eight were resentenced by the Pennsylvania Court of Common Pleas in Norristown and, with neither the prosecutor nor General Electric making any recommendations or asking reparations, paroled for up to 23½ months in consideration of time already served in prison. Judge James Buckingham considered statements by the defendants, attorney Ramsey Clark, Dr. Robert Jay Lifton, and Professors Richard Falk and Howard Zinn, placing the crime in the context of the common plight of humanity, international law, America's long tradition of dissent, and the primacy of individual conscience over entrenched political system.

In 2009, Kabat protested at a Minuteman missile site outside of Greeley, Colorado.

On July 4, 2011, and again on July 4, 2012, Kabat entered the Kansas City Plant, a nuclear bomb component manufacturing facility then under construction in Kansas City, Missouri. He referred to the trespass as the 85% Pruning Hooks action, in reference to the fact that the plant produced approximately 85% of the non-nuclear components for US nuclear weapons.

On December 13, 2013, Kabat and five other protestors were found guilty of again trespassing at the Kansas City Plant, but were given the unusual sentence of writing essay responses to questions posed by the judge.

== Death ==
Kabat died at the age of 88 on August 4, 2022, at the Madonna Oblate Residence in San Antonio, Texas.

== See also ==
- Plowshares Movement
- Dorothy Day
