= Martha Hennessy =

American peace activist

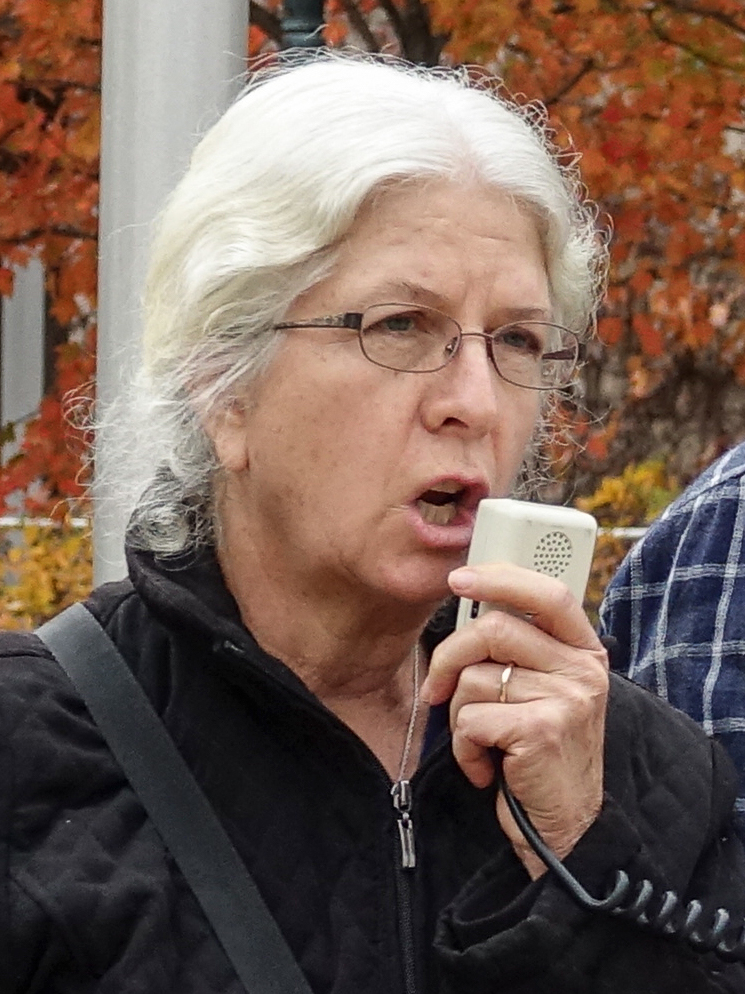
Hennessy in 2016

Martha Hennessy (born July 11, 1955) is an American Catholic peace activist and member of the Catholic Worker Movement co-founded by her grandmother, Dorothy Day.

== Life and work ==
Hennessy grew up Weathersfield, Vermont. She is the seventh child of David Hennessy and Tamar Day Hennessy, the only child of Dorothy Day. Her sister is the author Kate Hennessy.

She worked for 30 years as an occupational therapist, including time at the US Department of Veterans Affairs (VA) Medical Center, White River Junction Healthcare System in White River Junction.

Hennessy is active in the Catholic Worker Movement. In 1979, Hennessy was arrested with many other demonstrators while attempting to occupy the Seabrook Station Nuclear Power Plant under construction in Seabrook, New Hampshire.

Since then, she has been arrested while demonstrating against the prison at Guantanamo Bay, the United States government's use of drones in war, and the use of starvation as a weapon of war in Yemen.

In 2020 Hennessy was interviewed about her life, anti-war activism, and grandmother, Dorothy Day, who co-founded the Catholic Worker Movement with Peter Maurin in 1933.

=== Kings Bay Plowshares ===
On April 4, 2018, Hennessy took part in the Kings Bay Plowshares action, breaking into Kings Bay Naval Submarine Base in Georgia to protest its stockpile of nuclear weapons. She was arrested and later placed under house arrest in late May 2018 with an electronic monitoring bracelet strapped to her left ankle. On November 13, 2020, she was sentenced to 10 months in prison. As an extension of the Plowshares witness she blurbed a book about Plowshares, ARISE AND WITNESS: Poems by Anne Montgomery, RSCJ, About Faith, Prison, War Zones and Nonviolent Resistance, published in 2024.

== Personal life ==
Hennessy is married to Steven Melanson, a carpenter and photographer. They have been married for 40 years. She is a grandmother of eight. She lives on her family farm in Vermont and at Maryhouse Catholic Worker in New York City.
