= Susan Hagedorn =

American documentary filmmaker and nurse practitioner

Susan Hagedorn is an American documentary filmmaker and nurse practitioner. In 1969, she was identified in contemporaneous reporting as being involved with the Weatherman faction of Students for a Democratic Society, later known as the Weather Underground. She is the daughter of Horace Hagedorn, co-founder of the Miracle-Gro brand and a longtime executive of ScottsMiracle-Gro.

== Early life and family ==
Hagedorn is the eldest daughter of Horace Hagedorn, who co-founded Miracle-Gro in the 1950s. Following the merger of Miracle-Gro and Scotts in 1995, the Hagedorn family maintained a substantial ownership stake in the combined company, ScottsMiracle-Gro. Public philanthropic records identify her as a participant in family charitable initiatives associated with the Horace and Amy Hagedorn Fund and related foundations.

== Activism ==
In November 1969, The Boston Globe reported that Susan Hagedorn was among those arrested in Cambridge, Massachusetts, in connection with Weatherman activities and was charged in connection with the investigation following a police shooting at Cambridge Police Headquarters. She was also identified in contemporaneous reporting by The Harvard Crimson as among those arrested in related raids. In later public statements, including quotations published in a 2026 New York Times guest essay written by her daughter, Hagedorn reflected on her involvement in antiwar activism during that period.

== Nursing career ==
She earned a Bachelor of Science in Nursing from the University of Massachusetts Amherst in 1977. She later received a master’s degree in maternal–child nursing from Boston College and a doctorate in nursing from the University of Colorado.

Hagedorn worked as a nurse practitioner and educator. Her practice and teaching included psychiatric, pediatric, public health, women’s health, and adolescent health nursing. In 1987, The Boston Globe identified Hagedorn as a nurse practitioner and school health educator participating in a public forum on AIDS education and school condom distribution policy. In 2006, she was identified as an associate professor at the University of Colorado Denver & Health Sciences Center and was listed among recipients of a Florence Nightingale award. She has been named a Fellow of the American Academy of Nursing and the American Association of Nurse Practitioners.

== Writings ==
- Hagedorn, Susan PhD, RN, CPNP, OGNP. The politics of caring: The role of activism in primary care. Advances in Nursing Science 17(4):p 1-11, June 1995.
- Hagedorn, Susan. "Student views of the school nurse's role in a secondary school condom availability program." Journal of School Health, vol. 63, no. 8, Oct. 1993, pp. 358+. Gale Academic OneFile, link.gale.com/apps/doc/A14795755/AONE
- Hagedorn, S., & Ekegren, K. (2002). Caring for Street Youth: A Nursing Challenge. Journal for Specialists in Pediatric Nursing, 7(1), 34. https://doi-org.10.1111/j.1744-6155.2002.tb00146.x

== Filmmaking ==
Hagedorn later worked as a documentary filmmaker. Her films have addressed subjects including immigration enforcement, health care, and political activism. Works attributed to her include Seeking Shelter, Inventing the Nurse Practitioner in America, Island Nurse, Deputized: ¿Cómo Pudo Pasar?, and The Berrigans: Devout and Dangerous, a documentary about Catholic antiwar activists Daniel and Philip Berrigan.
