= Larry Kessler =

American activist (1942–2024)

Larry Kessler (June 20, 1942 – February 1, 2024) was the Founding Director of the AIDS Action Committee of Massachusetts, an agency that has served over half of all people diagnosed with AIDS in Massachusetts, educated generations about the disease, and secured progressive city, state, and federal AIDS policy.

== Early life ==
Kessler was born in 1942 in Pittsburgh, Pennsylvania. He worked as an ironworker, a small businessman, a seminarian, and a community organizer. In 1960, after high school, he briefly studied for the priesthood before becoming a full-time social activist.

== Activism ==
Kessler founded and directed Project Appalachia, an anti-poverty program, from 1966-1968. The Meals on Wheels program he started in McKees Rock, Pennsylvania, still operates today. As co-founder and director of Pittsburgh's Thomas Merton Center from 1970-1973, he took an active role in the civil rights, anti-poverty, and anti-war movements.

Kessler continued his activism at Boston's Paulist Center from 1973-1979, where he expanded the Walk for Hunger into the year-round anti-hunger program, Project Bread. During Boston's desegregation crisis in 1974, Kessler served as a bus monitor to help Boston kids get to school safely.

Kessler retired in 2006, but returned to activism in 2013, when Victory Programs asked him to run the Boston Living Center, which serves HIV-positive individuals. Kessler retired for a second time in 2015.

=== AIDS activism ===
While running a successful business in 1982, Kessler first heard about the onset of the HIV/AIDS epidemic. He and others met at Fenway Community Health Clinic to discuss the crisis, and the AIDS Action Committee of Massachusetts (AAC) was created. Kessler became its first employee in 1983, and served as AAC's Executive Director from 1983 until early 2002, when he moved into the Founding Director's role at the agency.

In 1985, Kessler was a founding board member of the National AIDS Network, and later a founding board member of AIDS Action Council in Washington. In 1989, he was appointed to the National Commission on AIDS by the U.S. Senate.

== The Larry Kessler 5K Run ==
AAC relies on funding each year from its annual AIDS Walk Boston and Larry Kessler 5K Run where participants engage in peer-to-peer fundraising in support of the agency. The Larry Kessler 5K Run originated as a 5K race held concurrently with AIDS Walk Boston in 2001 and was renamed in honor of AAC's founding director in 2006.
