= Jonah House =

Commune in Baltimore, Maryland, US

Coordinates: 39°18′12.8″N 76°39′19.8″W

Jonah House is a faith-based community/commune in Baltimore, Maryland, United States, centered on the concept of "Nonviolence, resistance and community". It was founded in 1973 by a group that included Philip Berrigan (one of the Catonsville Nine), then a Catholic priest, and Elizabeth McAlister, formerly a Catholic nun. Jonah House is located on the grounds of St. Peter's Cemetery in West Baltimore south of Coppin Heights. The 22-acre (89,000 m^{2}) cemetery was largely abandoned and overgrown, the community has devoted itself to restoring and maintaining it.

Jonah House has been specifically regarded as a prime example of a Catholic Worker House of Resistance.

The community's papers are held at the TriCollege Libraries.

== Nonviolence ==
Much of the non-violent resistance direct actions undertaken by Jonah House have taken the form of Plowshares actions. Additionally non-violence is practiced in the community both as a way of thought and action. Education of the injustice present in violence is contemplated.

== Food pantry ==
Jonah House donates food and clothes to persons in need.

== Sister communities ==
Jonah House is part of a network of individuals and communities along the east coast that calls itself "The Atlantic Life Community".

The Pacific Life Community is a similar organization encompassing the west coast of the United States of America, Pacific Islands and East Asia.

Jonah House is also a sister community with Dorothy Day Catholic Worker House (in D.C.) Viva House Catholic Worker, and The P. Francis Murphy Justice/Peace Initiative.
