= The Camden 28 (film) =

- Directed by: Anthony Giacchino
- Produced by: Anthony Giacchino
- Edited by: Brandon Park
- Music by: Michael Giacchino
- Distributed by: First Run Features
- Release date: 2007
- Running time: 83 minutes
- Country: United States
- Language: English

The Camden 28 is a 2007 documentary film written, directed, and produced by Anthony Giacchino. The film, airing as a part of PBS's Point of View series, follows the story of the Camden 28. It was a group of twenty-eight members of the "Catholic Left" who were arrested in 1971 for attempting to break into and vandalize a draft board in Camden, New Jersey. Because the Camden 28 were not militant and did not plant bombs like the Weathermen, the documentary examines how they posed a much greater threat to the U.S. government as the growing religious opposition to the Vietnam War could not be written off as extremists.

The film was met with high critical praise and a WGA Award nomination for Best Documentary Screenplay. On the review aggregator website Rotten Tomatoes, 92% of 26 critics' reviews are positive, with an average rating of 7.3/10. The website's consensus reads: "Despite the fact the events chronicled in The Camden 28 occurred 30 years ago, this poignant and compassionate doc about Vietnam protesters is both powerful and timely."
