= Susan Crane (peace activist) =

Susan Crane (born c.1943) is a peace activist, a member of the California Catholic Worker movement and a participant in the Plowshares movement. After decades of civil disobedience related to campaigns against nuclear war, she was sentenced to jail time in Germany in 2024.

== California Catholic Worker House ==
Crane is a longtime member of California Catholic Worker House, an organization that provides support for people who are struggling with poverty and homelessness. This organization continues the work of Dorothy Day and the Catholic Worker Movement.

Susan Crane
- Occupation: Political activist
- Years active: 1990s-Present
- Organization(s): Catholic Worker Movement, Plowshares
- Known for: Pacifism

== Plowshares movement ==
Crane has been involved in four notable direct action protests through the Plowshares Movement where she worked alongside notable peace activists such as Sr. Anne Montgomery. In the mid-1990s, Crane belonged to an anti-war organization known as Jubilee Plowshares.

In 1998, Crane poured her own blood on a nuclear destroyer. In 2011, she was part of a group known as Disarm Now Plowshares. Crane has been critical of U.S. involvement in NATO and refers to the organization as a "war making force" believing it is beyond "anybody's control."

== Büchel Air Force Base ==
Beginning in 2018, Crane and 17 other peace activists broke into Büchel Air Force Base in Germany where U.S. nuclear weapons were being stored. These weapons are known as B61s. This direct action was known as part of the "Büchel is everywhere" campaign.

== Volkel Air Base ==
In 2023, Crane was arrested at Volkel Air Base in The Netherlands. She was interviewed about this direct action protest by Amy Goodman of Democracy Now in August that year and was quoted as saying, "We're very concerned about the legality of the United States sending nuclear warheads to the five countries in Europe, particularly to the Netherlands and to Germany, because it's against the Non-Proliferation Treaty. The treaty says that nuclear countries can't share, as it were, their nuclear weapons with nonnuclear countries, and nonnuclear countries can't accept these weapons. So, as far as we're concerned, the Volkel Air Base...is a crime scene..." Crane was sentenced to serve 7 months in prison for this protest.

== Arrests & trials ==
- August 1993: Arrested at Lawrence Livermore Lab in San Jose, California
- October 1993: Arrested at Lawrence Livermore Lab. After her arrest that year she went on a hunger fast.
- December 1993: Crane dressed in a Santa Claus costume and was arrested at the Concord Naval Weapons Station for obstructing a roadway
- 1995: Arrested at Lockheed Martin in San Jose for hammering on a Trident missile
- 1997: Arrested in Bath, Maine for destruction of government property to a nuclear missile destroyer
- 2000: Sentenced to prison in Baltimore for damage to warplanes owned by the Maryland National Guard.
- 2009: Arrested at Kitsap-Bangor Naval Base, Washington
- 2011: Put on trial at Naval Base Kitsap-Bangor and Strategic Weapons Facility-Pacific (SWFPAC), Tacoma, Washington
- 2023: Arrested at Volkel Air Base, The Netherlands

== Personal life ==
Crane has two children. She also lived in Ukiah, California where she was a tax resister. In 1988, she was part of a group that erected a peace pole in front of the Fort Bragg Library.

== Publications ==
- Disciples & Dissidents: The Prison Writings of the Prince of Peace Plowshares (2001)
