= Clare Grady =

American peace activist

Clare Grady is an American peace activist and a member of the Catholic Worker and the Plowshares movements. She advocated against use of cruise missiles for first-strike capability in the 1983 Griffiss Plowshares action. In the process of the protest, military equipment was damaged and splattered with blood. In 2003, she and three others made up The Saint Patrick's Day Four, who conducted a protest action at a military recruiting center in Lansing, New York against the impending Iraq War. She participated in the Kings Bay Plowshares action on April 4, 2018, which resulted in a conviction and sentence of one year and a day.

== Early life and education ==
One of five children, Grady grew up in the Bronx, New York City. Her mother Teresa was from Chicago. Her father, activist John Peter Grady, was the child of Irish immigrants. He was one of the leaders of the Camden 28.

Her family moved to Ithaca, New York, on Cayuga land, in Haudenosaunee territory, when she was entering 10th grade. Grady found the area beautiful, but felt a homesickness for the Bronx. She attended high school in Ithaca for three years and then returned to New York City and joined the United Farm Workers. While taking classes at Hunter College, she waitressed and lived on the Lower East Side.

== Griffiss Plowshares action ==
In November 1983, Grady took part in her first Plowshares action. She and six others broke into a hangar at Griffiss Air Force Base and poured bottles of their own blood onto military equipment, and hammered on a B-52's bomb bay doors, four unmounted engines, and other aircraft parts. They also spray-painted slogans denouncing missiles, posted a document that "indicted" the United States military for violating international peace accords, and draped the B-52 with banners advocating peace and photographs of women and children.

The seven believed that the B-52 bomber was one of 172 that were being retrofitted at Griffiss to have the ability to deploy cruise missiles. Antinuclear activists were opposed to the missiles as they would be used to deliver nuclear weapons in a first-strike situation.

== The Saint Patrick's Day Four ==
On Saint Patrick's Day, March 17, 2003, Grady and three others, Daniel J. Burns, her sister, Teresa B. Grady, and Peter De Mott, took part in a protest action against the impending American invasion of Iraq. They poured their own blood on the walls, posters, windows, and on a US flag at a military recruiting center in Lansing, New York.

The Four were charged with felony criminal mischief in Tompkins County. George M. Dentes, the District Attorney, offered a plea bargain in which the group would plead guilty to a reduced charge and receive no jail time. All four refused the offer. The jury was deadlocked in state court, with nine members voting for an acquittal. Dentes referred the case to federal court, as he expected a similar outcome if the case was retried in state court. The four represented themselves in their federal trial. On September 26, 2005, they were found not guilty of conspiracy to impede an officer of the United States and guilty of the misdemeanor charges of damage to property and trespassing.

The story of the action is told in the 2006 documentary film The Trial of the St. Patrick's Four.

== Drone protest ==
On July 24, 2014, Grady was arrested while demonstrating outside the gates of Hancock Field Air National Guard Base. The protests were conducted with members of the Upstate Drone Action and Atlantic Life Community activists. She was protesting the drone attacks over Afghanistan that resulted in the deaths of children, claiming that the drone attacks resulted in war crimes. The weaponized MQ-9 Reaper drones were remotely controlled from within the base by the 174th Attack Wing of the New York State Air National Guard.

== Kings Bay Plowshares ==
On April 4, 2018, she took part in the Kings Bay Plowshares action against the use of nuclear weapons. The group was convicted on October 24, 2019. On November 12, 2020, Grady was sentenced to a year and a day in prison. On February 7, 2021, a "Festival of Hope" webinar in honor of Grady and the Kings Bay Plowshares 7 was hosted by the group Code Pink, three days before the start of Grady's prison term. Grady is serving her sentence at FPC Alderson in West Virginia.

== Personal life ==
Grady is married to Paul Sayvets. They have two daughters, Leah and Rosie.

She has worked at Loaves & Fishes, an Ithaca-based kitchen, for nearly two decades.
