= Harrisburg Seven =

American anti-Vietnam War activists

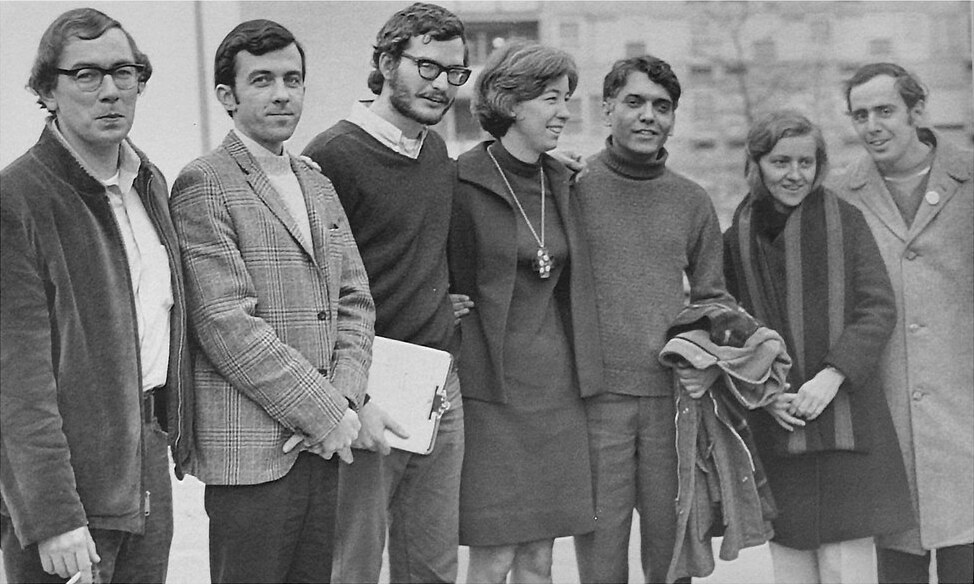
Seven of the eight defendants in January 1972: Wenderoth, McLaughlin, Glick, McAlister, Ahmad, and the Scoblicks

The Harrisburg Seven were a group of religious anti-war activists, led by Philip Berrigan, charged in 1971 in a failed conspiracy case in the United States District Court for the Middle District of Pennsylvania, located in Harrisburg. The seven were Phillip Berrigan, Elizabeth McAlister, Rev. Neil McLaughlin, Rev. Joseph Wenderoth, Eqbal Ahmad, Anthony Scoblick, and Mary Cain Scoblick.

The group was unsuccessfully prosecuted for alleged criminal plots during the Vietnam War era. Six of the seven were Roman Catholic nuns or priests. The seventh, Eqbal Ahmad, was a Pakistani journalist, American-trained political scientist, and self-described odd man out of the group. Haverford College physics professor William C. Davidon, the mastermind of the Media FBI burglary, was named as an unindicted co-conspirator in the case. In 1970, the group attracted government attention when Berrigan, then imprisoned, and McAlister were caught trading letters that alluded to kidnapping National Security Advisor Henry Kissinger and blowing up steam tunnels.

== Background ==
The defendants stood accused of conspiring to raid federal offices, to bomb government property, and to kidnap Kissinger.

Father Berrigan was serving time in the Lewisburg Federal Penitentiary, in central Pennsylvania. Boyd Douglas, who eventually would become an FBI informant and star prosecution witness, was a fellow inmate. Douglas was on a work-release at the library at nearby Bucknell University. Douglas used his connection with Berrigan to convince some students at Bucknell that he was an anti-war activist, telling some that he was serving time for anti-war activities. In fact, he was in prison for check forgery. In the course of the investigation the government resorted to unauthorized and illegal wiretapping.

Douglas set up a mail drop and persuaded students to transcribe letters intended for Berrigan into his school notebooks to smuggle into the prison. They were later called, unwillingly, as government witnesses. Douglas was the chief prosecution witness. Librarian Zoia Horn was jailed for nearly three weeks for refusing to testify for the prosecution on the grounds that her forced testimony would threaten intellectual and academic freedom. She was the first United States librarian to be jailed for refusing to share information as a matter of conscience.

== The trial ==
U.S. attorneys obtained an indictment charging the Harrisburg Seven with conspiracy to kidnap Kissinger and to bomb steam tunnels. They filed the case in Harrisburg, Pennsylvania, seat of the Middle District. Activist attorney and former Attorney General Ramsey Clark led the defense team for their trial during the spring months of 1972. Unconventionally, he did not call any witnesses in his clients' defense, including the defendants themselves. He reasoned that the jury was sympathetic to his Catholic clients and that that sympathy would be ruined by their testimony that they'd burned their draft cards. After nearly 60 hours of deliberations, the jury remained hung and the defendants were freed.

Douglas testified that he transmitted transcribed letters between the defendants, which the prosecution used as evidence of a conspiracy among them. Several of Douglas' former girlfriends testified at the trial that he acted not just as an informer, but also as a catalyst and agent provocateur for the group's plans.

There were minor convictions for a few of the defendants, based on smuggling mail into the prison; most of those were overturned on appeal.

The trial gained some notoriety for the use of scientific jury selection – use of demographic factors to identify unfavorable jurors – to keep the defendants from being convicted.

== See also ==
- COINTELPRO
- Richard Drinnon
