= Plowshares movement =

Christian pacifist movement

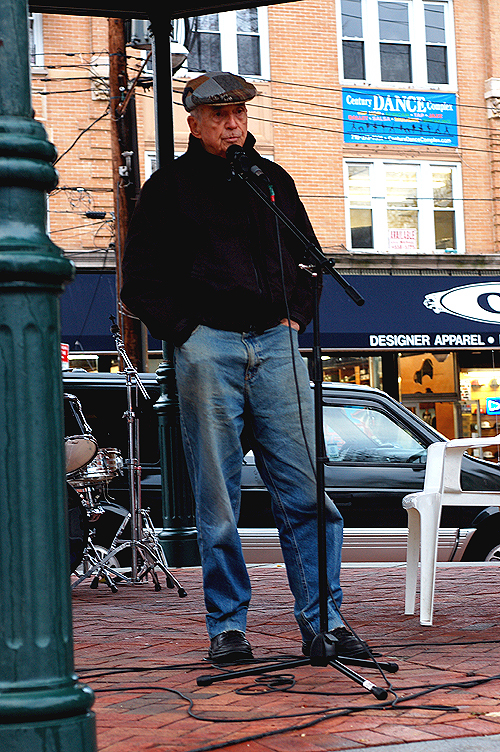
On September 9, 1980, Daniel Berrigan (above), his brother Philip, and six others (the "Plowshares Eight") initiated the Plowshares Movement.

The Plowshares movement is an anti-nuclear weapons and Christian pacifist movement that advocates active resistance to war. The group often practices a form of protest that involves the damaging of weapons and military property. The movement gained public attention in the early 1980s when several members damaged nuclear warhead nose cones and were subsequently convicted. The name refers to the biblical text of prophet Isaiah who said that swords shall be beaten into plowshares.

== History ==
The U.S. Plowshares group was deeply influenced by Catholicism and, in particular, the Catholic left movement of the late 1960s and the Catholic Worker Movement. The Plowshares movement takes its name from the idea of beating swords into ploughshares in the Book of Isaiah:

And many people shall go and say, Come ye, and let us go up to the mountain of the L, to the house of the God of Jacob; and he will teach us of his ways, and we will walk in his paths: for out of Zion shall go forth the law, and the word of the L from Jerusalem. And he shall judge among the nations, and shall rebuke many people: and they shall beat their swords into plowshares, and their spears into pruning hooks: nation shall not lift up sword against nation, neither shall they learn war any more.

— KJV

On September 9, 1980, Daniel Berrigan, his brother Philip Berrigan, Molly Rush, Carl Kabat and four others (the "Plowshares Eight") began the Plowshares Movement under the premise of beating swords to ploughshares. They trespassed onto the General Electric Re-entry Division in King of Prussia, Pennsylvania, where Mark 12A reentry vehicles for the Minuteman III missile were made. They hammered on two reentry vehicles, poured blood on documents, and offered prayers for peace. They were arrested and charged with more than ten felony and misdemeanor counts. Following a 1981 trial, all were convicted on all counts, receiving sentences of up to ten years' imprisonment. On April 10, 1990, after nearly a decade of appeals, the eight defendants were re-sentenced and placed on probation for up to 23 and 1/2 months in consideration of the various amounts of time that each had already served in prison. The circumstances of their trial were re-created in Emile de Antonio's 1982 docudrama In the King of Prussia, which starred Martin Sheen as the trial judge. The Plowshares Eight appear in the film as themselves. A book of poetry by Anne Montgomery RSCJ, a Catholic sister who was one of the eight, was published in 2024; all of the living members of the group contributed to it.

Church Committee Report Book III

== Actions ==
Other actions followed. In 1983, the "AVCO Plowshares" entered AVCO Systems Division, a manufacturing plant for MX and Pershing II missiles in Wilmington, Massachusetts, and damaged plans and equipment. They were arrested. The subsequent trial, including testimony from historian Howard Zinn, is documented in the film The Trial of the AVCO Plowshares by Global Village Video. As of 2000, some 71 such actions happened on several continents. There have been several more such actions since 2000. The longest sentences given to individuals were those meted out to the 1984 group, the Silo Pruning Hooks, two of which were sentenced to 18 years in federal prison for entering a Minuteman II missile silo.

=== Pouring of blood ===
Pouring of blood is a controversial symbolic act that has been traditionally conducted by Plowshares activists including Susan Crane.

== Post-2000 actions ==
On April 30, 2008, three Plowshares activists entered the GCSB Waihopai base near Blenheim, New Zealand and punctured an inflated radome used in the ECHELON signal interception program, causing $1.2 million in damages. In March 2010 the three men stood trial by jury at the District Court in Wellington and were acquitted. The New Zealand Attorney-General then lodged a civil claim, on behalf of the GCSB, for $1.2 million. This claim was dropped in February 2014.

On November 2, 2009, a Plowshares action took place in the U.S. at Naval Base Kitsap-Bangor, where Trident nuclear weapons are stored or deployed on Trident submarines. These weapons constitute the largest stockpile of nuclear weapons in the US.

On July 28, 2012, three Plowshares activists, Megan Rice, Greg Boertje-Obed, and Michael Walli, who compose the Transform Now Plowshares movement, breached security at the U.S. Department of Energy's Y-12 National Security Complex in Oak Ridge, Tennessee, causing the government to temporarily shut down the weapons facility. Once inside a "secure" area, the activists hung protest banners on a uranium storage site, poured human blood and spray-painted the walls with anti-war slogans. Following a controversial trial, the three activists were convicted in early May 2013 on the charges of damaging property in violation of 18 US Code 1363, damaging federal property in excess of $1000 in violation of 18 US Code 1361, and intending to injure, interfere with, or obstruct the national defense of the United States and willful damage of national security premises in violation of 18 US Code 2155. Megan Rice was sentenced to 35 months, or just under three years. The other two protesters, Greg Boertje-Obed and Michael Walli, both were sentenced to 62 months, or a little more than five years.

The National Nuclear Security Administration has acknowledged the seriousness of the 2012 Plowshares action, which involved the protesters walking into a high-security zone of the plant, calling the security breach "unprecedented." Independent security contractor, WSI, has since had a weeklong "security stand-down," a halt to weapons production, and mandatory refresher training for all security staff.

Non-proliferation policy experts are concerned about the relative ease with which these unarmed, unsophisticated protesters could cut through a fence and walk into the center of the facility. This is further evidence that nuclear security—the securing of highly enriched uranium and plutonium—should be a top priority to prevent terrorist groups from acquiring nuclear bomb-making material. These experts have questioned "the use of private contractors to provide security at facilities that manufacture and store the government's most dangerous military material".

On April 4, 2018, seven Plowshares activists calling themselves "Kings Bay Plowshares" were arrested at the Kings Bay Naval Submarine Base. Longtime peace activist Susan Crane was among those arrested. They stated that the action had been planned to coincide with the 50th anniversary of the Assassination of Martin Luther King Jr. The activists were arrested, handed over to local authorities, and taken to the county jail. The Kings Bay spokesman, Scott Bennett, said that no one had been threatened and no military personnel or assets were endangered. The base houses 8 Ohio-class submarines, 6 of which carry ballistic missiles and are described by the Navy as "designed specifically for stealth and the precise delivery of nuclear warheads." The seven Plowshares were found guilty on October 24, 2019. Liz McAlister was sentenced to time served, 3 years of supervised probation and a portion of the $33,000 restitution. The other defendants remain to be sentenced. Sentencing guidelines suggest 8 to 33 months of incarceration and/or conditional probation, although they face potentially more than 20 years.

== See also ==
- Bryan Law
- Catonsville Nine
- Chicago Seven
- Civil disobedience
- Evangelical environmentalism
- Gainesville Eight
- Harrisburg Seven
- Jonah House
- Pitstop Ploughshares
- Ploughshares Fund
- The Baltimore Four
- Seeds of Hope
- The Camden 28
- The Saint Patrick's Day Four
- Thomas (activist)
- Trident Ploughshares
- Carol Gilbert
- Ardeth Platte
- Jackie Hudson
- Sister Megan Rice
- Vulnerability of nuclear plants to attack
- Dorothy Day
- Carl Kabat
- Martin Newell
- Ciaron O'Reilly
- Anne Montgomery (peace activist)
- David Eberhardt
