= Mark Colville (activist) =

American social justice activist

Mark Colville is an American social justice activist and Catholic worker. He is the founder of the Amistad Catholic Worker community in New Haven, Connecticut.

He is a graduate of Manhattan College with a major in religion and peace studies.

In 2014, he was sentenced to one year conditional discharge for demonstrating outside the gates of Hancock Field Air National Guard Base. Colville was protesting the drone attacks that are remotely controlled from the base.

Amistad provided support to New Haven's homeless during the Covid 19 epidemic.

He and his wife were 2019 New Haven Register Persons of the Year.

== Kings Bay Plowshares ==
On April 4, 2018, he took part in the Kings Bay Plowshares action.

He refused to post bail as participating in home confinement and wearing an ankle band violate his conscience.

== Personal life ==
He raised six children with his wife Luz Catarineau: Keeley, Soledad, Justin and Isaiah Colville, and Crystal and Mario Fernandez.
