= Kings Bay Plowshares =

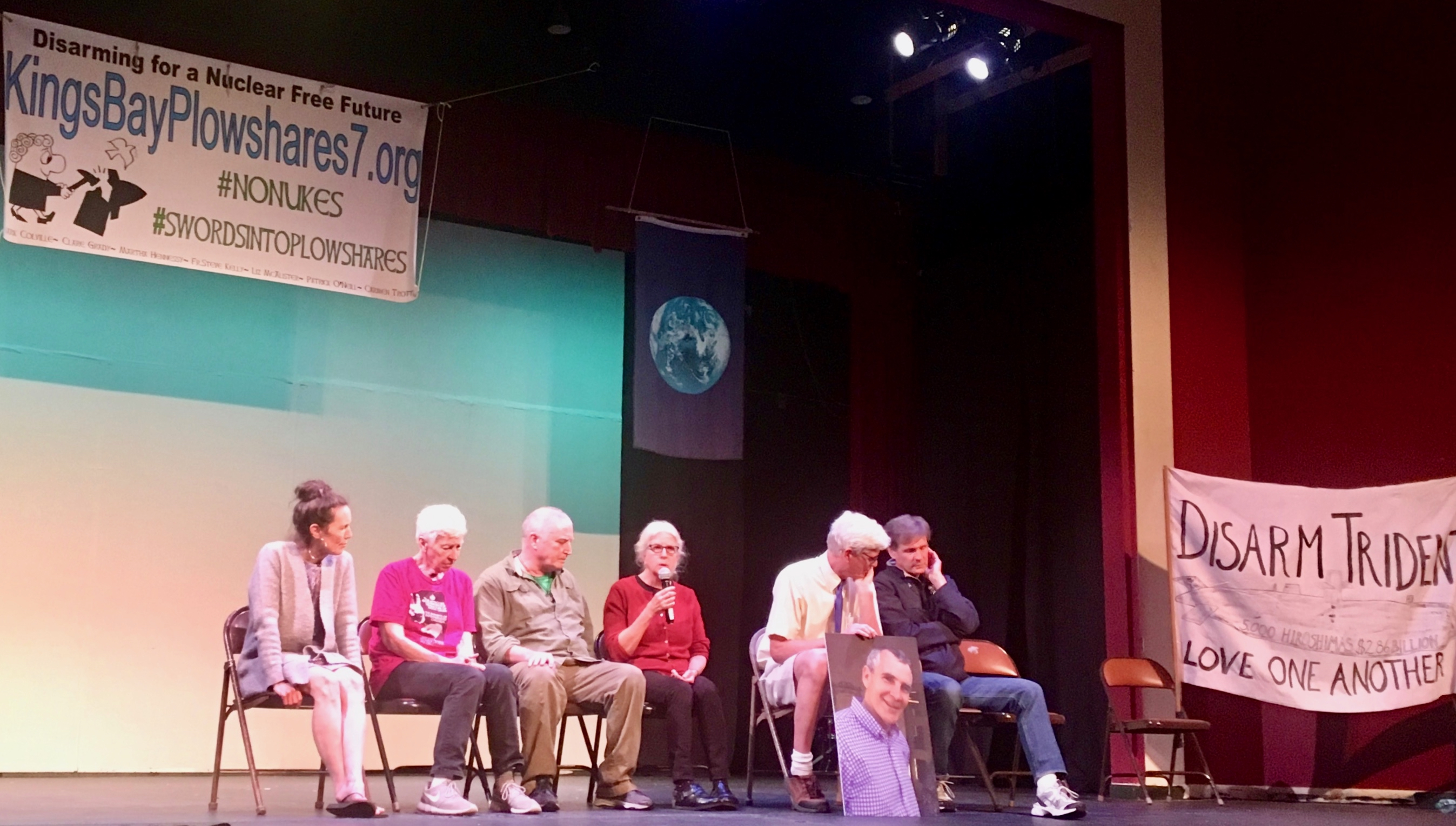
Six of the Kings Bay Plowshares 7

The Kings Bay Plowshares are a group of seven Catholic peace activists who broke into the Kings Bay Naval Submarine Base and carried out a symbolic act of protest against nuclear weapons. The name of the action and the wider anti-nuclear Plowshares movement comes from the prophet Isaiah’s command to "beat swords into plowshares."

== Kings Bay Naval Base ==
Kings Bay Naval Base is the home port to Submarine Squadron 20, with at least five Ohio-class ballistic missile submarines, each of which is capable of carrying 24 Trident II missiles with nuclear weapons.

== Action ==
On April 4, 2018, the group, dressed in black, cut a hole in a security fence and entered the naval base while singing and praying, and recording the action with body cams. They hung a banner that read "The Ultimate Logic of Trident: Omnicide", attached a poster of Martin Luther King Jr. to a model of a Trident II D5 ballistic missile, festooned the area with crime-scene tape, spray-painted "Love One Another" on the pavement, pounded a display of a Tomahawk missile with a hammer, and poured their own blood on an official seal of the base. One of them left an indictment against the United States, another left a copy of Daniel Ellsberg’s 2017 book The Doomsday Machine, and a third read Pope Francis’s statement denouncing nuclear weapons.

The activists were willingly arrested two hours after entering the base. They were jailed and charged with conspiracy, destruction of government property, depredation of a naval installation, and trespassing. Four of them were released on bail after two months, the other three remained in jail for more than a year.

== Trial ==
On October 21, 2019 the group went before a jury in a U.S. District Court in Brunswick, Georgia. They pled not guilty and the Seven insisted that they, in fact, had not entered the base to commit a crime, but entered in order to prevent one from occurring, the crime of "omnicide", the destruction of the human race which is possible in a nuclear war. In the face of this threat that the US nuclear arsenal poses to the world, they believed what they had done was not illegal, but a "symbolic disarmament", an act of civil resistance.

The seven were barred from citing their religious motivations in their defense. Judge Lisa Godbey Wood prevented all mention of the Religious Freedom Restoration Act. The seven were also prevented from mounting a "necessity defense", claiming that lawbreaking was necessary to prevent the far more severe crime of nuclear war. They could also not mention international law or treaties restricting nuclear weaponry.

On October 24, 2019, a federal grand jury found the seven guilty on three felony counts and a misdemeanor charge.

== The Kings Bay Plowshares Seven ==
- Carmen Trotta
- Patrick O'Neill
- Elizabeth McAlister
- Steve Kelly
- Martha Hennessy
- Clare Grady
- Mark Colville
