= Anne Montgomery (peace activist) =

American Catholic sister and peace activist

Sister Anne Montgomery RSCJ
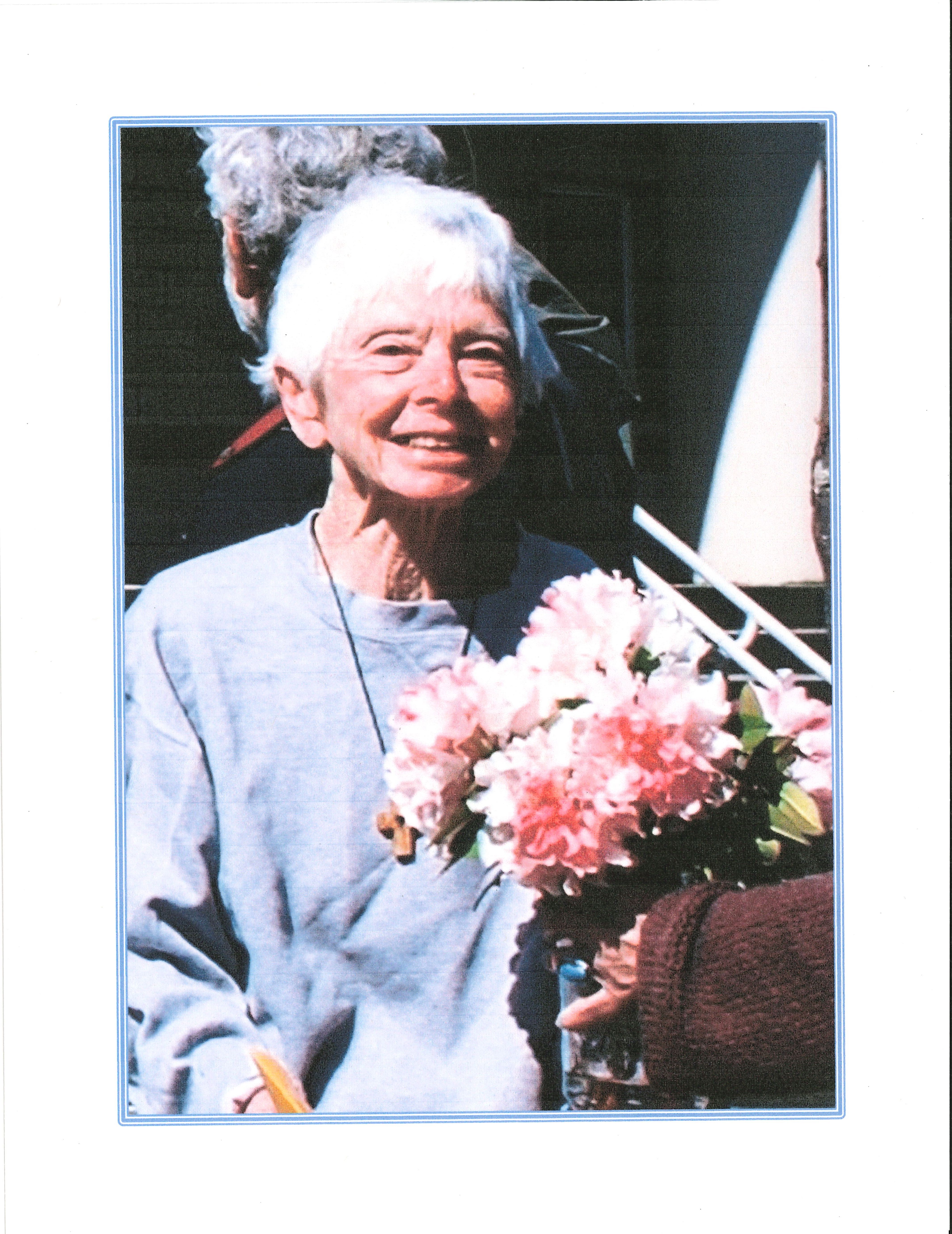

Personal life
- Born: November 30, 1926 San Diego, California
- Died: August 27, 2012 (aged 85)

Religious life
- Religion: Roman Catholic

Sister Anne Montgomery RSCJ (30 November 1926 – 27 August 2012) was an American non-violent activist, educator, nun, and poet who was part of the Plowshares movement. Aside from teaching, she worked with the poor, and advocated for peace via the Catholic Worker Movement. She was a member of the original Plowshares Eight in the first Plowshares action in 1980. Anne Montgomery House in Washington, D.C., run by the Society of the Sacred Heart for 10 years and closed in 2026, was named for her.

== Early life ==
Anne Montgomery was born on November 30, 1926, in San Diego California, the daughter of Alice Claire Montgomery and Alfred Eugene Montgomery. She had one sibling, an older brother who died on active duty when she was in the Sacred Heart novitiate (see Society of the Sacred Heart, below). Her father Alfred Montgomery was a career Naval officer who rose to the rank of Vice Admiral, leading the largest battle in the Pacific against Japanese war ships during World War II. The family moved a great deal during her childhood.

She attended Eden Hall Academy of the Sacred Heart in Torresdale, Pennsylvania and Manhattanville College, graduating with a bachelor's and master's degree. She later earned a second master's degree from Columbia University.

== Society of the Sacred Heart ==
In 1948, when Montgomery was 22 years old, she entered the Society of the Sacred Heart (RSCJ) in Albany. She made her first vows in 1951 and her final vows in 1956 in Rome. During the period of her novitiate she received news of her brother's death in a military training exercise for jet fighter planes.

She taught at the Convent of the Sacred Heart in New York City from 1959 to 1969 and at Street Academy of Albany in 1970. In 1975, she began educating children with learning disabilities. In the late 1970s, she returned to New York City to work with high school dropouts in East Harlem.

In the late 1970s, Montgomery joined the Catholic Worker House in New York, which was part of the Catholic Worker Movement. She was also a part of the Little Sisters of the Assumption in East Harlem. She became an advocate for peace, determined to disarm nuclear weapons using nonviolent tactics.

== Activism ==
=== Plowshares Movement ===
Civil disobedience is, traditionally, the breaking of a civil law to obey a higher law, sometimes with the hope of changing the unjust civil law. … But we should speak of such actions as divine obedience, rather than civil disobedience. The term ‘disobedience’ is not appropriate because any law that does not protect and enhance human life is no real law.

— Anne Montgomery, RSCJ, "Voice of the Day," Sojourners, March 3, 2011

In 1980, Montgomery joined the Plowshares Eight, an anti-nuclear weapons and Christian pacifist movement co-founded by Philip Berrigan, Liz McAlister, Daniel Berrigan, and others. The movement included activists such as Susan Crane and often consisted of members calling for the abolition of nuclear weapons. Some members of the movement damaged nuclear weapons and military bases to directly disarm the facilities. Montgomery was among the first that were arrested for these acts, and served time in prison. She participated in several other Plowshares movement actions, including one in 2009, at the age of 83. She was best known for insisting that her work was not civil disobedience, but divine obedience.

In 1987 Montgomery co-edited a book with Art Laffin, Swords into Plowshares: Nonviolent Direct Action for Disarmament, about the Plowshares movement, and nonviolent direct action for disarmament, peace, and social justice. In 2024 he co-edited a book of her poetry written in war zones and in prison (see the section below).

=== Other peace activism ===
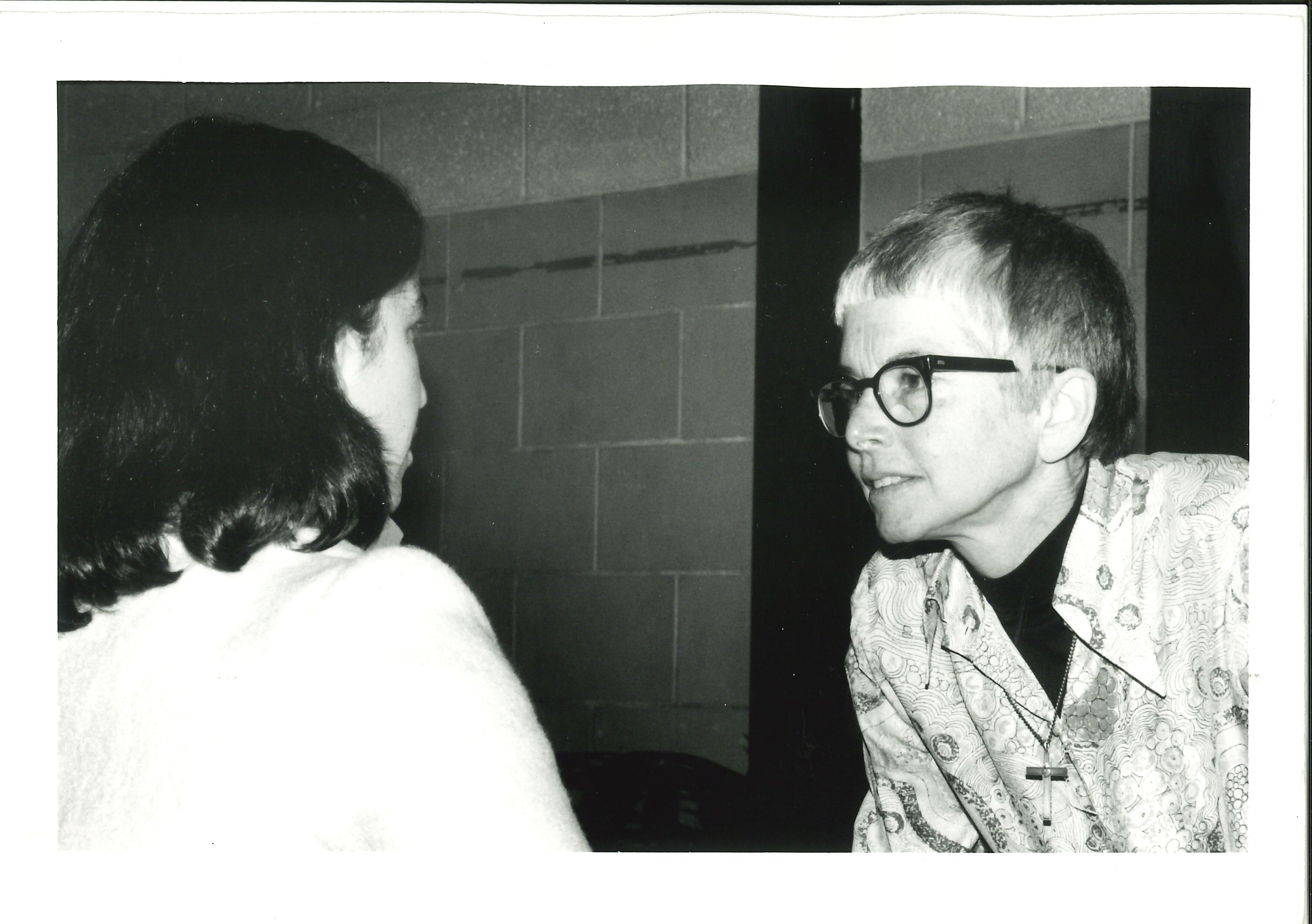
Anne Montgomery RSCJ in 1983 with a student in New York city.

In the late 1970s, Montgomery became a member of Pax Christi, a national Catholic peace movement. Throughout the 90s, she traveled with Community Peacemaker Teams (CPT, then known as Christian Peacemaker Teams) to places of conflict in Iraq, West Bank, Hebron, and the Balkans. In January 1991, she protested against the US bombing Iraq. She supported the Gulf Peace Team Camp on the Iraq-Saudi border which was there to provide a nonviolent presence before and during the initial stages of the war, and in 2000 she fasted for a month to show her disapproval of US support for the UN sanctions against Iraq. In 2005, she participated in a 70-mile walk and a four-day fast and vigil with the organization witness against torture, which worked toward the closing of the Guantanamo Naval Base.

== Later life and death ==
In 2012 Montgomery won the Courage of Conscience Award from the Peace Abbey in Sherborn, Massachusetts one week before her death. She died on August 27, 2012, at the age of 85 at Oakwood in Sacred Heart, Atherton, California.

== Poetry ==
A book of her poetry, ARISE AND WITNESS: Poems by Anne Montgomery, RSCJ, About Faith, Prison, War Zones and Nonviolent Resistance was published in September 2024 by her former co-editor, Arthur Laffin, with Carole Sargent. It won second place for poetry in the Catholic Media Awards for 2025. Martin Sheen featured it twice on his podcast. The editor of the poetry series at Scarith Press is Grace Cavalieri, poet laureate emerita of Maryland, and host of the Library of Congress series "The Poet and the Poem". Cavalieri writes that "This posthumous collection of poems by activist Anne Montgomery illuminates the heart of a woman who gave her every moment in service to impede ugliness, and to do God's work." Every living member of the original Plowshares 8 and some members of the Kings Bay Plowshares 7 contributed to it, including (alphabetically) Jackie Allen-Douçot, Frida Berrigan, Jim Douglass and Shelley Douglass, Clare Grady, Dean Hammer, Kathy Kelly, and Steve Kelly SJ.
