= David Kairys =

American lawyer (born 1943)

David Kairys (born April 16, 1943, in Baltimore, Maryland) is Professor of Law at Temple University School of Law. He is the first James E. Beasley Chair (2001–07).

Kairys is a civil rights lawyer. He authored Philadelphia Freedom: Memoir of a Civil Rights Lawyer and With Liberty and Justice for Some. He is a gun control proponent. He is also a strong advocate for removing money corruption from politics.

Kairys earned a B.S. from Cornell University (1965), an LL.B. from Columbia Law School (1968), and an LL.M. from the University of Pennsylvania Law School (1971). He specializes in constitutional law and civil rights law. He was a founding partner and is of counsel to Kairys, Rudovsky, Epstein, Messing & Rau.

Among his awards are the Alliance for Justice honor list for 2008, the Association of American Law Schools 2007 Deborah Rhode Award for extraordinary contribution to public interest by a law professor, the American Civil Liberties Union of Pennsylvania's Civil Liberties Award, the Poor Richard Club of Philadelphia Pro Bono Award, the Freil-Scanlan Award (best Temple law faculty scholarship), and the First James E. Beasley Chair (Temple Law School).
