= Prison Planet =

Prison Planet may refer to:

- Prison Planet, a 2008 album by the East Coast Avengers
- The Prison Planet, one of the primary settings of the Canadian television series Shadow Raiders
- Prisonplanet.com, a website formerly operated by American conspiracy theorist Alex Jones, now an ad for an online casino.
- Prison Planet Records, an American record label operated by members of the band Supagroup, which also released the band's early albums
- Salusa Secundus, a fictional planet in the Dune universe, designated the Imperial Prison Planet in the storyline
- An alternative title for The Survivors, a 1958 SF novel by Tom Godwin
- Earth, which according to Scientology teachings, is a "prison planet" used by the Marcab Confederacy

== See also ==
- Penal colony
