= Stowaway (2021 film) =

2021 film by Joe Penna

- Official release poster
- Directed by: Joe Penna
- Written by: Joe Penna; Ryan Morrison
- Produced by: Aram Tertzakian; Nick Spicer; Jonas Katzenstein; Maximilian Leo; Ulrich Schwarz; Clay Pecorin
- Starring: Anna Kendrick; Daniel Dae Kim; Shamier Anderson; Toni Collette
- Cinematography: Klemens Becker
- Edited by: Ryan Morrison
- Music by: Volker Bertelmann
- Production companies: XYZ Films; Augenschein Filmproduktion; Rise Pictures; RainMaker Films
- Distributed by: Netflix (select countries); Wild Bunch (Germany)
- Release date: April 22, 2021
- Running time: 116 minutes
- Countries: United States; Germany
- Language: English
- Budget: $10 million

Stowaway is a 2021 sci-fi drama thriller film directed by Joe Penna, who co-wrote the screenplay with Ryan Morrison. It stars Anna Kendrick, Daniel Dae Kim, Shamier Anderson and Toni Collette. A co-production of the United States and Germany, it premiered on Netflix in select countries on April 22, 2021.

== Plot ==
Mission Commander Marina Barnett, biologist David Kim, and medical researcher Zoe Levenson lift off aboard MTS-42, on a two-year mission to Mars. Once underway, the upper stage of their launch vehicle is connected by 450-meter tethers to the ship's main hull, acting as a counterweight for inertia-based artificial gravity.

Shortly after takeoff, Barnett discovers launch support engineer Michael Adams, an accidental stowaway, unconscious between two modules, entangled with a device that scrubs carbon dioxide from the air on the ship. As he falls, the device is inadvertently destroyed.

The crew is forced to use emergency lithium hydroxide canisters to scrub CO_{2} from the air. Unfortunately, the canisters cannot sustain the extra load. Barnett orders David to immediately cultivate his algae experiment on the ship, rather than at the Martian colony as planned. Only half of the algae survive, providing just enough oxygen for a third crew member. Without another oxygen supply, the crew of four will asphyxiate weeks before reaching Mars.

Barnett asks mission control for a solution that will save all four passengers, but the only option—an untested EVA (spacewalk) to climb the tethers and recover liquid oxygen from the spent upper stage rocket—is deemed too risky. Barnett and David begin to come to terms with sacrificing Michael, but Zoe convinces them to wait ten days for mission control to think of another solution.

After three days, David breaks rank to explain the situation to Michael, offering him a painless lethal injection. Michael nearly takes his own life, but Zoe stops him and convinces him to hold out for a while longer. She insists on climbing the tethers to retrieve the liquid oxygen. David reveals that the rest of the algae has died, leaving only enough oxygen for two. Now facing the death of two passengers, he agrees to join her on the climb.

Zoe and David perform the EVA and jury rig a solution to fill two cylinders, enough to sustain two more passengers. However, deadly radiation from a high-energy solar flare—a coronal mass ejection—forces them to leave one of the cylinders behind. They make it back to the ship, but due to a critical equipment failure, the single oxygen cylinder is lost.

After regrouping, they realize that the large tank continues to leak oxygen due to the improvised connection, and that if one person exposes themselves to the lethal radiation to retrieve the cylinder left behind on the first attempt, the other three can survive. Marina must survive to pilot the ship, but the other three all volunteer to make the sacrifice.

As Michael is untrained and both he and David have families back home, Zoe ultimately insists on doing it herself. She manages to fill and return the cylinder to the ship before succumbing to radiation poisoning. She spends her final moments outside the ship, gazing at a faint Mars amongst the stars.

== Cast ==
- Anna Kendrick as Zoe Levenson, the ship's doctor
- Toni Collette as Marina Barnett, the ship commander
- Daniel Dae Kim as David Kim, the ship's biologist
- Shamier Anderson as Michael Adams, a launch support engineer and the eponymous stowaway

== Production ==
In October 2018, it was announced Anna Kendrick was cast to appear in Joe Penna's next film, starring as a medical researcher. In January 2019, Toni Collette was added to the cast as the ship commander. In May, Shamier Anderson was cast as the titular stowaway, and Daniel Dae Kim joined as the ship's biologist.

Filming began on June 11, 2019, in Cologne and Munich and wrapped after 30 days.

Retired NASA astronaut Daniel T. Barry, space tether expert Dr. Robert P. Hoyt, and YouTuber and science communicator Scott Manley served as consultants for the film.

== Release ==
In November 2018, Sony Pictures Worldwide Acquisitions acquired the film's international distribution rights, excluding the United States. In December 2020, Netflix acquired distribution rights, acquiring territories previously purchased by Sony, with Amazon Prime Video set to distribute in Canada. The film was released on April 22, 2021, except in German-speaking countries; there, the Netflix release followed cinema showings, which could not be conclusively scheduled due to the ongoing COVID-19 pandemic.

== Reception ==
On review aggregator website Rotten Tomatoes, Stowaway holds an approval rating of 76% based on 110 reviews, with an average rating of 6.5/10. The site's critics consensus reads, "Pacing problems prevent Stowaway from fully engaging, but it's distinguished by its thoughtful, well-acted approach to a story built on an excruciating moral dilemma." Metacritic assigned the film a weighted average score of 63 out of 100 based on 24 critics, indicating "generally favorable reviews". The film ranks on Rotten Tomatoes' Best Science Fiction Movies of 2021.

== See also ==
- "Breaking Strain", 1949 Arthur C. Clarke short story
- "The Cold Equations", 1954 Tom Godwin short story
