= Breaking Strain =

Short story by Arthur C. Clarke

- Short story by Arthur C. Clarke
- Country: United Kingdom
- Language: English
- Genre: Science fiction

Publication
- Published in: Thrilling Wonder Stories
- Publisher: Standard Magazines
- Publication date: 1949

"Breaking Strain", also known as "Thirty Seconds - Thirty Days", is a science fiction short story by English writer Arthur C. Clarke, first published in 1949. It was adapted into a movie in 1994 under the title Trapped in Space.

== Plot summary ==
This shipwreck survival drama involves a space freighter on Earth/Venus run. A meteor hit during the middle of the voyage has drained most on-board oxygen supplies. The two crew members (Grant and McNeil) realize they will not have enough oxygen for the two of them to complete the trip.

The two crew members live a few days in exclusion from each other, independently considering plans for survival. The story is primarily told from Grant's perspective (the ship's captain), who becomes frustrated with McNeil's apparent inconsiderate behavior. Eventually Grant realizes that there is enough oxygen on board for one crew member to finish the trip. He struggles with the idea of deciding who will live or die, though all the while believes he has more to live for than his seemingly selfish partner. As he becomes more and more frustrated with his crewmate, he decides to poison McNeil in order to save himself. Grant poisons McNeil's drink and sits down to a meal with him, waiting for him to die. However, McNeil reveals that he foresaw the murder and replaced the ship's poison with a bitter salt, so that he could detect its presence if Grant tried to use it.

McNeil confronts Grant on the subject of suicide and the two men concur that an agreement must be made—and that a message to Venus sent on ahead beforehand to validate their actions—deciding who will suicide so that the other live. The short story ends with a retrospective retelling of the decision process by McNeil (the survivor), who is rescued after being alone aboard his space freighter for three weeks.

== Reception ==
Groff Conklin in 1954 said that "Breaking Strain" was "shockingly tragic".

== Influence ==
The ship in "Breaking Strain" shares several similarities with Discovery One in the 1968 film and Clarke's 1968 novel, 2001: A Space Odyssey. Both ships have a spherical command module which is located a great distance away from the nuclear powered engines of the ship, connected by a long spine.

The story was the inspiration for Breaking Strain, the first novel in the Venus Prime series by Paul Preuss.

== Publication ==
"Breaking Strain" was included in Clarke's 1953 anthology, Expedition to Earth, and in his 1983 anthology, The Sentinel.

== See also ==
- "The Cold Equations", 1954 short story
- Stowaway, 2021 film
