= The Cold Equations =

Science fiction short story by Tom Godwin

- Short story by Tom Godwin
- Genre: science fiction

Publication
- Published in: Astounding
- Publication type: magazine
- Publication date: August 1954

"The Cold Equations" is a science fiction short story by American writer Tom Godwin (1915–1980), first published in Astounding Magazine in August 1954. In 1970, the Science Fiction Writers of America selected it as one of the best science-fiction short stories published before 1965, and it was therefore included in The Science Fiction Hall of Fame, Volume One, 1929–1964. It has been widely anthologized and dramatized.

== Plot summary ==
In the year 2178, a small Emergency Dispatch Ship (EDS) is launched from the interstellar cruiser Stardust to deliver desperately needed medicine to the frontier planet Woden. The EDS pilot, Barton, soon discovers a stowaway: 18-year-old Marilyn Lee Cross.

By law, all EDS stowaways are to be jettisoned because an EDS carries only enough fuel to complete its mission with the pilot as sole occupant; any excess mass jeopardizes the mission and pilot. Marilyn wanted merely to visit her brother Gerry on the remote planet and was unaware of the law. When she saw the "UNAUTHORIZED PERSONNEL KEEP OUT!" sign while she was sneaking onboard, she thought that at most she would have to pay a fine if caught.

Barton sadly explains to her that her additional weight would make it impossible to land safely; they would crash on the planet, killing both them and the colonists needing the medicine. After recovering from her shock and horror, and contacting Gerry, Marilyn willingly climbs into the airlock and is ejected into space.

== Development ==
The story was shaped by Astounding Science Fiction editor John W. Campbell, who sent "Cold Equations" back to Godwin three times before he got the version he wanted because "Godwin kept coming up with ingenious ways to save the girl!" Campbell's biographer Alec Nevala-Lee noted in 2016 that the story was published at a time when Campbell had embraced contrarianism on the basis that (in Campbell's words) there was "no viewpoint that has zero validity—though some have very small validity, or very limited application." Nevala-Lee also revealed that Campbell described the story as a "gimmick on the proposition 'human sacrifice is absolutely unacceptable'. So we deliberately, knowingly and painfully sacrifice a young, pretty girl... and make the reader accept that it is valid!"

== Reception ==
Richard Harter wrote a detailed analysis of the story in 1977, with special attention to the possible negligence of those who designed the situation in which dilemmas like this could occur, and how this paralleled similar concerns involving industrial safety legislation.

Writer Don Sakers' short story "The Cold Solution" deconstructs the premise. In 1992 it was awarded "the readers' favorite" Analog short story of 1991.

In 1996, critic and engineer Gary Westfahl wrote that because the story's premise is based on systems that were built without adequate margin for error, the story is "good physics", but "lousy engineering", and that it frustrated him so much he decided it had been "not worth [his] time".

In 2014, writer Cory Doctorow made a similar argument: he sees the situation presented in the story as an example of a "moral hazard". Doctorow notes that the constraints under which the characters operate are decided by the writers, and not "the inescapable laws of physics". He argues that the decision of the writer to give the vessel no margin of safety and a critical supply of fuel, and to focus readers' attention onto the necessity of tough decisions at a time of crisis rather than mulling over the responsibility for proper planning from the outset, is intellectually dishonest and that this and other stories "about how we can't afford to hew to our values in time of crisis are a handy addition to every authoritarian's playbook". Five years later, as part of a wider essay criticizing Campbell's views, Doctorow condemned him for "lean[ing] hard" on Godwin to turn the story "into a parable about the foolishness of women and the role of men in guiding them to accept the cold, hard facts of life".

Adam Roberts, in the 2016 edition of The History of Science Fiction, finds the story to be inherently right-wing on similar grounds. In Roberts's view, both the decision to present the sacrifice as the only possible outcome and the decision to portray it as "a tragic necessity occasioned by physics, as opposed to the moral delinquency of the company that built a spaceship without extra supplies of fuel or other fail-safe device" are ideologically charged. Roberts concludes that "The trolley-problem of 'The Cold Equations' is a shibboleth, in the strict sense that it serves to call forth a specific, ideological-tribal reaction."

== Precursors ==
There was a similar concept in a number of earlier stories:

The Encyclopedia of Science Fiction points to A Plunge into Space (Robert Cromie, 1890) as having a subplot very similar to "The Cold Equations". "A Weighty Decision" (Al Feldstein in Weird Science, 1952) and the story "Precedent" (E. C. Tubb in New Worlds, 1952) also have been cited as potential inspirations. In all three, as in "The Cold Equations", a stowaway must be ejected from a spaceship because the fuel aboard is only sufficient for the planned mission mass.

David Drake stated "The plot is lifted directly from 'A Weighty Decision,' a story in the May–June, 1952, issue of the EC comic Weird Science. I don't believe that coincidence could have created plots so similar in detail" and ends with "The plot is such an obvious steal from the comic that I think Godwin would have concealed it better if he hadn't intended to use a completely different ending. I can also imagine that Godwin wouldn't have expressed his qualms at changing the ending to Campbell, who wouldn't have winked at direct plagiarism. (Not that EC had any legitimate gripe: Bill Gaines laughed in later years about the way he and his staff at EC stole plots from SF stories and ran them without credit.)"

== Dramatic adaptations ==
=== Radio plays ===
- The story was also adapted into an episode of the radio program X Minus One in 1955. In a 1958 episode of Exploring Tomorrow, the stowaway is a woman trying to visit her husband to make amends for an affair.
- Another adaptation featured as a part of Faster Than Light on CBC Radio's Sunday Showcase in September 2002 by Joe Mahoney. The program was hosted by science fiction writer Robert J. Sawyer.

=== Film and television ===
- An adaptation of the story aired on the 1962 British anthology series Out of This World and starred Peter Wyngarde and Jane Asher. The episode was lost soon after broadcast, but an audio-only recording has survived and is available on DVD.
- Another television adaptation aired as part of the 1985–1989 revival of The Twilight Zone.
- Episode 8 of the anime Martian Successor Nadesico is named for and takes elements from the story.
- The story formed the basis for a 1996 made-for-TV movie starring Billy Campbell and Poppy Montgomery, which aired on the Sci-Fi Channel.
- It is the basis of the award-winning 2014 short film, "The Stowaway", which was released on YouTube.
- A similar premise is used for the 2021 film Stowaway.

== Awards ==
Tied for 9th place in Astounding/Analog magazine's 1971 All-Time Poll short fiction category.

Placed 8th in the 1999 Locus Awards for best novelette.

== Publication history ==
Original publication:

- Godwin, Tom; Freas (illus.) (August 1954). "The Cold Equations". Astounding Science Fiction. Vol. LIII, no. 6. New York City: Street & Smith Publications. pp. 62–84.

The following anthologies have included "The Cold Equations":

- The Science Fiction Hall of Fame, Volume One, 1929–1964 (1970) edited by Robert Silverberg.
- Modern Science Fiction (Anchor Books, 1974) edited by Norman Spinrad.
- In Dreams Awake: A Historical-Critical Anthology of Science Fiction (Dell, 1975) edited by Leslie A. Fiedler.
- The Road to Science Fiction #3: From Heinlein to Here (Signet, 1979) edited by James E. Gunn.
- The Great SF Stories: 16 (1954) (DAW Books, 1987) edited by Isaac Asimov, Martin H. Greenberg.
- The Ascent of Wonder: The Evolution of Hard SF (Tor Books, 1994) edited by David G. Hartwell and Kathryn Cramer.
- The World Turned Upside Down (Baen Books, 2005) edited by David Drake, Eric Flint and Jim Baen.

== See also ==
- Factor of safety
- Trolley problem
- Tunnel problem
