= Alexander Holmes =

Alexander Holmes may refer to:

- A pseudonym of the Hungarian-American writer Hans Habe (1911–1977)
- The crewman convicted of manslaughter in United States v. Holmes, a case about crew actions following the sinking of the William Brown (1841)
- Alex Holmes (born 1981), American football player
