= The World Turned Upside Down (anthology) =

2005 short story anthology

- Cover of first edition
- Author: edited by David Drake, Eric Flint and Jim Baen
- Cover artist: Tom Kidd
- Language: English
- Genre: Science fiction, fantasy
- Publisher: Baen Books
- Publication date: 2005
- Publication place: United States
- Media type: Print (hardcover)
- Pages: 743 pp.
- ISBN: 0-7434-9874-7
- OCLC: 56617258
- Dewey Decimal: 813.0876208
- LC Class: PS648.S3 W647 2005

The World Turned Upside Down is an anthology of science fiction and fantasy short stories edited by David Drake, Eric Flint and Jim Baen. It was first published in hardcover and ebook by Baen Books in January 2005; a Science Fiction Book Club edition followed from Baen Books/SFBC in February of the same year. The first paperback edition was issued by Baen in June 2006.

The book collects twenty-nine novellas, novelettes and short stories by various authors, together with a preface by Flint and a short introduction to each story by one of the editors.

== Contents ==
- "Preface" (Eric Flint)
- "Rescue Party" (Arthur C. Clarke)
- "The Menace from Earth" (Robert Heinlein)
- "Code Three" (Rick Raphael)
- "Hunting Problem" (Robert Sheckley)
- "Black Destroyer" (A. E. van Vogt)
- "A Pail of Air" (Fritz Leiber)
- "Thy Rocks and Rills" (Robert Ernest Gilbert)
- "A Gun for Dinosaur" (L. Sprague de Camp)
- "Goblin Night" (James H. Schmitz)
- "The Only Thing We Learn" (C. M. Kornbluth)
- "Trigger Tide" (Wyman Guin)
- "The Aliens" (Murray Leinster)
- "All the Way Back" (Michael Shaara)
- "The Last Command" (Keith Laumer)
- "Who Goes There?" (John W. Campbell)
- "Quietus" (Ross Rocklynne)
- "Answer" (Fredric Brown)
- "The Last Question" (Isaac Asimov)
- "The Cold Equations" (Tom Godwin)
- "Shambleau" (C. L. Moore)
- "Turning Point" (Poul Anderson)
- "Heavy Planet" (Lee Gregor)
- "Omnilingual" (H. Beam Piper)
- "The Gentle Earth" (Christopher Anvil)
- "Environment" (Chester S. Geier)
- "Liane the Wayfarer" (Jack Vance)
- "Spawn" (P. Schuyler Miller)
- "St. Dragon and the George" (Gordon R. Dickson)
- "Thunder and Roses" (Theodore Sturgeon)
