= Seven Waves Away =

1957 film by Richard Sale

- US theatrical release poster
- Directed by: Richard Sale
- Screenplay by: Richard Sale
- Based on: Seven Waves Away; 1938 short story by Richard Sale
- Produced by: John R. Sloan
- Starring: Tyrone Power; Mai Zetterling; Lloyd Nolan; Stephen Boyd
- Cinematography: Wilkie Cooper
- Edited by: Raymond Poulton
- Music by: Arthur Bliss
- Production company: Copa Productions
- Distributed by: Columbia Pictures
- Release dates: 3 December 1957 (London); 17 April 1957 (New York City)
- Running time: 97 minutes
- Countries: United Kingdom; United States
- Language: English

Seven Waves Away (alternate U.S. titles: Abandon Ship! and Seven Days From Now) is a 1957 British drama directed by Richard Sale and starring Tyrone Power, Mai Zetterling, Lloyd Nolan, and Stephen Boyd. After his cruise ship hits a mine and with the captain dead, an officer has to make an agonizing decision on an overcrowded lifeboat.

Richard Sale adapted the film from his 1938 short story of the same name, originally published by Scribner's Magazine. The plot has similarities to the real-life sinking of the American ship William Brown in 1841. The William Brown hit an iceberg 250 miles off Newfoundland and lost 31 of its 65 passengers. Two boats with 17 crewmen and the remaining passengers escaped the wreck, but more than a dozen passengers were sacrificed from the crowded longboat.

Though there is no direct acknowledgment by the filmmakers, the film ends with a voice-over stating, "The story which you have just seen is a true one. In real life, Captain [sic] Alexander Holmes was brought to trial on a charge of murder. He was convicted and given the minimum sentence of six months because of the unusual circumstances surrounding the incident."

== Plot ==
After striking a derelict mine in the Atlantic Ocean, the luxury liner SS Crescent Star sinks in seven minutes, taking with her nearly all of the 1,156 people on board. Twenty-seven of the survivors and a dog converge in a single lifeboat designed to accommodate only nine people. The dying captain passes command to executive officer Alec Holmes. Holmes then learns from "Sparks" Clary, the ship's radio operator, that both transmitters were destroyed before an SOS signal could be sent. When Holmes organizes shifts between the men in the water hanging on the side and those in the boat, Edith Middleton insists on taking a turn in the sea. Her lover Mr. Hayden swamps the boat when he fails to listen to instructions, but everyone is brought back aboard. Holmes and Mr. McKinley talk about the impossibility of rowing a boat this heavy any distance at all, much less to the nearest land, Africa, 1,500 miles away.

The mortally injured ship's engineer, Frank Kelly, warns Holmes that he must "evict some of the tenants" if anyone is to survive – "anyone who can't pay the rent, like me". Holmes is horrified and rejects the idea. "I thought you had guts enough to save half of them, instead of losing them all," Kelly replies. Later in the night, Cookie thinks he sees light on the water. They fire a flare, but there is no response. The passengers talk revealingly about themselves and why they were on the cruise. Mr. Wilson, in the water, is found to have died.

With a major storm approaching, Kelly tells Holmes' girlfriend, nurse Julie, "be kind to him when it happens." Kelly struggles to his feet, points to the dying and the sick aboard and calls on Holmes to save those he can, then sacrifices himself by jumping overboard. Holmes tries to save him, but he goes under.

As the gale worsens, Holmes eventually decides to take responsibility for choosing. And it will not be "women and children first". Some people are already dying of their injuries. When he orders officer Will McKinley to slip the first of these, an unconscious woman, Mrs. Spencer, over the side, McKinley protests and then goes overboard to receive her in his arms.

Mr. Hayden is knocked overboard by accident and drowns, but Holmes sends others to certain death, until there are 15 left aboard. Only those capable of rowing to Africa, and a young boy who represents the future, will survive. Mrs. Middleton observes that an atomic scientist, a brilliant playwright, and a famous former opera singer have been sacrificed to save two "apemen", a racketeer, and a devout coward, and asks, including herself, "Why are the wicked so strong?"

Passenger Michael Faroni demands that Holmes go back for the others. Holmes refuses (it is impossible anyway) and Faroni wounds him in the shoulder by throwing a switchblade and is in turn shot dead with a flare gun.

As Holmes predicted, the sea becomes a "nightmare" through which they row, relentlessly. The lightened lifeboat weathers the storm and the rest of the survivors thank Holmes for saving them. Realising he is now a liability due to his infected wound, Holmes refuses water and passes command to Clary. Holmes throws himself overboard, but they bring him back. Then, they hear a foghorn and see a ship emerging from the fog. As it comes to pick them up, Edith Middleton murmurs, "Too soon, Just a little bit too soon, brave captain." The survivors, with the exception of Julie and Middleton, quickly repudiate Holmes' actions. As Holmes climbs aboard on the rope ladder, alone, a voiceover says: "The story which you have just seen is a true one. In real life, Captain Alexander Holmes was brought to trial on a charge of murder. He was convicted and given the minimum sentence of six months because of the unusual circumstances surrounding the incident. If you had been a member of the jury, how would you have voted, guilty or innocent?" The question, "Guilty or innocent?", in large bold letters, lingers on the screen, while the camera remains trained on the lifeboat, floating empty and adrift.

== Cast ==
- Tyrone Power as Executive Officer Alec Holmes
- Mai Zetterling as Julie White
- Lloyd Nolan as Frank Kelly
- Stephen Boyd as Will McKinley
- Moira Lister as Edith Middleton
- James Hayter as "Cookie" Morrow
- Marie Lohr as Dorothy Knudson
- Finlay Currie as Mr. Wheaton
- John Stratton as Jimmy "Sparks" Clary
- Victor Maddern as Willy Hawkins
- David Langton as John Hayden
- Eddie Byrne as Michael Faroni
- Noel Willman as Aubrey Clark
- Moultrie Kelsall as Daniel Cane
- Robert Harris as Arthur J. Middleton
- Gordon Jackson as John Merritt
- Orlando Martins as Sam Holly

== Reception ==
According to Kinematograph Weekly the film was "in the money" at the British box office in 1957.

== See also ==
- Souls at Sea, a 1937 Henry Hathaway film also based on the William Brown incident
- Lifeboat, 1944 Alfred Hitchcock film
- Survival film, about the film genre, with a list of related films
- RMS Lady Hawkins a passenger vessel whose story is similar with an overcrowded lifeboat
