= Souls at Sea =

1937 film by Henry Hathaway

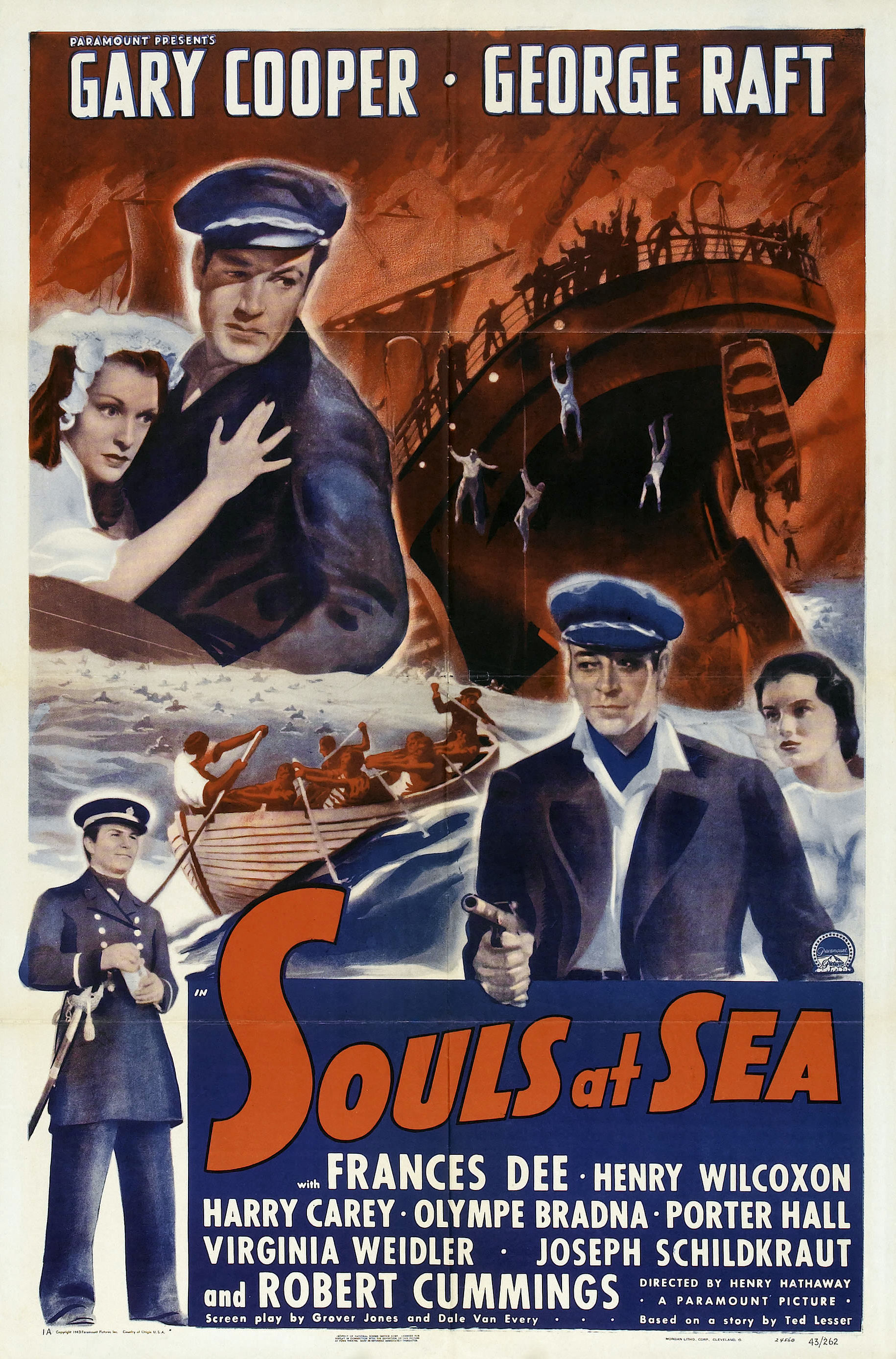
- Theatrical release poster
- Directed by: Henry Hathaway
- Screenplay by: Grover Jones; Dale Van Every
- Story by: Ted Lesser
- Produced by: Henry Hathaway; Grover Jones; Adolph Zukor
- Starring: Gary Cooper; George Raft; Frances Dee
- Cinematography: Charles Lang
- Edited by: Ellsworth Hoagland
- Music by: W. Franke Harling; Milan Roder
- Production company: Paramount Pictures
- Distributed by: Paramount Pictures
- Release dates: August 9, 1937 (New York City)); September 3, 1937 (U.S.)
- Running time: 92 minutes
- Country: United States
- Language: English

Souls at Sea is a 1937 American historical adventure film directed by Henry Hathaway and starring Gary Cooper and George Raft. Based on a story by Ted Lesser, the film is about a first mate on a slave ship who frees the slaves on the ship after a mutiny overthrows the ship's captain. The title of this film was spoofed in the Laurel and Hardy comedy film Saps at Sea (1940). The supporting cast features Frances Dee, Harry Carey, Joseph Schildkraut, Robert Cummings, George Zucco, Tully Marshall, Monte Blue, and an uncredited Alan Ladd and Edward Van Sloan.

== Plot ==
Abolitionist Michael "Nuggin" Taylor goes undercover to sabotage slave ships. Although the United States prohibited the importation of slaves in 1808, slaves are still being brought into the country illegally. Great Britain also prohibited the slave trade, putting the Royal Navy into action against slave traders, but Royal Navy Lieutenant Stanley Tarryton is acting for the slave traders. The conflict between Taylor and Tarryton is complicated by Tarryton's sister Margaret, who is falling in love with Taylor.

The Taylor-Tarryton conflict becomes entangled with the loss of the ship William Brown. The William Brown is accidentally set on fire by a little girl, and must be abandoned. Taylor is a passenger on the ship, and he takes command of the evacuation when the captain is injured. Only one lifeboat is launched, which cannot carry all the survivors, many of whom are swimming in the ocean nearby. Taylor stops these desperate people from climbing into the lifeboat and swamping it, shooting some with a pistol. As a result, he is subsequently tried and convicted for murder; Barton Woodley explains his actions, thus resulting in a new trial for Taylor. Margaret, seeing Taylor in this new light, lets him know she still loves him.

== Cast ==
- Gary Cooper as Michael "Nuggin" Taylor
- George Raft as Powdah
- Frances Dee as Margaret Tarryton
- Henry Wilcoxon as Lieutenant Stanley Tarryton
- Harry Carey as Captain of the "William Brown"
- Olympe Bradna as Babsie
- Porter Hall as Court Prosecutor
- Virginia Weidler as Tina
- Joseph Schildkraut as Gaston de Bastonet
- Robert Cummings as George Martin
- George Zucco as Barton Woodley
- Gilbert Emery as Captain Martisel
- Lucien Littlefield as Toymaker
- Paul Fix as Violinist
- Tully Marshall as Pecora
- Monte Blue as Mate
- Stanley Fields as Captain Paul M. Granley
- Arthur Blake as Prime Minister
- Olaf Hytten as Proprietor (uncredited)
- Alan Ladd as Sailor (uncredited)
- Harry Tenbrook as Lifeboat Crewman (uncredited)
- Edward Van Sloan as Ship's Officer (uncredited)
- Charles Middleton as Jury Foreman (uncredited)

== Production ==
The film was made during the period of the studio system; when George Raft initially turned down his part, he was suspended. Lloyd Nolan and Anthony Quinn stood by to replace him. Raft agreed to play the role when it was rewritten to be more sympathetic.

Cummings was cast in October 1936.

Filming began 9 November 1936.

In November 1936, silent film star John Bowers heard that his old friend Henry Hathaway was directing Gary Cooper in Souls at Sea off the shore of Santa Catalina. On November 17, the 50-year-old actor rented a sixteen-foot sloop and sailed to the island, hoping to land a part in the picture, only to learn that it had already been cast. Bowers never returned to shore, and his corpse was found on the beach at Santa Monica, California. Bowers' life and death is identified as inspiration for the character Norman Maine in A Star Is Born (1937).

=== Historical influence ===
The real William Brown hit an iceberg and sank on 19 April 1841, with loss of life. A seaman, one Alexander Holmes, acted similarly to Taylor's actions in the film. He was convicted in 1842 of manslaughter, but sentenced only to a $20 fine ($670 today) and six months imprisonment.

== Reception ==
Frank S. Nugent of The New York Times did not think the film was worthy of serious analysis but described it as "a proper tale of high adventure on the high seas." Variety called it "a good picture" with "bold, brave and sweeping" direction. Harrison's Reports praised the "outstanding" production but found the scenes of beatings and killings to be "sadistic" rather than entertaining. John Mosher of The New Yorker called the film "a disappointment", finding a crowded lifeboat scene to be exciting but remarking that the story seemed to be "lost in a maze of plot fidgeting."

== Academy Award nominations ==
Hans Dreier and Roland Anderson were nominated for Best Art Direction; Hal Walker for Best Assistant Director (in the last year it was awarded); and Boris Morros, as head of the Paramount Studios Music Department, for Music (scoring) (score by W. Franke Harling and Milan Roder).

== See also ==
- Seven Waves Away (1957) – also dealt with the limits of lifeboat space and decisions of the first mate
