= Rule of Rescue =

Ethics term for a specific questionably rational human response

The Rule of Rescue is a term coined by A.R. Jonsen in 1986 that is used in a variety of bioethics contexts:

- 'a perceived duty to save endangered life where possible' (Bochner et al. 1994, p. 901)
- 'the sense of immediate duty that people feel towards those who present themselves to a health service with a serious condition' (Nord et al. 1995, p. 90)
- 'an ethical imperative to save individual lives even when money might be more efficiently spent to prevent deaths in the larger population' (Dougherty 1993, p. 1359)
- 'the powerful human proclivity to rescue a single identified endangered life, regardless of cost, at the expense of any nameless faces who will therefore be denied health care' (Osborne & Evans 1994, p. 779)

== Criticism ==
The Rule of Rescue is heavily attacked by Shepley Orr and Jonathan Wolff in their article "Reconciling cost-effectiveness with the rule of rescue: the institutional division of moral labour". They argue the application of the rule leads to injustice and a suboptimal health outcome under the constraint of limited resources. They plead for strict application of cost-effectiveness analysis (QALYs) as solid base of decision making with priorities.

In order to avoid framing doctors in an "inhuman role" of deciding at the patients' bedside on the basis of cost effectiveness, they plead for "division of labour" between governments/institutions that allocate the resources on basis of cost effectiveness and doctors who try to save lives within given constraints, for which constraints they are not held personally responsible or liable.

Orr and Wolff conclude: "The rule of rescue has a strong intuitive pull. It seems to express our common humanity, and to refuse a rescue on grounds of cost appears morally horrendous, even in cases that do not share all the paradigm features of the rule of rescue. Yet at the same time in a complex, resource-constrained world, cost-effectiveness cannot be ignored. The two types of reasoning appear irreconcilable. We believe, however, that this appearance is misleading, and ordinary processes of medical decision making show how to reconcile the two. Resource allocation decision making broadly follows cost-effectiveness analysis (CEA), while emergency room and related 'bedside' decision-making is much closer to rescue reasoning. There is good reason for this division of labour, although we have conceded that this simple picture does need to be modified to accommodate the different ways in which both styles of reasoning take place in both venues. Nevertheless, the key point remains: cost-effectiveness analysis is needed to decide which tools of rescue to provide. Rescue can then take place in a manner apparently unconstrained by cost."

"Reconciling the rule of rescue with cost-effectiveness" is important during pandemics. Most states have ignored cost-effectiveness analysis in applying lockdowns and delaying regular medical interventions with the "Rule of rescue"-argument during the 2020–2021 COVID-19 pandemic.

Orr and Wolff in 2014 profoundly argued that the "Rule of rescue" is the result of wrong reasoning. Cost-effectiveness reasoning with the aid of QALYs always leads to morally superior outcomes and optimal public health outcome, given constraints of resources and competing interests. In an unconstrained situation without conflicting interests, the rule of rescue leads to rightly perceived results, without causing (macro) problems.

== See also ==
- A Theory of Justice
- Prioritarianism
- Social equity
- Triage
- Trolley problem
- Utilitarianism
