= Trolley problem =

Thought experiment in ethics

The trolley problem presents a dilemma: is it preferable to pull the lever to divert the runaway trolley onto the side track with just one person?

The trolley problem is a thought experiment in moral philosophy and moral psychology with many variations, involving hypothetical ethical dilemmas about whether to sacrifice one person to save a larger number of people. The series usually begins with a scenario in which a runaway trolley (tram) or train is on course to collide with and kill a number of people (traditionally five) tied to the tracks, but a driver or bystander can intervene and divert the vehicle to kill just one person on a different track. Then other variations of the runaway vehicle, and analogous life-and-death dilemmas (medical, judicial, etc.) are posed, each containing the option either to do nothing—in which case several people will be killed—or to intervene and sacrifice one initially "safe" person to save the others.

Opinions on the ethics of each scenario turn out to be sensitive to details of the story that may seem immaterial to the abstract dilemma. The question of formulating a general principle that can account for the differing judgments arising in different variants of the story was raised in 1967 as part of an analysis of debates on abortion and the doctrine of double effect by the English philosopher Philippa Foot. Later dubbed "the trolley problem" by Judith Jarvis Thomson in a 1976 article that catalyzed a large literature, the subject refers to the meta-problem of why different judgements are arrived at in particular instances.

Thomson and the philosophers Frances Kamm and Peter Unger have analyzed the trolley problem extensively. Thomson's 1976 article initiated the literature on the trolley problem as a subject in its own right. Characteristic of this literature are colourful and increasingly absurd alternative scenarios in which the sacrificed person is instead pushed onto the tracks as a way to stop the trolley, has his organs harvested to save transplant patients, or is killed in more indirect ways that complicate the chain of causation and responsibility.

Earlier forms of individual trolley scenarios antedated Foot's publication. Frank Chapman Sharp included a version in a moral questionnaire given to undergraduates at the University of Wisconsin in 1905. In this variation, the railway's switchman controlled the switch, and the lone individual to be sacrificed (or not) was the switchman's child. The German philosopher of law Karl Engisch discussed a similar dilemma in his habilitation thesis in 1930, as did the German legal scholar Hans Welzel in a work from 1951. In his commentary on the Talmud, published in 1953, Avrohom Yeshaya Karelitz considered the question of whether it is ethical to deflect a projectile from a larger crowd toward a smaller one. Similarly, in The Strike, a television play broadcast in the United States on 7 June 1954, a commander in the Korean War must choose between ordering an air strike on an encroaching enemy force, at the cost of his own 20-man patrol unit; and calling off the strike, risking the lives of the main army of 500 men.

Beginning in 2001, the trolley problem and its variants have been used in empirical research on moral psychology. It has been a topic of popular books. Trolley-style scenarios also arise in discussing the ethics of autonomous vehicle design, which may require programming to choose whom or what to strike when a collision appears to be unavoidable. More recently, the trolley problem has also become an Internet meme.

== Original dilemma ==
Philippa Foot's version of the thought experiment, now known as the "trolley driver", ran as follows:

Suppose that a judge or magistrate is faced with rioters demanding that a culprit be found for a certain crime and threatening otherwise to take their own bloody revenge on a particular section of the community. The real culprit being unknown, the judge sees himself as able to prevent the bloodshed only by framing some innocent person and having him executed. Beside this example is placed another in which a pilot whose airplane is about to crash is deciding whether to steer from a more to a less inhabited area. To make the parallel as close as possible, it may rather be supposed that he is the driver of a runaway tram, which he can only steer from one narrow track on to another; five men are working on one track and one man on the other; anyone on the track he enters is bound to be killed. In the case of the riots, the mob have five hostages, so that in both examples, the exchange is supposed to be one man's life for the lives of five.

— Philippa Foot

A utilitarian view asserts that it is obligatory to steer to the track with one man on it. According to classical utilitarianism, such a decision would be not only permissible, but, morally speaking, the better option (the other option being no action at all). This fact makes diverting the trolley obligatory.

An alternative viewpoint is that since moral wrongs are already in place in the situation, moving to another track constitutes a participation in the moral wrong, making one partially responsible for the death when otherwise no one would be responsible. An opponent of action may also point to the incommensurability of human lives.

Under some interpretations of moral obligation, simply being present in this situation and being able to influence its outcome constitutes an obligation to participate. If this is the case, then doing nothing would be considered an immoral act.

== Empirical research ==
In 2001 the psychologist Joshua Greene and colleagues published the results of the first significant empirical investigation of people's responses to trolley problems. Using functional magnetic resonance imaging, they demonstrated that "personal" dilemmas (like pushing a man off a footbridge) preferentially engage brain regions associated with emotion, whereas "impersonal" dilemmas (like diverting the trolley by flipping a switch) preferentially engaged regions associated with controlled reasoning. On these grounds, they advocate for the dual-process account of moral decision-making. Since then, numerous other studies have employed trolley problems to study moral judgement, investigating topics like the role and influence of stress, emotional state, impression management, levels of anonymity, different types of brain damage, physiological arousal, different neurotransmitters, and genetic factors on responses to trolley dilemmas.

Trolley problems have been used as a measure of utilitarianism, but their usefulness for such purposes has been criticized.

In 2017 a group led by Michael Stevens, a YouTuber known for his brand Vsauce, performed the first realistic trolley-problem experiment. Subjects were placed alone in what they thought was a train-switching station, and shown footage they believed to be real (but was pre-recorded) of a train going down a track, with five workers on the main track, and one on the secondary track; the participants had the option to pull the lever to divert the train toward the secondary track. Five of the seven participants did not pull the lever.

=== Survey data ===
The trolley problem has been the subject of many surveys in which about 90% of respondents have chosen to kill the one and save the five. If the situation is modified where the one sacrificed for the five was a relative or romantic partner, respondents are much less likely to be willing to sacrifice the one life.

A 2009 survey by David Bourget and David Chalmers shows that 68% of professional philosophers would switch (sacrifice the one individual to save five lives) in the case of the trolley problem, 8% would not switch, and the remaining 24% had another view or could not answer.

=== Criticism ===
In a 2014 paper published in the Social and Personality Psychology Compass, researchers criticized the use of the trolley problem, arguing, among other things, that the scenario it presents is too extreme and unconnected to real-life moral situations to be useful or educational.

In her 2017 paper, Nassim Jafari Naimi lays out the reductive nature of the trolley problem in framing ethical problems that serves to uphold an impoverished version of utilitarianism. She argues that the popular argument that the trolley problem can serve as a template for algorithmic morality is based on fundamentally flawed premises that serve the most powerful with potentially dire consequences on the future of cities.

In his book On Human Nature (2017) Sir Roger Scruton criticizes the usage of ethical dilemmas such as the trolley problem and their usage by philosophers such as Derek Parfit and Peter Singer as ways of illustrating their ethical views. Scruton writes, "These 'dilemmas' have the useful character of eliminating from the situation just about every morally relevant relationship and reducing the problem to one of arithmetic alone." Scruton believes that just because one would choose to change the track so that the train hits the one person instead of the five does not mean that they are necessarily a consequentialist. As a way of showing the flaws in consequentialist responses to ethical problems, Scruton points out paradoxical elements of belief in utilitarianism and similar beliefs. He believes that Robert Nozick's experience machine thought experiment definitively disproves hedonism. In his 2017 article The Trolley Problem and the Dropping of Atomic Bombs, Masahiro Morioka considers the dropping of atomic bombs as an example of the trolley problem and points out that there are five "problems of the trolley problem", namely, 1) rarity, 2) inevitability, 3) safety zone, 4) possibility of becoming a victim, and 5) the lack of perspective of the dead victims who were deprived of freedom of choice.

In a 2018 article published in Psychological Review, researchers pointed out that, as measures of utilitarian decisions, sacrificial dilemmas such as the trolley problem measure only one facet of proto-utilitarian tendencies, namely permissive attitudes toward instrumental harm, while ignoring impartial concern for the greater good. As such, the authors argued that the trolley problem provides only a partial measure of utilitarianism.

== Applicability in legal reasoning ==
The trolley problem has been widely discussed in legal theory as a means of exploring how law distinguishes between intentional harm, omission, and necessity. In criminal law, the scenario illustrates the tension between utilitarian and deontological approaches to culpability: while a utilitarian might justify diverting the trolley to minimise deaths, legal systems often treat deliberate killing as impermissible regardless of the net outcome. This distinction reflects the act–omission doctrine, under which a failure to prevent harm is generally less blameworthy than actively causing it.

In English common law, courts have traditionally rejected the defence of necessity in cases involving the deliberate taking of life, even where doing so would save others. The leading precedent is R v Dudley and Stephens (1884), in which shipwrecked sailors were convicted of murder after killing a cabin boy to survive. The decision is often cited as a legal analogue to the trolley problem, emphasising that moral calculations of greater good do not justify intentional killing under the law.

In tort law and regulatory policy, however, trolley-like reasoning appears in cost–benefit analyses where harm is balanced against risk reduction—such as in product design, environmental regulation, or accident prevention. The U.S. decision in United States v. Carroll Towing Co. (1947) articulated a formula weighing the burden of precautions (B) against the probability (P) and gravity (L) of potential harm (B < PL), effectively institutionalizing a utilitarian calculus within negligence law.

More recent legal discussions have introduced the Trolley Problem into the legal regulatory framework for autonomous vehicles. As autonomous driving technology advances, legal scholars have begun to focus on how vehicle decisions in unavoidable collision scenarios are coded, and the potential legal liabilities that such coding may trigger.

== Related problems ==
Five cases of the trolley problem: the original Switch, the Fat Man, the Fat Villain, the Loop, and the Man in the Yard

The basic Switch form of the trolley problem also supports comparison to other, related dilemmas:

=== The Fat Man ===
As before, a trolley is hurtling down a track towards five people. You are on a bridge under which it will pass, and you can stop it by putting something very heavy in front of it. As it happens, there is a fat man next to you – your only way to stop the trolley is to push him over the bridge and onto the track, killing him to save five. Should you proceed?

Resistance to this course of action seems strong; when asked, a majority of people will approve of pulling the switch to save a net of four lives, but will disapprove of pushing the fat man to save a net of four lives. This has led to attempts to find a relevant moral distinction between the two cases.

One possible distinction could be that in the first case, one does not intend harm towards anyone – harming the one is just a side effect of switching the trolley away from the five. However, in the second case, harming the one is an integral part of the plan to save the five. This solution is essentially an application of the doctrine of double effect, which says that one may take action that has bad side effects, but deliberately intending harm (even for good causes) is wrong. So, the action is permissible even if the harm to the innocent person is foreseen, so long as it is not intended. This is an argument which Shelly Kagan considers (and ultimately rejects) in his first book The Limits of Morality.

=== The Fat Villain ===
This variation is similar to The Fat Man, with the additional assertion that the fat man who may be pushed is a villain who is responsible for the whole situation: the fat man was the one who tied five people to the track, and sent a trolley in their direction with the intention of killing them. In this variation, a majority of people are willing to push the fat man.

Unlike in the previous scenario, pushing the fat villain to stop the trolley may be seen as a form of retributive justice or self-defense.

== Implications for autonomous vehicles ==
Variants of the original "trolley driver" dilemma arise in the design of software to control autonomous cars. Situations are anticipated where a potentially fatal collision appears to be unavoidable, but in which choices made by the car's software, such as into whom or what to crash, can affect the particulars of the deadly outcome. For example, should the software value the safety of the car's occupants more, or less, than that of potential victims outside the car.

A platform called Moral Machine was created by MIT Media Lab to allow the public to express their opinions on what decisions autonomous vehicles should make in scenarios that use the trolley problem paradigm. Analysis of the data collected through Moral Machine showed broad differences in relative preferences among different countries. Other approaches make use of virtual reality to assess human behaviour in experimental settings. However, some argue that the investigation of trolley-type cases is not necessary to address the ethical problem of driverless cars, because the trolley cases have a serious practical limitation. It would need to be a top-down plan in order to fit the current approaches of addressing emergencies in artificial intelligence. Automotive engineers also often argue that the preferable solution is to try to avoid the dilemma entirely: to program the car to obey applicable traffic laws and practice defensive driving at a safe speed and with adequate following distance for road conditions, so that the brakes and/or steering can be applied in time to prevent any collision.

Also, a question remains of whether the law should dictate the ethical standards that all autonomous vehicles must use, or whether individual autonomous car owners or drivers should determine their car's ethical values, such as favoring safety of the owner or the owner's family over the safety of others. Although most people would not be willing to use an automated car that might sacrifice themselves in a life-or-death dilemma, some believe the somewhat counterintuitive claim that using mandatory ethics values would nevertheless be in their best interest. According to Jan Gogoll and Julian F. Müller, "the reason is, simply put, that [personalized ethics settings] would most likely result in a prisoner's dilemma."

In 2016 the German federal government appointed a commission to study the ethical implications of autonomous driving. The commission adopted 20 rules to be implemented in the laws that will govern the ethical choices that autonomous vehicles will make. Relevant to the trolley dilemma is this rule:

8. Genuine dilemmatic decisions, such as a decision between one human life and another, depend on the actual specific situation, incorporating "unpredictable" behaviour by parties affected. They can thus not be clearly standardized, nor can they be programmed such that they are ethically unquestionable. Technological systems must be designed to avoid accidents. However, they cannot be standardized to a complex or intuitive assessment of the impacts of an accident in such a way that they can replace or anticipate the decision of a responsible driver with the moral capacity to make correct judgements. It is true that a human driver would be acting unlawfully if he killed a person in an emergency to save the lives of one or more other persons, but he would not necessarily be acting culpably. Such legal judgements, made in retrospect and taking special circumstances into account, cannot readily be transformed into abstract/general ex ante appraisals and thus also not into corresponding programming activities. …

== The Good Place ==
The trolley problem has also been prominently used in popular culture, notably in the American television series The Good Place. Its second-season episode "The Trolley Problem" (2017) has the ethics professor Chidi Anagonye introduce the dilemma and several of its variants to the other characters. When the neighborhood architect, Michael, finds the thought experiment too abstract, he creates increasingly realistic simulations in which Chidi must make the decisions himself, including the choice between diverting a trolley to kill one person or allowing five people to die. The episode uses these scenarios to explore distinctions between deontological and utilitarian reasoning, as well as the difference between theoretical moral reasoning and decisions made when confronted with apparently real consequences.

== See also ==
- Carry-On
- Kobayashi Maru
- City on the Edge of Forever
- Lesser of two evils principle
- Lifeboat ethics
- Omission bias
- R v Dudley and Stephens
- Rule of Rescue
- The Case of the Speluncean Explorers § Similar real cases
- Tunnel problem
- Violinist (thought experiment)
- Virtue ethics
