= R v Dudley and Stephens =

1884 English criminal case

Coordinates: 27°10′S 9°50′W

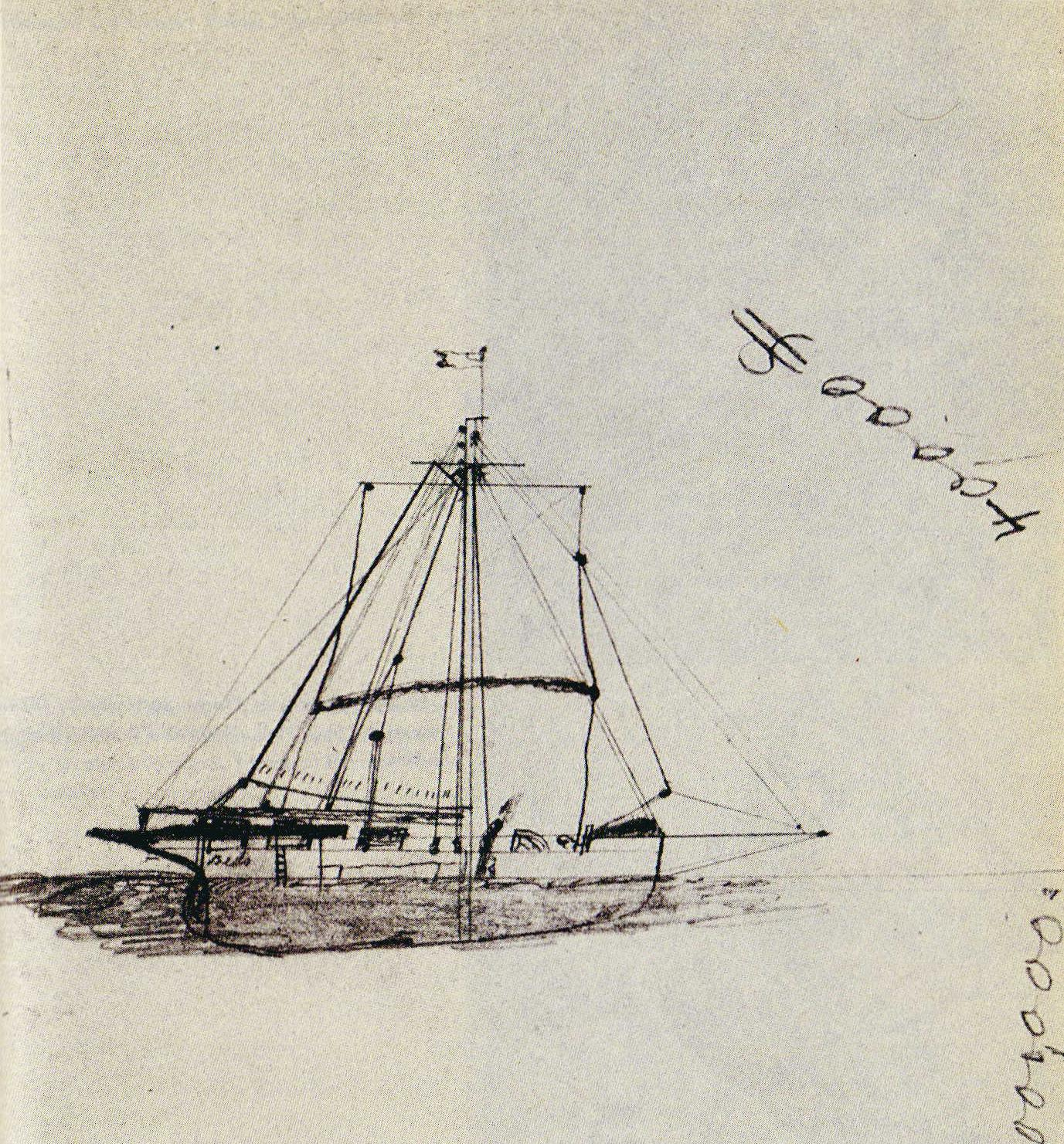
- Sketch of the Mignonette by Tom Dudley
- Court: High Court of Justice (Queen's Bench Division)
- Full case name: Her Majesty The Queen v Tom Dudley and Edwin Stephens
- Decided: 9 December 1884
- Citations: [1884] EWHC 2 (QB); (1884) 14 QBD 273 (DC); 49 JP 69; 54 LJMC 32; 15 Cox CC 624; 33 WR 437; [1881–1885] All ER Rep 61; 52 LT 107; 1 TLR 118

Case history
- Prior action: Finding of the facts only: jury trial at Exeter Assizes
- Subsequent action: none

Court membership
- Judges sitting: Lord Coleridge, Lord Chief Justice; Mr Justice Grove; Mr Justice Denman; Lord Pollock; Lord Huddleston

Case opinions
- Lord Coleridge, Lord Chief Justice

Keywords
- Murder; Killing and eating flesh of human being under pressure of hunger; Necessity; Special verdict; Certiorari; Offence on the high seas; Jurisdiction of the High Court

R v Dudley and Stephens (1884) 14 QBD 273, DC is a leading English criminal case which established a precedent throughout the common law world that necessity is not a defence to a charge of murder. The case concerned survival cannibalism at sea following a shipwreck and the question of whether killing someone is acceptable if one's own survival is at stake.

In 1884, the four-man crew of the wrecked yacht Mignonette were cast adrift in a small lifeboat without provisions. After nearly three weeks at sea, and with little hope of rescue, two of the crew, Tom Dudley and Edwin Stephens, decided that in order to save their own lives they would need to kill and eat the ship's 17-year-old cabin boy Richard Parker, who by that time had fallen seriously ill after drinking seawater. The defendants were found guilty and were sentenced to the statutory death penalty, though with a recommendation of mercy. They were released soon after the conviction.

The case marked the culmination of a long history of attempts by the law, in the face of a bank of public opinion sympathetic to famished castaways, to outlaw the custom of cannibalism (cases of which were little publicised until after the death of perpetrators) and it became a legal cause célèbre in late 19th-century Britain, particularly among mariners.

== Facts ==
The yacht Mignonette was a 19.43 net t., 52-foot (16 m) cruiser built in 1867. It was an inshore boat, not made for long voyages. Australian lawyer Jack Want purchased it in 1883 for leisure. The vessel could at decent cost be transported to Australia by sailing, but its size and the 15,000-mile (24,000-km) voyage daunted attempts that year to find a suitable crew. It left Southampton on 19 May 1884 bound for Sydney with a crew of:

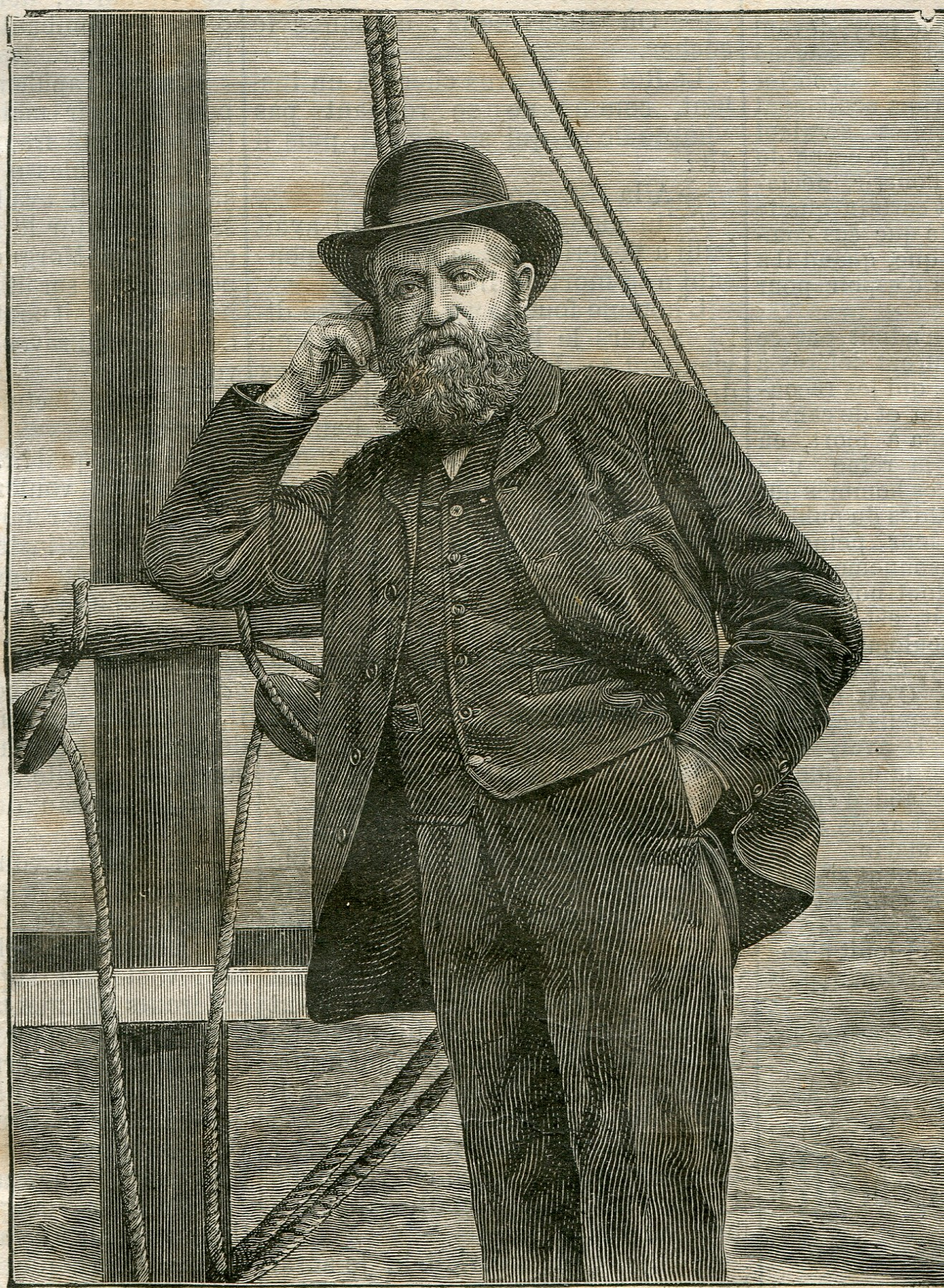
Captain Dudley, commander of the Mignonette

1. Tom Dudley (1853–1900), the captain;
2. Edwin Stephens (1847–1914);
3. Edmund Brooks (1846–1919); and
4. Richard Parker (c.1867–1884) the cabin boy. Parker was 17 years old and an inexperienced seaman.

On 5 July, Mignonette was running before a gale, around 1,600 miles (2,600 km) northwest of the Cape of Good Hope. The vessel was not struggling and Dudley gave the order to heave to so that the crew could enjoy a good night's sleep. As the manoeuvre was completed, and Parker was sent below to prepare tea, a wave struck and washed away the lee bulwark.

Dudley instantly realised that the yacht was doomed and ordered the single 13-foot (4 m) lifeboat to be lowered. The lifeboat was of flimsy construction, with boards only 0.25 inches (6 mm) thick and was holed in the haste to get it away. Mignonette sank within five minutes of being struck and the crew abandoned ship for the lifeboat, managing only to salvage vital navigational instruments along with two tins of turnips and no fresh water. Theories abound of the structural inadequacies of Mignonette that could not withstand the onslaught of a gale.

Dudley managed to improvise a sea anchor to keep the lifeboat headed into the waves and maintain her stability. Over the first night, the crew had to fight off a shark with their oars. They were around 700 miles (1,100 km) from the nearest land, Saint Helena or Tristan da Cunha. Dudley kept the first tin of turnips until 7 July when its five pieces were shared among the men to last for two days. On or around 9 July, Brooks spotted a turtle, which Stephens dragged on board. This yielded about three pounds (1.4 kg) of meat each plus the bones, which, along with the second tin of turnips, lasted until 15 or 17 July. They were unable to drink its blood after it became contaminated with seawater. The crew failed to catch any rainwater and by 13 July, with no other viable source of liquid, they began to drink their own urine. It was probably on 20 July that Parker became ill through drinking seawater. Stephens also became unwell, possibly from the same cause.

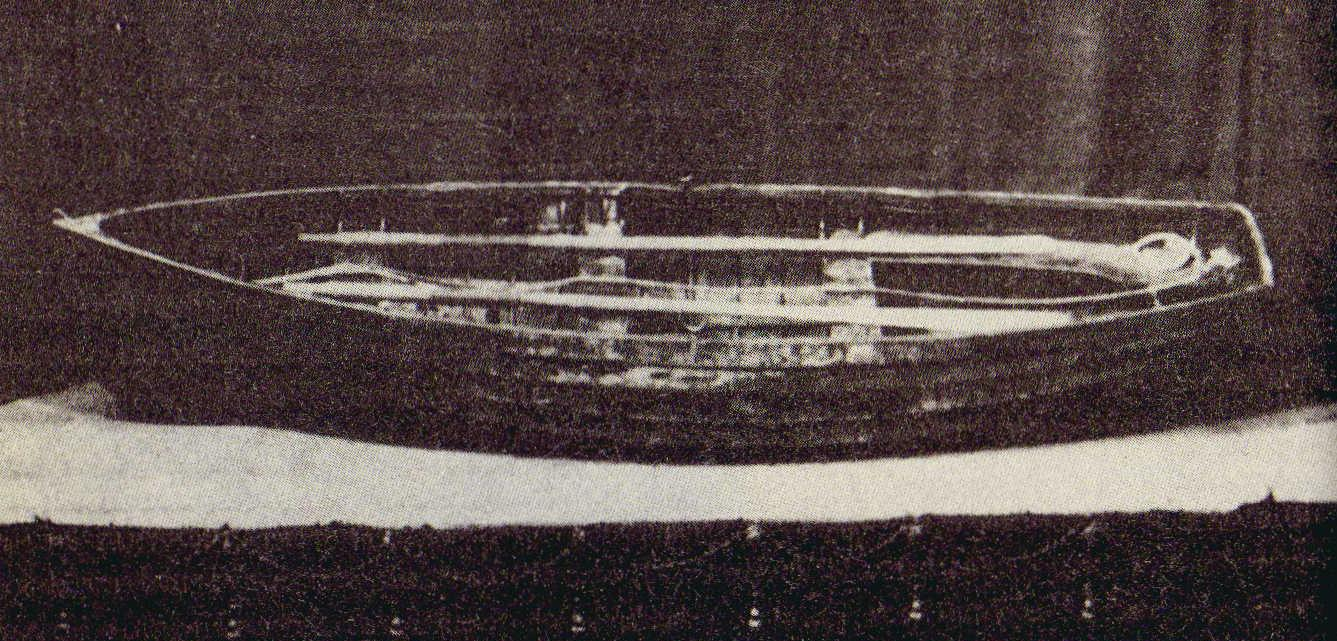
Photograph of the lifeboat exhibited at Falmouth in 1884

Drawing lots to choose a victim who would die to feed the others was possibly first discussed on 16 or 17 July, and debate seems to have intensified on 21 July but without a resolution. On 23 or 24 July, with Parker probably in a coma, Dudley told the others that it was better that one of them die so that the others would survive and that they should draw lots. Brooks refused. That night, Dudley again raised the matter with Stephens pointing out that Parker was probably dying and that he and Stephens had wives and families. They agreed to leave the matter up until the morning.

The following day, with no prospect of a rescue in sight, Dudley and Stephens silently signalled to each other that Parker would be killed. Killing Parker before his natural death would mean blood to drink. Brooks, who had not been party to the earlier discussion, claimed to have signalled neither assent nor protest; Dudley always insisted that Brooks had assented. Dudley said a prayer and, with Stephens standing by to hold the youth's legs if he struggled, pushed his penknife into Parker's jugular vein, killing him.

In some of the varying and confused later accounts of the killing, Parker murmured, "What me?" as he was slain. The three fed on Parker's body, with Dudley and Brooks consuming the most and Stephens very little. The crew also finally managed to catch some rainwater. Dudley later described the scene, "I can assure you I shall never forget the sight of my two unfortunate companions over that ghastly meal. We all was like mad wolfs who should get the most, and for men—fathers of children—to commit such a deed, we could not have our right reason." The crew sighted a sail on 29 July.

== Rescue and arraignment ==
Dudley, Stephens and Brooks were picked up by the German sailing barque Moctezuma, which returned the men to Falmouth, Cornwall, England, on 6 September en route to its destination in Hamburg. On arrival in Falmouth, the survivors attended the customs house and Dudley and Stephens entered statutory statements under the Merchant Shipping Acts, required in the event of a shipping loss. All three were candid, with Dudley and Stephens believing that their acts were justified by necessity – the need to ensure their own survival by practising cannibalism at sea as a last resort before starvation.

The duty police sergeant of the Falmouth Harbour Police, James Laverty, was near the depositions and overheard the statement given to the customs officer. He later questioned Dudley about the means by which he had killed Parker, taking custody of the knife and promising to return it. The depositions were telegraphed to the Board of Trade and to the Registrar General of Shipping in Basinghall Street in London. While the survivors were making arrangements to rejoin their families, Basinghall Street advised the men be detained. The Board of Trade gave conflicting advice to take no action but informed the Home Office, which was closed for the weekend. Laverty sought warrants for the men's arrest for murder on the high seas, which he obtained later that day from the mayor, Henry Liddicoat.

Dudley, Stephens and Brooks were held in the police station until their appearance before magistrates on 8 September. Dudley appears to have been confident that the magistrates would dismiss the charges. Liddicoat visited the men to apologise for the inconvenience but all magistrates had recently been instructed to seek advice from the Treasury Solicitor in all murder cases and the clerk probably prompted Laverty to ask for a remand in custody and adjournment while advice was sought. Local solicitor Harry Tilly appeared for the men and requested bail but after the magistrates, including Liddicoat, had consulted, they were returned to the police cells until Friday.

By Wednesday, the file had been passed to Home Secretary Sir William Harcourt. That day Harcourt consulted with Attorney General Sir Henry James and Solicitor General Sir Farrer Herschell. Harcourt took the decision to prosecute, the system having not clarified the law given the events of James Archer (see below).

By the time of bench appearance on Friday, public opinion in Falmouth had swung behind the defendants, especially after Parker's brother Daniel, also a seaman, appeared in court and shook hands with the three. The case was re-adjourned until 18 September, granting bail, the Home Office having hinted that this would be appropriate. The three men returned to their homes while the case began to appear across the British and international press. It soon became clear that consensus lay on the side of the defence. Harcourt was disgusted by the public's sentiment and became even more intent on a conviction.

William Otto Adolph Julius Danckwerts, a barrister of only six years' call but a specialist in wreck inquiries, was briefed for the prosecution but soon realised that public sentiment and the lack of evidence posed formidable difficulties. The only witnesses were the three defendants themselves and their right to silence would impede any formal proceedings. A confession was only admissible against the person making it, not his co-defendants and the contents of the depositions were probably inadequate to convict.

When the case was heard by the magistrates at the courthouse in Falmouth on 18 September, Danckwerts told the court that he intended to offer no evidence against Brooks and requested that he be discharged so that he could be called as a witness for the prosecution. There is no evidence that Brooks had been canvassed about this and the magistrates agreed. Danckwerts opened the prosecution case and called as witnesses those who had heard the survivors' stories and Brooks. The magistrates committed Dudley and Stephens to trial during the winter days of assizes in Exeter but extended their bail.

== Legal background and precedent ==
Prior to 1884, questions of the morality, ethics, and legality of taking of another's life to increase one's own chance of survival had arisen in several legal cases across British and other common law jurisdictions.

=== Saint Christopher case ===
In the early 17th century, seven Englishmen in the Caribbean embarked on an overnight voyage from Saint Christopher Island but were blown out to sea and lost for 17 days. During this time, starving, they cast lots to see who would sacrifice his own life for the others. The lot fell to the man who had suggested the scheme, and he consented to his subsequent killing. His body sustained the rest until they made their way to Saint Martin. They were returned to Saint Christopher, where they were put on trial for homicide. The judge pardoned them, their crime being "washed away" by "inevitable necessity".

This case was cited in the defence. Its first detailed summary in a learned British publication was in a post-1884 medical work, not in any law reports.

=== Essex ===
In 1820 the surviving crew of the American whaleship Essex consumed the bodies of seven of their shipmates to stay alive; six died of starvation and exposure except for Owen Coffin, who lost the lottery and was shot and eaten. The captain volunteered to take Coffin's place but he refused, saying it was his "right" to do so that the others might live.

=== U.S. v. Holmes ===
In 1841, the U.S. ship William Brown sank after hitting an iceberg. Crewmen, including seaman Alexander Holmes, believed that their overloaded lifeboat was in danger of sinking and put 14 or 16 passengers overboard far offshore in the frigid water. On his return to Philadelphia, Holmes was arrested and charged with murder. The grand jury rejected the indictment and substituted manslaughter. The judge in the United States District Court for the Eastern District of Pennsylvania instructed the jury that necessity might be a complete defence but that "before the protection of the law of necessity can be invoked, a case of necessity must exist, the slayer must be faultless, he must owe no duty to the victim." The jury convicted Holmes and the principle of necessity was not tested by any higher court. He was sentenced to six months and a $20 fine. Holmes was subsequently pardoned by President John Tyler. The defence also cited this case.

=== James Archer ===
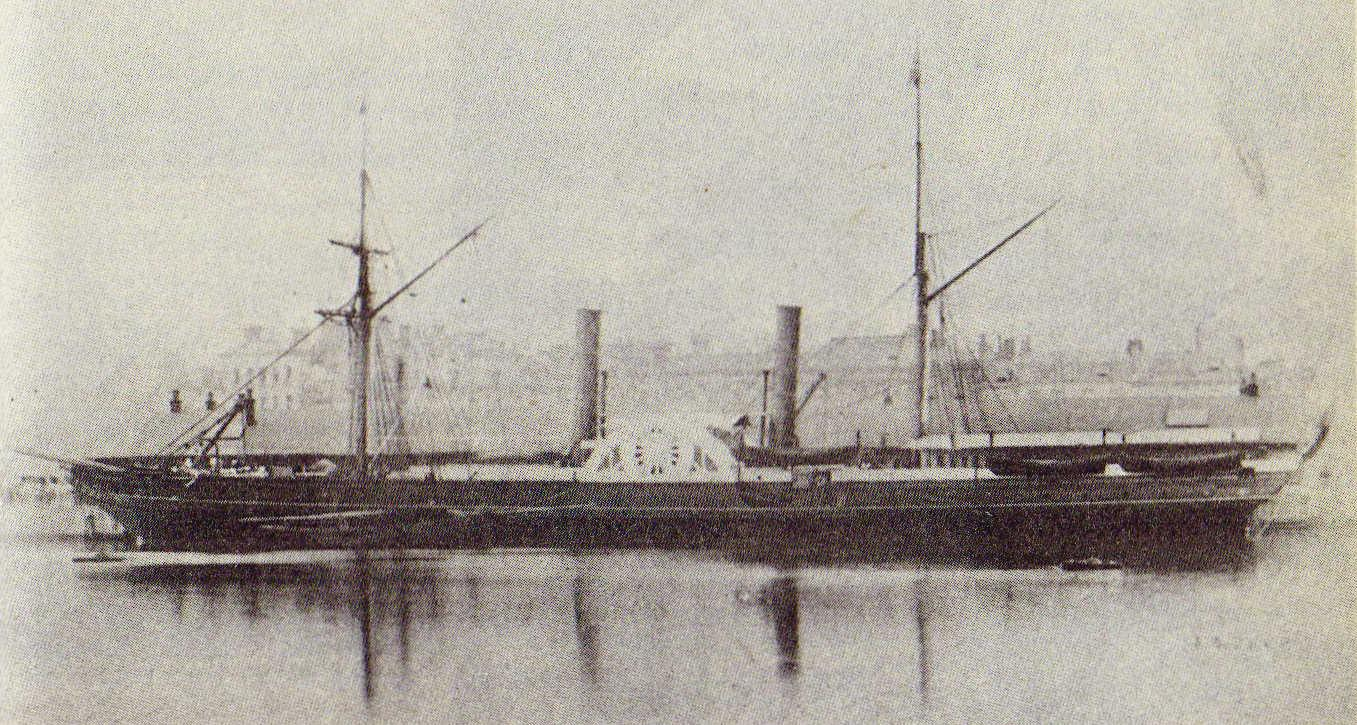
The Euxine before she was converted to a sailing ship in 1868

On 9 August 1874, the collier Euxine was lost, and its second mate James Archer took charge of one of the lifeboats with seven other survivors. Archer and four survivors were picked up on 31 August, and he was candid that he and August Muller had killed and butchered Francis Shufus, by all drawing lots. They were ultimately landed at Batavia Road, where the acting British consul William J. Fraser took their surprisingly honest depositions.

The men were then shipped to Singapore, with Fraser's depositions, to shipping master Henry Ellis, a character fictionalised in Joseph Conrad's novella The Shadow-Line. Ellis consulted Attorney General of Singapore Thomas Braddell but then wrote to the Board of Trade in London that no further action was necessary and the men were free to find another ship to serve. Singapore Governor Sir Andrew Clarke had ordered the men arrested and when he informed the Colonial Office, they insisted that he hold a judicial enquiry. The prosecution was started in Singapore but ultimately dropped after extended procedural wrangles as to whether Singapore or England was the most appropriate jurisdiction.

=== Law commission ===
The Criminal Law commissioners, who were attempting to define an English Criminal Code, considered the matter several times:

- 1839, Fourth report, Digest of Law (Art.39) included necessity as a defence to homicide;
- 1843, Seventh report (Art.29) also included the defence;
- 1846, Second report favoured leaving questions of necessity to the royal prerogative of clemency (draft Art. 19);
- 1878–1879 also declined to codify as it was "better to leave such questions to be dealt with when, if ever, they arise in practice by applying the principles of law to the circumstance of the particular case."

In 1874, James Fitzjames Stephen introduced a Homicide Law Amendment Bill that included a defence of necessity. The bill was lost and Stephen had changed his mind by 1884.

== Trial ==
The trial opened in Exeter on 3 November before Baron Huddleston. Arthur Charles QC led for the prosecution and Arthur J. H. Collins QC for the defence, paid for out of a defence fund that had been established by public subscription. Huddleston was well aware of the passion of the local jury, probably aware of the failed prosecution in Archer. Sir William Robert Grove had initially been listed to take the assizes that session, prompting speculation that Huddleston was substituted to ensure a "safe pair of hands", with his by-reputation opinionative direction of trials.

The jury was empanelled and sworn, being composed of almost the same jurors as had sat with the judge the previous day in a murder case that had resulted in the death penalty. Dudley and Stephens pleaded not guilty; Charles opened for the prosecution, outlining the legal arguments and dismissing the defence of necessity. He also dismissed the insanity defence; it was clear from the depositions and Dudley's prayer that they were aware of the gravity of their actions. Charles did not suppress the dreadful conditions on the boat and suggested an ultimate appeal to (royal) clemency.

Words followed between the judge and Collins which showed the former had made up his mind on the law and was not interested in hearing any submissions from the defence. Huddleston had already planned how he would ensure a guilty verdict and settle the law on necessity once and for all. He would invite, in robust terms, the jury to return a special verdict, stating only the facts of the case as they found them but giving no opinion on guilt or otherwise. It would then be for the judge to decide whether the facts found amounted to guilt. Though special verdicts had once been common, none had been returned since 1785 and the jury in any case retained the right to return a general verdict.

Huddleston was further determined that the legal question would be settled by a reserved bench for authority. Hence, he planned to adjourn the trial after the special verdict and reconvene with fellow judges to pronounce guilt. Collins would have his opportunity to argue the law in front of the expanded bench.

Charles produced the various accounts and depositions written by the defendants and the evidence that Mignonette was registered in Britain for jurisdiction under s.267 of the Merchant Shipping Act 1854. He then called for evidence from the various people who had spoken to the defendants on their arrival in Falmouth before calling Brooks. Brooks provided a compelling account of Dudley and Stephens' actions and his distancing. In cross-examination, Collins did not challenge his account but made him confirm the appalling conditions on the boat, Brooks' own cannibalism, their inevitable death without recourse to Parker's body and the belief that Parker would have died first.

Collins addressed the jury on necessity in his closing speech. The judge gave them a binary decision: accept his direction to find the men guilty of murder or return a special verdict. Without waiting for a decision, the judge produced a special verdict he had written the night before and invited the jury to indicate their assent to each paragraph as he read it out. It read that the men probably would have died within four days otherwise, and that Parker probably would have died before the men, and that at the time of the killing, there was every probability that all four would have died unless one of them was killed and eaten. Silence was sufficient. Though the jury finally tried to add some facts to the verdict, the judge insisted, perhaps not entirely truthfully, that their observations were already incorporated. The final words of the verdict were, "But whether upon the whole matter, the prisoners were and are guilty of murder the jury are ignorant and refer to the Court." The judge then renewed the defendants' bail and adjourned the assizes to his rooms in the Royal Courts of Justice in London for 25 November.

== Panel and Huddleston's errors ==
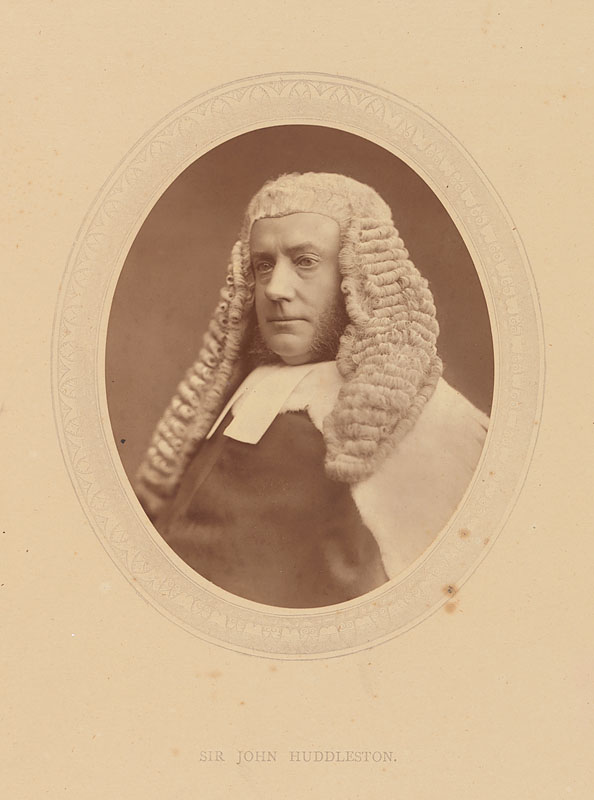
Baron Huddleston

At some point after the trial, but before the special verdict was copied for the London Review, Huddleston realised that he had made a potentially serious error. In his original draft, he had described Mignonette as an "English Merchant vessel" but had altered this to read "yacht". Further, he had described the lifeboat as "an open boat" and not asserted its provenance on Mignonette. He then realised that he had omitted the critical finding necessary to give the court jurisdiction over Dudley and Stephens. Huddleston's solution was simply to alter his record of the verdict.

On 25 November, the circuit sitting (assize) reconvened at No. 2 Court, the Royal Courts of Justice in London. Attorney General, James, appeared for the prosecution and immediately pointed out a problem. The Divisional Court of the Queen's Bench had an established authority to decide a matter of law with a panel of judges after referral from an inferior court, only by statute, after a conviction, and there had been none. James suggested that an alternative was to hear the case at the Cornwall and Devon assizes, albeit at an unusual venue, but to add further judges to the bench as all High Court judges had the authority to hear assize cases. Huddleston expressed his scepticism that judges could be added to a trial once it had begun. Moreover, he had been looking for affirmation from a superior court. By this time Collins had become suspicious of Huddleston's tampering with the trial record and requested the shorthand notes of the hearing. With the proceedings in shambles, the case was listed for 4 December, and the defendants were ordered to attend in London, though on what authority is unclear.

At a further hearing on 2 December, James withdrew his suggestion of an augmented assize court and opined that the court should sit as the Queen's Bench Divisional Court; this should only have allowed two or three judges, not the five who eventually sat. Collins seems not to have taken the opportunity to challenge the jurisdiction or constitution of the court, possibly because of some agreement with the prosecution and promise of clemency.

== Judgment ==
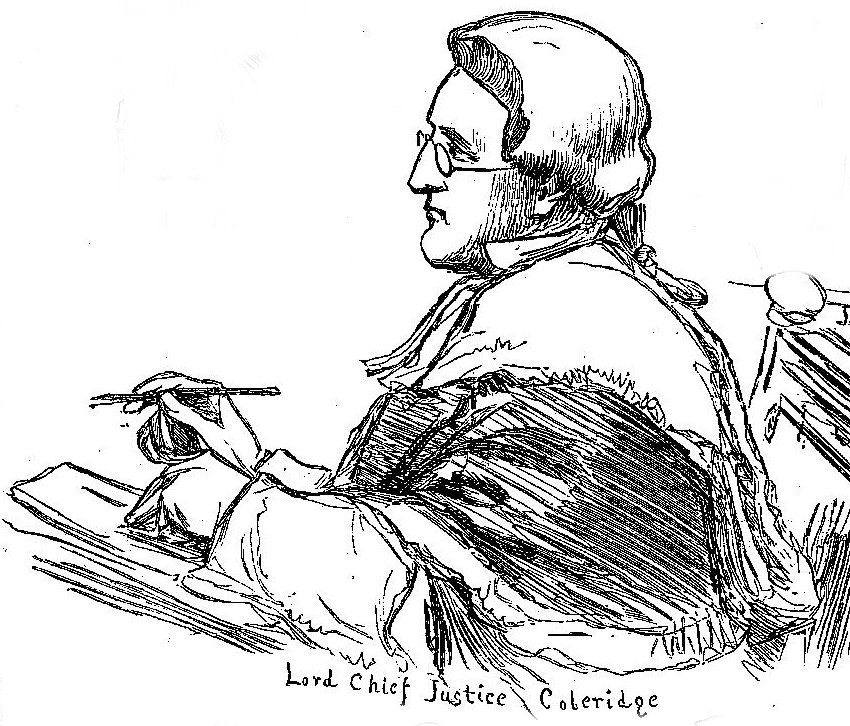
Lord Coleridge

The Queen's Bench Division sat on 4 December under Lord Chief Justice Lord Coleridge. James appeared for the prosecution, leading Charles and Danckwerts. At the beginning of the hearing, the report of the Exeter trial was read out, at some length, in its entirety. This allowed Collins to submit that the special verdict had been altered. As much was ultimately admitted and it was eventually agreed that it was best that the special verdict be restored to the version agreed by the jury. The resultant attempt to challenge the jurisdiction was rejected by the judges.

Collins submitted the court was not competent to return a verdict as the Exeter jury had not given a conditional verdict, openly stating that the jury would find in accordance with the court's ruling on the law. This troubled the judges, especially Grove, but was dismissed as one of form – judges alone overturn verdicts on the basis of law. James submitted that there was no common law authority to support the proposition that necessity was a defence to murder. The Saint Christopher case was rejected as a precedent because it had not been formally recorded in the law reports.

Before Collins started his submissions, Lord Coleridge instructed him to confine his remarks to murder, dismissing the idea of necessity as a partial defence leading to a conviction for manslaughter by analogy with the partial defence of provocation. Collins responded by citing United States v. Holmes (1842) and discussing the various theoretical and ethical arguments in favour of a necessity defence.

At the end of his submissions, the judges withdrew. They returned after a few moments and Lord Coleridge declared, "We are all of the opinion that the conviction should be affirmed but we will put our reasons in writing and give them on Saturday next." After some technical legal discussion, Lord Coleridge committed Dudley and Stephens to Holloway Prison, until Tuesday, 9 December, when the court would deliver its reasons and its sentence.

The panel found that there was no defence of necessity to a charge of murder:

- on the basis of legal precedent; nor
- on the basis of ethics and morality.

To preserve one's life is generally speaking a duty, but it may be the plainest and the highest duty to sacrifice it. War is full of instances in which it is a man's duty not to live, but to die. The duty, in case of shipwreck, of a captain to his crew, of the crew to the passengers, of soldiers to women and children, as in the noble case of the Birkenhead; these duties impose on men the moral necessity, not of the preservation, but of the sacrifice of their lives for others, from which in no country, least of all, it is to be hoped, in England, will men ever shrink, as indeed, they have not shrunk. ... It would be a very easy and cheap display of commonplace learning to quote from Greek and Latin authors, from Horace, from Juvenal, from Cicero, from Euripides, passage after passage, in which the duty of dying for others has been laid down in glowing and emphatic language as resulting from the principles of heathen ethics; it is enough in a Christian country to remind ourselves of the Great Example [Jesus Christ] whom we profess to follow.

Further, the judges questioned who was qualified to make the decision of who should live and who should die, were the principle to be allowed. They further observed that such a principle might be the "legal cloak for unbridled passion and atrocious crime". They were sensible of the men's awful predicament.

It must not be supposed that in refusing to admit temptation to be an excuse for crime it is forgotten how terrible the temptation was; how awful the suffering; how hard in such trials to keep the judgment straight and the conduct pure. We are often compelled to set up standards we cannot reach ourselves, and to lay down rules which we could not ourselves satisfy. But a man has no right to declare temptation to be an excuse, though he might himself have yielded to it, nor allow compassion for the criminal to change or weaken in any manner the legal definition of the crime.

Dudley and Stephens were sentenced to the statutory death penalty with a recommendation for mercy.

== Aftermath ==
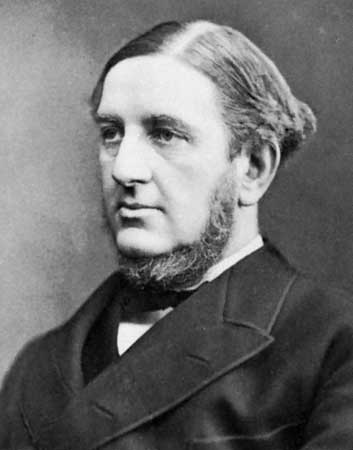
William Harcourt

Collins still had the option of moving a writ of error to raise the very arguable issues of jurisdiction and constitution of the court but he knew that the verdict in such an important case had been decided in advance and Dudley and Stephens still anticipated an immediate release. By 11 December, there was still no announcement and it seemed that, their having been convicted, public opinion was moving against the men. Any exercise of the royal prerogative of mercy would be exercised by Queen Victoria on the advice of the Home Secretary, William Harcourt.

Though Harcourt was personally in favour of the abolition of the death penalty, he was conscientious in his official duties. He took the judgment of the court seriously that the men were guilty of murder and feared that commuting the sentence to anything other than life imprisonment would mock the law. The Attorney-General felt that a life sentence would not resist the attack of public consensus. He noted that the court had withheld a finding of manslaughter from the jury, which, had it been available, would have been the jury's verdict and "no judge would have inflicted more than three months' imprisonment". The Solicitor-General concurred. Based on James's and Herschell's advice, on 12 December, Harcourt decided on six months' imprisonment. Dudley and Stephens were advised the next day but were somewhat disappointed at being held for so long in custody. Dudley never accepted the justice of his conviction. The two were released around 7:00 on 20 May 1885.

== Cultural impact ==
The case is one of a few criminal cases taught to all law students in England and Wales and in many, though not all, former British territories and has long been so. It is also a standard legal case taught to first-year American law students and is often the first criminal case read in American law schools.

After 1901, Dudley and Stephens faded in public discussion behind other, more culpable, criminals of previous decades.

The crew's ordeal inspired a key Monty Python sketch: "Lifeboat (Cannibalism) / Still no Sign of Land". Five sailors are on a lifeboat after a shipwreck. Their means to survive is cannibalism. Once they decide whom to eat — and which body parts — a waitress is called over to take their orders, complete with vegetables. In Monty Python's Flying Circus, this is followed by the controversial "Undertakers sketch", which also features cannibalism.

Yann Martel in Life of Pi (2001) named the shipwrecked Bengal tiger Richard Parker.

In 2004, American folk rock band The Avett Brothers named their album Mignonette after the involved yacht. In early 2022, the Berkeley Repertory Theatre in Berkeley, California, premiered the musical Swept Away, based on the album and involving a different, fictional shipwreck.

In 2017, Canadian author Peter Staadecker published The Twelve Man Bilbo Choir, a novel inspired in part by the Mignonette incident.

In 2022, Edgar Award–winning mystery author Elizabeth C. Bunce released the fourth volume of her Myrtle Hardcastle Mystery series, In Myrtle Peril, in which the ordeal of the crew of the fictional ship Persephone was inspired by details from the Mignonette account.

The Case of the Speluncean Explorers is a famous hypothetical case created in 1949 by legal theorist Lon L. Fuller to illustrate divergent theories of law and morality in the context of facts heavily based on those of the crew.

== Memorial ==
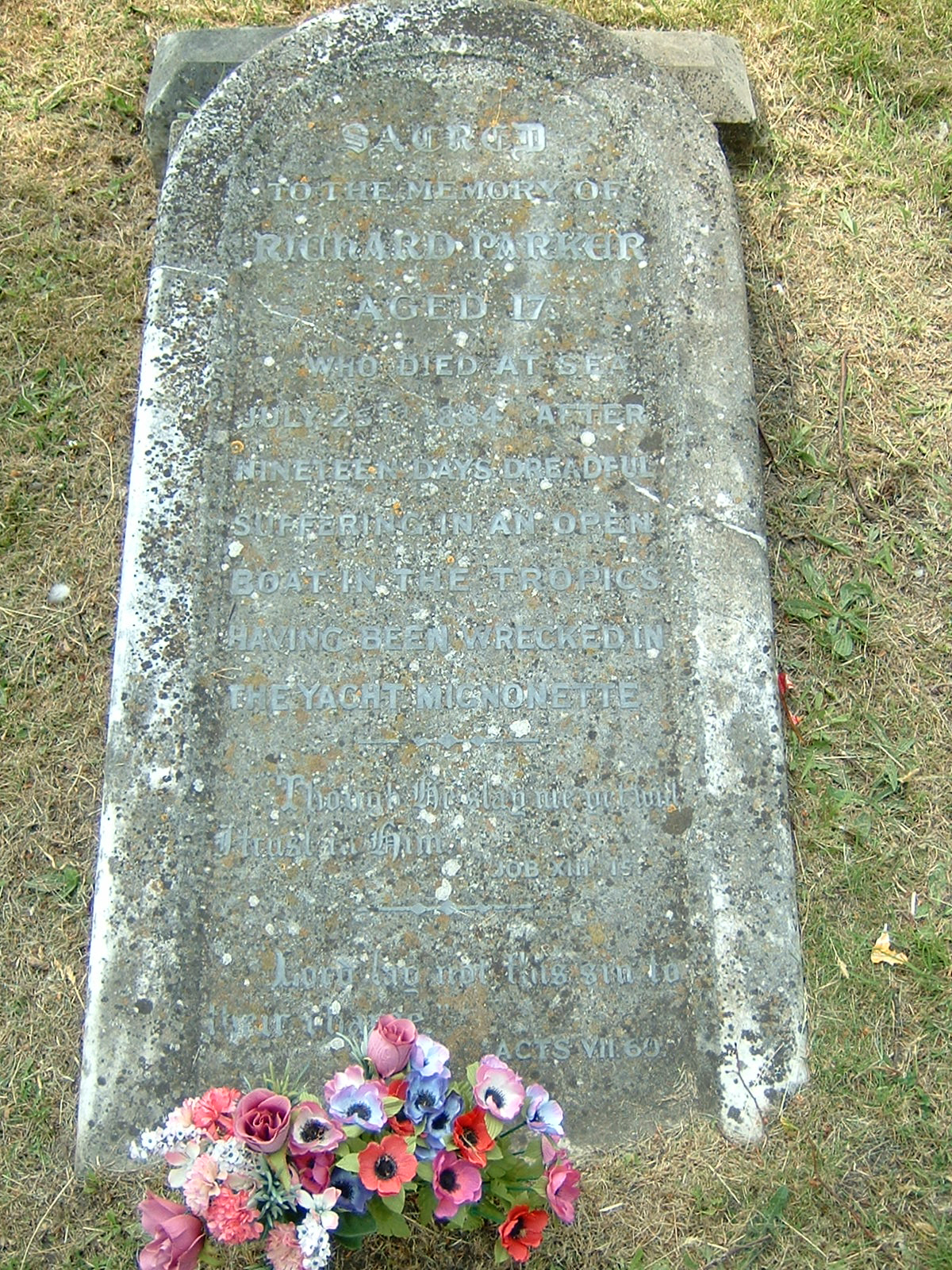
Memorial stone to Richard Parker, which does not state his manner of death. Biblical epitaphs: "Though he slay me yet will I trust in him." (Job 13:15); "Lord lay not this sin to their charge." (Acts 7:60)

A memorial stone commemorating Parker is in the churchyard of Jesus Chapel on Peartree Green in Southampton, near the site of Itchen Ferry village, from whence he came.

== See also ==
- Cospatrick (ship)
- Necessity in English criminal law
- Necessity in Canadian law

== Notes and references ==
=== References ===
- Clarke, R. F. (1885), "The 'Mignonette' case as a question of moral theology", The Month, 53: 17, hdl:2027/coo.31924065946745
- Hanson, Neil (1999), The Custom of the Sea: The Story that Changed British Law, Doubleday, ISBN 978-0-385-60083-5
- Mallin, M. G. (1967), "In warm blood: Some historical and procedural aspects of Regina v. Dudley and Stephens", University of Chicago Law Review, 34 (2): 387–407, doi:10.2307/1598938, JSTOR 1598938
- Simpson, A. W. B. (1984), Cannibalism and the Common Law: The Story of the Tragic Last Voyage of the Mignonette and the Strange Legal Proceedings to Which It Gave Rise, Chicago: University of Chicago Press, ISBN 978-0-226-75942-5
- Williams, G. (1977), "A commentary on R v. Dudley and Stephens", Cambrian Law Review, 8: 94
