= The Case of the Speluncean Explorers =

1949 legal essay by Lon L. Fuller

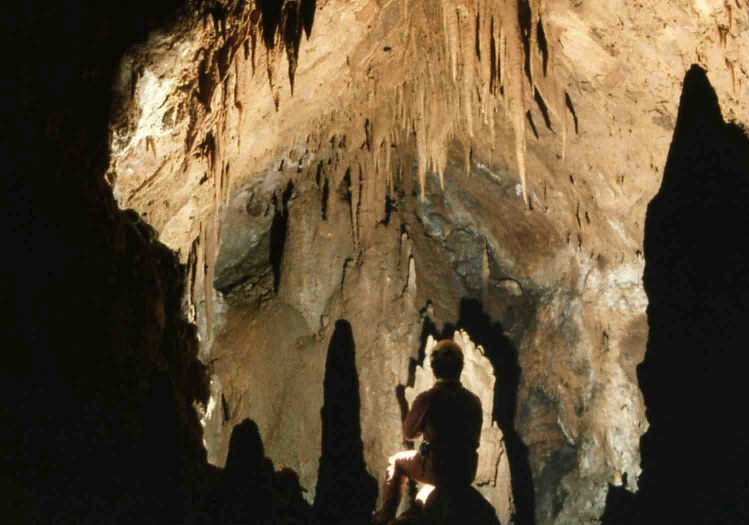
Fuller's hypothetical case involves a group of cave explorers who are trapped following a cave-in and face the risk of dying from starvation. The case examines how the rescued survivors, who kill and eat one person in order to survive, should be treated by the law.

"The Case of the Speluncean Explorers" is an article first published in the Harvard Law Review in 1949 by American legal philosopher Lon L. Fuller. Largely taking the form of a fictional judgment, it presents a legal philosophy puzzle to the reader and five possible solutions in the form of judicial opinions that are attributed to judges sitting on the fictional "Supreme Court of Newgarth" in the year 4300. (Note: Fuller addressed his decision to date his scenario in the fifth millennium in the article's postscript, writing that "the reader puzzled by the choice of date may wish to be reminded that the centuries which separate us from the year 4300 are roughly equal to those that have passed since the Age of Pericles [i.e. the fifth century BC]".)

The case involves five explorers who are caved in following a landslide. They learn via intermittent radio contact that, without food, they are likely to starve to death before they can be rescued. They decide that one of them should be killed and eaten, so that the others might survive. They determine who should be killed by throwing a pair of dice. After the four survivors are rescued, they are charged and found guilty of the murder of the fifth explorer. If their appeal to the Supreme Court of Newgarth fails, they face a mandatory death sentence. Although the wording of the statute is clear and unambiguous, there is intense public pressure to spare the men from the death penalty.

The article offers five possible court responses. Each differs in its reasoning and on whether the survivors should be found guilty of breaching the law. Two judges affirm the convictions, emphasizing the importance of the separation of powers and literal approach to statutory interpretation. Two others vote to overturn the convictions: one invokes "common sense" and the will of the people, while the other relies on arguments from the natural law tradition, such as impossibilium nulla obligatio est ("there is no obligation to do the impossible") and lex non cogit ad impossibilia ("the law does not compel the doing of impossibilities"), stressing a purposive approach to the application of law. A fifth judge, who is unable to reach a conclusion, recuses himself. As the court's decision is a tie, the original convictions are upheld and the men are sentenced to death.

Fuller's account has been described as "a classic in jurisprudence" and "a microcosm of [the 20th] century's debates" in legal philosophy. It allows for contrasts to be drawn between different legal philosophies, with the main two being natural law and legal positivism. In the 50 years following the article's publication, a further 25 hypothetical judgments were written by various authors whose perspectives include natural law theory, consequentialism, plain meaning positivism or textualism, purposivism, historical contextualism, realism, pragmatism, critical legal studies, feminism, process theory and minimalism.

== Synopsis ==
=== Facts ===
The facts of the case are recounted in the first judicial opinion, which is given by Chief Justice Truepenny.

Five cave explorers became trapped inside a cave following a landslide. They have limited food supplies and no other sources of nutrition inside the cave. Above ground, substantial resources are spent to rescue them, with 10 workmen killed in subsequent landslides near the blocked entrance. Radio contact is eventually established with the cavers on the 20th day of the cave-in, and the cavers learn that at least ten days would be required in order to free them. They then consult with medical experts, who inform them that they are unlikely to survive to the rescue given the likelihood of starvation.

One of the cavers, Roger Whetmore, then asks on the cavers' behalf if the cavers could survive ten days longer "if they consumed the flesh of one of their number". The medical experts reluctantly confirm this to be the case. Whetmore then asks if they should draw lots to select a person to be killed and eaten. No one outside the cave is willing to answer this question. Radio contact is subsequently lost.

Once the cave-in is cleared, it is discovered that only four cavers have survived; Roger Whetmore had been killed and eaten by the others. The survivors state that Whetmore had first proposed cannibalism and choosing the victim through random chance, offering a pair of dice in his possession.

Before the dice were cast, however, Whetmore declared his withdrawal from the arrangement, preferring to wait another week "before embracing an expedient so frightful and odious". The others refused to accept his change of mind, and cast the dice on his behalf. The survivors claim that Whetmore conceded that the dice were thrown fairly. He was subsequently killed and eaten.

Following their rescue and recovery, the survivors are charged with the murder of Whetmore. The relevant statute provides that "Whoever shall willfully take the life of another shall be punished by death", offering no exceptions which would be relevant to the case. The jury seek a special verdict, so that they can make limited findings of fact without having to return a verdict on whether it constitutes murder. The cavers are ultimately convicted of murder.

The mandatory sentence for murder in Newgarth is death by hanging. Both the trial judge and members of the jury petition the Chief Executive to commute the sentence of the surviving spelunkers from the death penalty to six months' imprisonment. The Chief Executive refuses to act while the Supreme Court of Newgarth considers the appeal.

Summary of Fuller's five judicial opinions
Judge	Key points	Decision
Chief Justice Truepenny	Statute is unambiguous and must be applied by judiciary notwithstanding personal views; Clemency is a matter for the executive, not the judiciary; Court should joint petition to Chief Executive for clemency	Affirms convictions but recommends clemency
Justice Foster	Defendants were in a "state of nature" so Newgarth's normal laws did not apply to them; the laws of nature would allow them to agree to sacrifice one's life to save the other four; If the laws of Newgarth do apply, then a purposive approach must be taken to the statute. Judges can find an exception to the law by implication, as the courts had earlier done with self-defense.; Principal purpose of the criminal law – deterrence – would not be served by convicting the defendants.	Sets aside convictions
Justice Tatting	Criticises Justice Foster's approach; The natural law under the posited "state of nature" prioritises freedom of contract above the right to life, which Tatting argues is absurd.; Purposive approach to statutory interpretation is difficult when there are multiple purposes (here, retribution and rehabilitation); Cannot decide case due to competing legal rationales and emotions	Withdraws from case and makes no decision
Justice Keen	Criticises Chief Justice's proposed appeal to Chief Executive for clemency given need to respect separation of powers; should only make appeal in capacity as private citizens; Moral considerations are irrelevant in applying the statute	Affirms convictions
Justice Handy	Court should take account of public opinion and "common sense"; Aware that 90% of the public want the men to face a lesser punishment or be released; Has heard rumours that the Chief Executive will not commute the sentence despite strong public opinion	Sets aside convictions

=== Opinion of Chief Justice Truepenny ===
The first opinion is largely expository; it is used to recount the facts of the case. The Chief Justice states that the statute is unambiguous, with no applicable legal defences, so it must be applied by the court. He adds that granting mercy is a decision for the executive branch of government to make, rather than the judiciary. However, the Chief Justice suggests that the judges of the court should add their names to the petition of the trial judge and jury requesting the Chief Executive to show mercy to the defendants. This would allow justice to be achieved "without impairing either the letter or spirit of our statutes and without offering any encouragement for the disregard of law".

=== Opinion of Justice Foster ===
I believe something more is on trial in this case than the fate of these unfortunate explorers; that is the law of our Commonwealth. If this Court declares that under our law these men have committed a crime, then our law is itself convicted in the tribunal of common sense, no matter what happens to the individuals involved in this petition of error. For us to assert that the law we uphold and expound compels us to a conclusion we are ashamed of, and from which we can only escape by appealing to a dispensation resting within the personal whim of the Executive, seems to me to amount to an admission that the law of this Commonwealth no longer pretends to incorporate justice.

— Justice Foster

The second opinion takes a different approach to the Chief Justice's. In determining that the convictions should be overturned, Justice Foster makes two main points. Firstly, the defendants were in a "state of nature" at the time of the killing, so the laws of nature applied to them. The laws of nature allowed to agree to sacrifice one person for the survival of the rest. Secondly, assuming the laws of Newgarth did apply, the purpose of the statute should be considered when applying it to the facts of the case. Justice Foster considers the main purpose to be deterrence, concluding that just as a conviction involving self-defense would not serve the statute's purpose, neither would a conviction in the present case.

The judge counters potential judicial activism concerns by noting that while judges must obey the will of legislators, they must do so intelligently. He draws analogies to servants who need to "read between the lines" of their masters' instructions: strict literal compliance may not always be the actual intention. Thus the "correction of obvious legislative errors or oversights is not to supplant the legislative will, but to make that will effective."

=== Opinion of Justice Tatting ===
In the third opinion, Justice Tatting is emotionally "torn between sympathy for [the defendants] and a feeling of abhorrence and disgust at the monstrous act they committed". He ultimately finds himself unable to decide the case.

Justice Tatting disagrees strongly with Justice Foster's rationales in overturning the convictions. He criticizes the "state of nature" concept and is not satisfied with Justice Foster's formulation placing the law of contract above the law against murder. He also notes the difficulty of applying the purposive approach to the criminal statute which has multiple purposes, including retribution and rehabilitation. He distinguishes the self-defence exception that was created by past judges on the basis that it is not a "willful" killing, so it does not contradict the wording of the statute. He finds that the self-defence exception could not be applied to the present case as it would raise "a quagmire of hidden difficulties".

The judge cites the case of Commonwealth v Valjean, (Note: This reference invokes Jean Valjean, the protagonist in Victor Hugo's 1862 novel Les Misérables. In the novel, Valjean is imprisoned after stealing bread to feed his sister's starving children.) in which starvation was held not to justify the theft of a loaf of bread, let alone homicide. These combined objections lead Justice Tatting to reject Justice Foster's reasoning as "intellectually unsound and approaching mere rationalization."

Despite rejecting Justice Foster's reasoning, Justice Tatting cannot bring himself to reach the alternative view, that the defendants' convictions should be upheld. He states that "almost every consideration that bears on the decision of the case is counterbalanced by an opposing consideration leading in the opposite direction." Concluding with a criticism of the prosecutor for deciding to bring the prosecution in the first place, the judge makes the "unprecedented" decision of withdrawing from the case.

=== Opinion of Justice Keen ===
The fourth opinion begins by excluding executive clemency and the morality of the defendants' actions as relevant factors to the court's deliberations. Rather, the question before the court is purely one of applying the legislation of Newgarth and determining whether the defendants wilfully took the life of Whetmore. He criticizes the other judges for failing to distinguish the legal from the moral aspects of the case. While he shares their preference that the defendants be spared from death, he respects the obligations of his office to put his "personal predilections" of what constitutes justice out of mind when interpreting and applying the law.

Justice Keen objects vehemently to Justice Foster's purposive approach allowing the plain words of the law to be ignored. He emphasizes that laws may have many possible purposes, with difficulties arising in divining the actual "purpose" of a piece of legislation.

Justice Keen recalls that earlier instances of judicial activism in Newgarth had ultimately led to civil war, which established the supremacy of the legislature over the judiciary. He concludes by criticizing the courts' creation of the self-defense excuse, stating that waiting for the legislature to enact such revisions would have led to a stronger legal system.

=== Opinion of Justice Handy ===
In contrast to the other judges, Justice Handy prefers to use a "pragmatic, common-sense approach", rather than abstract legal theories, to resolve the case. He criticizes his colleagues' "obscuring curtain of legalisms" when the case simply requires the application of "practical wisdom" of "human realities". He emphasizes the need for the courts to maintain public confidence, which requires them to follow the 90% majority in favour of applying a token punishment or releasing the defendants altogether. He is prepared to use Justice Foster's purposive approach doctrine as the legal rationale.

Justice Handy notes that apart from the ambivalent Justice Tatting, the other judges share the majority public opinion. The judges voting to uphold the convictions simply differ from Justices Foster and Handy on whose role it is to spare the defendants from the death penalty.

== Similar real cases ==
- R v Dudley and Stephens, an actual English criminal case from 1884 involving cannibalism at sea. Dudley and Stephens were sentenced to death by the court, which was later commuted to 6 months
- The William Brown was a ship whose sinking led to several passengers being forced out of an overcrowded lifeboat to save the remaining passengers. It led to the case of United States v. Holmes, in which crewman Alexander Holmes was charged with murder and convicted of manslaughter for his actions, and jailed for six months.

== See also ==
- Plank of Carneades
