= The Survivors (Godwin novel) =

1958 novel by Tom Godwin

- Dust-jacket from the first edition
- Author: Tom Godwin
- Cover artist: Wallace Wood
- Language: English
- Genre: Science fiction
- Publisher: Gnome Press
- Publication date: 1958
- Publication place: United States
- Media type: Print (hardback)
- Pages: 190
- OCLC: 1147635
- Followed by: The Space Barbarians

The Survivors is a science fiction novel by American writer Tom Godwin. It was published in 1958 by Gnome Press in an edition of 5,000 copies, of which 1,084 were never bound. The novel was published in paperback by Pyramid Books in 1960 under the title Space Prison. The novel is an expansion of Godwin's story "Too Soon to Die" which first appeared in the magazine Venture.

Godwin wrote a sequel, entitled The Space Barbarians and published in 1964.

== Plot summary ==
A ship heading from Earth to Athena, a planet 500 light years away, is suddenly attacked by the Gerns, an alien empire in its expansion phase. People aboard are divided by the invaders into Acceptables and Rejects. The Acceptables would become slave labor for the Gerns on Athena, and the Rejects are forced ashore on the nearest 'Earth-like' planet, called Ragnarok. The Gerns say they will return for the Rejects, but the Rejects quickly realise that that isn't going to happen.

Ragnarok has a gravity 1.5 times that of Earth, and is populated by deadly, aggressive creatures and it contains little in the way of usable metal ores. This, combined with a terrible deadly fever that kills in hours, more than decimates the population.

The novels follows the stranded humans through several generations as they try to survive there, and their unswerving goal to repay the Gerns for their cruelty.

== Reception ==
Floyd C. Gale wrote that he "read this yarn with the same glow of pride in the indestructibility of the human race that I once received from van Vogt's early The Alien".

Comic book writer Warren Ellis counts the novel as one of his early favorites, writing, "I must have read that book twenty times. It just rips along (in many senses of the word “rips”), as shamelessly gleeful as a short genre book should be."

Retired antiquarian bookseller D. C. Tappin relates, "Countless times in my early bookselling career young men from the nearby naval base would enter our shop and ask me to find this book that they recalled from their boyhood, though often could not recall the title or author (but could recount the plot with high accuracy)."

== Sources ==
- Chalker, Jack L.; Mark Owings (1998). The Science-Fantasy Publishers: A Bibliographic History, 1923-1998. Westminster, MD and Baltimore: Mirage Press, Ltd. p. 307.
- Tuck, Donald H. (1974). The Encyclopedia of Science Fiction and Fantasy. Chicago: Advent. p. 188. ISBN 0-911682-20-1.
