= William Brown (ship) =

American ship that sank in 1841

History
- Name: William Brown
- Fate: Sank on 19 April 1841

General characteristics
- Complement: 17 crew, 65 passengers

William Brown was an American ship that sank in 1841, taking with her 31 passengers. The survivors used two boats, which later separated to increase their chances of being found. Nine crewmen and 32 passengers occupied the overloaded longboat. At the instigation of the first mate, who was placed in charge by the captain, some of the crew, Alexander Holmes among them, forced 12 of the adult male passengers out of the boat. In the case of United States v. Holmes, Holmes–the only crewman who could be found–was charged with murder and convicted of manslaughter for his actions.

The case has continued to be used in academic contexts to teach students and also spark debate in legal scholarship regarding the nature of "necessity" as a legal defense.

== Sinking and rescue ==
Under the command of Captain George Harris, the ship departed from Liverpool on March 18, 1841, for Philadelphia with 17 seamen and 65 passengers, mostly poor Scottish and Irish emigrants. At about 10 p.m. on the night of April 19, William Brown struck an iceberg 250 miles (400 km) southeast of Cape Race, Newfoundland, and sank. The captain, eight seamen, and one passenger made it to the jolly boat (to be picked up six days later by a French fishing vessel), while nine crewmen and 32 passengers occupied the longboat. Holmes returned to the sinking ship "at great peril of his life" to rescue the sick daughter of a widowed Scotswoman. One person had died earlier on the voyage, and 31 passengers, many of them children, went down with the ship.

Before the two boats parted ways to increase their chances of being found, Captain Harris placed the first mate, Francis Rhodes, in charge of the crowded, leaking longboat. At about 10 p.m., 24 hours after the sinking, the wind picked up, sending water over the longboat's gunwales, and it began to rain heavily. The first mate shouted, "This ... won't do. Help me, God. Men, go to work." When the crewmen did nothing, he stated, "Men, you must go to work, or we shall all perish." Then, the seamen, among them Alexander Holmes, forced 12 men out of the boat. Two women also went into the frigid water, though they may have voluntarily followed their brother, Frank Askin. Early the next morning, two men were found to be hiding and were also jettisoned. All of the male passengers, except for two married men and a young boy, had been sacrificed, while all of the crewmen remained aboard. Later that day, the survivors were picked up by the American ship Crescent and taken to Le Havre, Seine-Maritime, France.

== Trial ==
Some of the surviving passengers, after finally reaching their destination of Philadelphia on May 10, filed a complaint against the crew with the District Attorney. Holmes was the only crewman to be found in the city, so he was the only one charged. He was accused of murdering Frank Askin. A grand jury before Supreme Court Justice Henry Baldwin refused to indict him on that charge, so it was reduced to manslaughter. In the 1842 case of United States v. Holmes, Baldwin, who presided over the case as circuit justice, instructed the jury about the legal relationship between the crew members of a ship and the passengers, pointing out that it is the sailor who is expected to be responsible for the safety of his or her ship and face the dangers associated with sea voyages, which cannot change during a disaster during which a seaman is expected to maintain his duty and protect the passengers.

The defendant was found guilty and sentenced to six months in jail and a $20 fine ($650 today). None of the other crewmen were ever brought to trial.

== Films ==
The 1937 film Souls at Sea, with Gary Cooper, George Raft, and Henry Wilcoxon, is somewhat based on the disaster, changing the cause of it to a fire accidentally set by a little girl. A story involving abolitionists against the slave trade is involved, but the conclusion has Cooper's character forced to jettison passengers out of the overcrowded lifeboat, and facing a trial for murder as a result.

The 1957 film Seven Waves Away (renamed Abandon Ship! in the United States), was also loosely based on the incident, with Tyrone Power starring as "Alec Holmes".

A 1975 made-for-television version, The Last Survivors, featured Martin Sheen.

== See also ==
- R v Dudley and Stephens, a British criminal case that cited United States v. Holmes
- The Case of the Speluncean Explorers, a theoretical case with many similarities.
