= Tom Godwin =

American novelist

- Born: June 6, 1915; Maryland, US
- Died: August 31, 1980 (aged 65)
- Writing career
- Genre: science fiction
- Notable work: "The Cold Equations"

Tom Godwin (June 6, 1915 – August 31, 1980) was an American science fiction author active throughout the 1950s into the 1970s. In his career, Godwin published three novels and around thirty short stories. He is best known for his short story, "The Cold Equations". Published in 1954, the short story was Godwin's fourth work to be published and was one whose controversial dark ending helped redefine the genre.

== Early life and education ==
Godwin was born in Maryland in 1915. He had a rough childhood that was marked by much loss and suffering. At the age of five, his younger sister died as a result of an accidental shooting that occurred after he had been "playing with the gun that killed her". After his mother's death, he was raised by his father, with whom he did not have the best relationship. He withdrew from school after the third grade, but he went on to teach himself multiple other subjects to expand his knowledge and be able to write better stories.

== Personal life ==
Godwin had a spinal disorder known as kyphosis, which results in a curvature of the spine, making him appear hunchbacked. He spent a few months in the Army before he was discharged due to his spinal condition worsening.

In the early 1960s, Godwin was living in a remote area of northwestern Arizona with his father while writing and making his own drywashers to sell. It was in the summer of 1961 that he met his future wife, Laureola Godwin, and his then twelve-year-old step-daughter, whom he later adopted, Diane Godwin Sullivan, through the sale of one of his drywashers. He went on to base two of the main characters in his second novel, The Space Barbarians, after them.

He worked for the forest service in Washington state for a short period of time. His wife died from a heart attack in the early 1970s. This was something that had a heavy impact on him for the rest of his life. After living with his adopted daughter and her family in Texas for some time after his wife's death, he moved to Nevada.

== Death ==
Throughout his life, Godwin battled with alcohol abuse with varying degrees of success in being able to control it. It was his wife's death that eventually led him to be "consume[d]" by drinking which led to many health problems. Godwin died in a Las Vegas hospital in the summer of 1980. He did not have any identification on him so his body was held at a funeral home until a friend of his who was a physician assistant learned of his death and contacted his daughter, Diane.

== Works ==
=== Novels ===
Ragnarok series:

- The Survivors (Gnome Press, 1958; also known as Space Prison, Pyramid Books, 1960)
- The Space Barbarians (Pyramid Books, 1964)

Others:

- Beyond Another Sun (Curtis, 1971)

=== Short stories ===
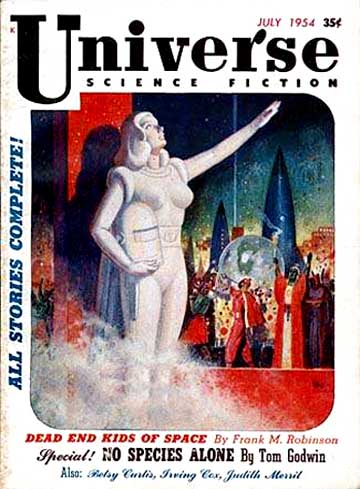
Godwin's novelette, "No Species Alone," was not published until the November issue despite being cover-featured on the July 1954 issue of Universe Science Fiction.

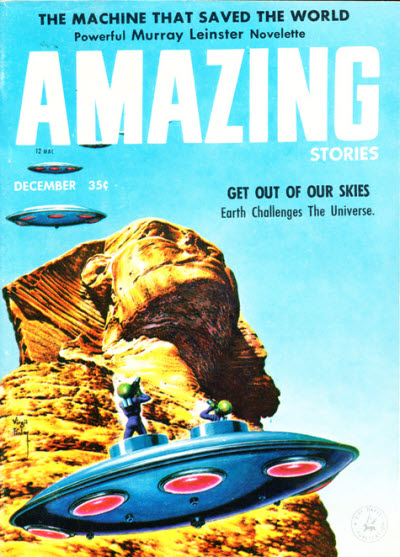
Godwin's, "The Nothing Equation," was his first short story to be published in Amazing Stories. It appeared in the magazine's December issue in 1957.

- "The Gulf Between" in Astounding, October 1953
- "Mother of Invention" in Astounding, December 1953
- "The Greater Thing" in Astounding, February 1954
- "The Cold Equations" in Astounding, August 1954
- "No Species Alone" in Universe, November 1954
- "You Created Us" in Fantastic Universe, October 1955
- "The Barbarians" in If, December 1955
- "Operation Opera" in The Magazine of Fantasy & Science Fiction, April 1956
- "Brain Teaser" in If, October 1956
- "Too Soon to Die" (basis for his novel The Survivors) in Venture, March 1957
- "The Harvest" in Venture, July 1957
- "The Last Victory" in If, August 1957
- "The Nothing Equation" in Amazing, December 1957
- "The Wild Ones" in Science Fiction Stories, January 1958
- "My Brother — The Ape" in Amazing, January 1958
- "Cry From a Far Planet" in Amazing, September 1958
- "A Place Beyond the Stars" in Super-Science Fiction, February 1959
- "Empathy" in Fantastic, October 1959
- "The Helpful Hand of God" in Analog, December 1961
- "...and Devious the Line of Duty" in Analog, December 1962
- "Desert Execution" in The Man from U.N.C.L.E. Magazine, July 1967
- "The Gentle Captive" in the anthology Signs and Wonders (ed. Roger Elwood) (1972)
- "She Was a Child" in Mike Shayne Mystery Magazine, April 1973
- "We'll Walk Again in the Moonlight" in the anthology Crisis (ed. Roger Elwood) (1974)
- "Backfire" in Ed McBain's 87th Precinct Mystery Magazine, April 1975
- "The Steel Guardian" in Antaeus, Spring/Summer 1977
- "Social Blunder" in Amazing, July 1977
- "Before Willows Ever Walked" in The Magazine of Fantasy & Science Fiction, March 1980

=== Collection ===
The following stories are collected in The Cold Equations and Other Stories edited by Eric Flint (Baen Books, 2004):

- "The Survivors (novel)
- "The Harvest" (short story)
- "Brain Teaser" (short story)
- "Mother of Invention" (novella)
- "...and Devious the Line of Duty" (novelette)
- "Empathy" (novelette)
- "No Species Alone" (novelette)
- "The Gulf Between" (novella)
- "The Cold Equations" (novelette)
