= Civil disobedience =

Nonviolent disobedience of the law

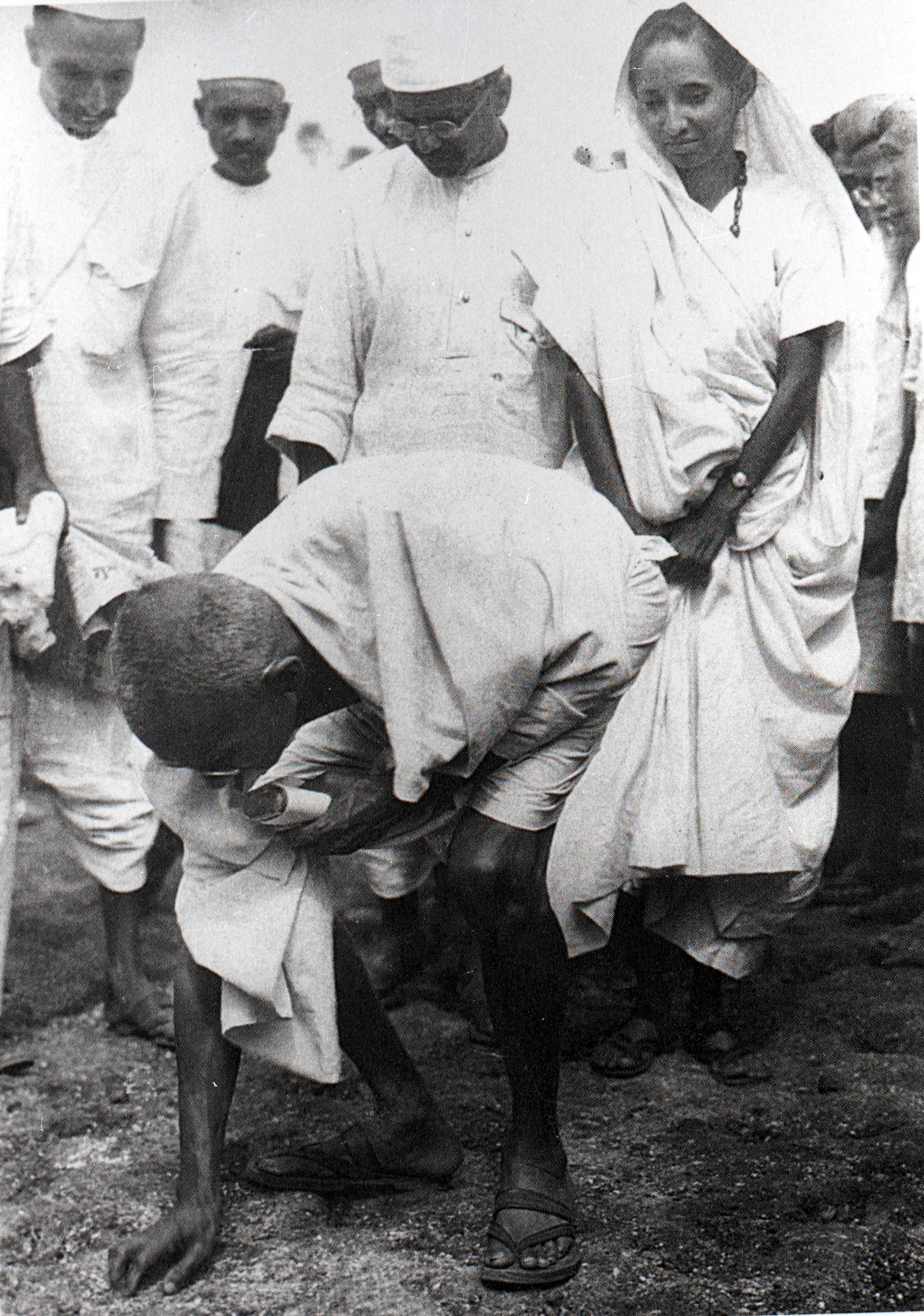
Mahatma Gandhi making salt in violation of and protest against British salt laws

Civil disobedience is the active and professed refusal of a citizen to obey certain laws, demands, orders, or commands of a government (or any other authority). By some definitions, civil disobedience has to be nonviolent to be called "civil". Hence, civil disobedience is sometimes equated with nonviolent resistance. Henry David Thoreau's essay Resistance to Civil Government, first published in 1849 and then published posthumously in 1866 as Civil Disobedience, popularized the term in the US, although the concept itself was practiced long before this work.

Various forms of civil disobedience have been used by prominent activists, such as American women's suffrage leader Susan B. Anthony in the late 19th century, Egyptian nationalist Saad Zaghloul during the 1910s, and Indian nationalist Mahatma Gandhi in 1920s British India as part of his leadership of the Indian independence movement. Martin Luther King Jr.'s and James Bevel's peaceful nonviolent protests during the civil rights movement in the 1960s United States sometimes contained important aspects of civil disobedience. Although civil disobedience is rarely justifiable in court, King regarded civil disobedience to be a display and practice of reverence for law: "Any man who breaks a law that conscience tells him is unjust and willingly accepts the penalty by staying in jail to arouse the conscience of the community on the injustice of the law is at that moment expressing the very highest respect for the law out of all other freedom struggles."

== History ==
An early depiction of civil disobedience is in Sophocles' play Antigone, in which Antigone, one of the daughters of former King of Thebes, Oedipus, defies Creon, the current King of Thebes, who is trying to stop her from giving her brother Polynices a proper burial. She gives a stirring speech in which she tells him that she must obey her conscience rather than human law. She is not at all afraid of the death he threatens her with (and eventually carries out), but she is afraid of how her conscience will smite her if she does not do this.

Conrad Grebel and Anabaptists advocated civil disobedience to oppression. Étienne de La Boétie's thought developed in his work Discours de la servitude volontaire ou le Contr'un (1552) was also taken up by many movements of civil disobedience, which drew from the concept of rebellion to voluntary servitude the foundation of its instrument of struggle. Étienne de La Boétie was one of the first to theorize and propose the strategy of non-cooperation, and thus a form of nonviolent disobedience, as an effective weapon.

In the lead-up to the Glorious Revolution in Britain—when the 1689 Bill of Rights was documented, the last Catholic monarch was deposed, and male and female joint-co-monarchs elevated—the English Midland Enlightenment developed a manner of voicing objection to a law viewed as illegitimate and then taking the consequences of the law. (For example, they might refuse to swear allegiance to the king, and, as a consequence, accept the prison sentence legally and normally meted out to people who refused to take this oath.) This was focused on the illegitimacy of laws claimed to be "divine" in origin, both the "divine rights of kings" and "divine rights of man", and the legitimacy of laws acknowledged to be made by human beings.

Following the Peterloo massacre of 1819, the poet Percy Shelley wrote the political poem The Mask of Anarchy later that year, that begins with the images of what he thought to be the unjust forms of authority of his time—and then imagines the stirrings of a new form of social action. According to Ashton Nichols, it is perhaps the first modern statement of the principle of nonviolent protest. A version was taken up by the author Henry David Thoreau in his essay Civil Disobedience, and later by Gandhi in his doctrine of Satyagraha. Gandhi's Satyagraha was partially influenced and inspired by Shelley's nonviolence in protest and political action. In particular, it is known that Gandhi often quoted Shelley's Mask of Anarchy to vast audiences during the campaign for a free India.

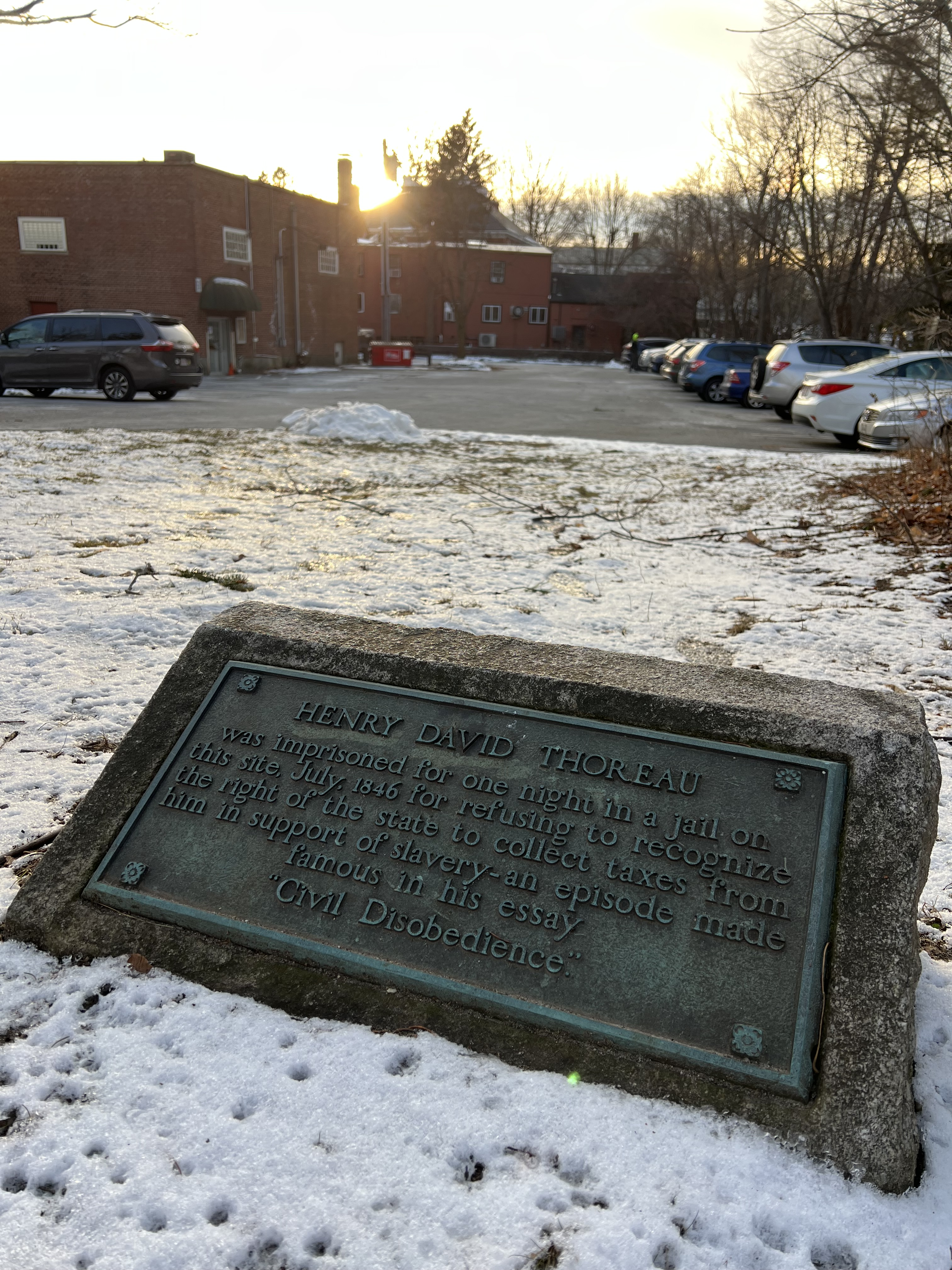
A marker at the location where Thoreau was imprisoned for one night in Concord, Massachusetts

Thoreau's 1849 essay Civil Disobedience, originally titled "Resistance to Civil Government", has had a wide influence on many later practitioners of civil disobedience. The driving idea behind the essay is that citizens are morally responsible for their support of aggressors, even when such support is required by law. In the essay, Thoreau explained his reasons for having refused to pay taxes as an act of protest against slavery and against the Mexican–American War. He writes,

If I devote myself to other pursuits and contemplations, I must first see, at least, that I do not pursue them sitting upon another man's shoulders. I must get off him first, that he may pursue his contemplations too. See what gross inconsistency is tolerated. I have heard some of my townsmen say, "I should like to have them order me out to help put down an insurrection of the slaves, or to march to Mexico;—see if I would go;" and yet these very men have each, directly by their allegiance, and so indirectly, at least, by their money, furnished a substitute.

By the 1850s, a range of minority groups in the United States: African Americans, Jews, Seventh Day Baptists, Catholics, anti-prohibitionists, racial egalitarians, and others—employed civil disobedience to combat a range of legal measures and public practices that to them promoted ethnic, religious, and racial discrimination. Pro Public and typically peaceful resistance to political power remained an integral tactic in modern American minority rights politics.

In Ireland starting from 1879 the Irish "Land War" intensified when Irish nationalist leader Charles Stewart Parnell, in a speech in Ennis proposed that when dealing with tenants who take farms where another tenant was evicted, rather than resorting to violence, everyone in the locality should shun them. Following this Captain Charles Boycott, the land agent of an absentee landlord in County Mayo, Ireland, was subject to social ostracism organized by the Irish Land League in 1880. Boycott attempted to evict eleven tenants from his land. While Parnell's speech did not refer to land agents or landlords, the tactic was applied to Boycott when the alarm was raised about the evictions. Despite the short-term economic hardship to those undertaking this action, Boycott soon found himself isolated – his workers stopped work in the fields and stables, as well as in his house. Local businessmen stopped trading with him, and the local postman refused to deliver mail. The movement spread throughout Ireland and gave rise to the term to Boycott, and eventually led to legal reform and support for Irish independence.

Egypt saw a massive implementation on a nation-wide movement starting 1914 and peaking in 1919 as the Egyptian Revolution of 1919. This was then adopted by other peoples who campaigned against European colonial rule from 1920 onwards. Zaghloul Pasha, considered the mastermind behind this massive civil disobedience, was a native middle-class, Azhar graduate, political activist, judge, parliamentary and ex-cabinet minister whose leadership brought Christian and Muslim communities together as well as women into the massive protests. Along with his companions of Wafd Party, who have achieved an independence of Egypt and a first constitution in 1923. Civil disobedience is one of the many ways people have revolted against what they deem to be unfair laws. It has been used in many nonviolent resistance movements in India (Mahatma Gandhi's campaigns for independence from the British Empire), in Czechoslovakia's Velvet Revolution, in early stages of the Bangladeshi independence movement against Pakistani colonialism and in East Germany to oust their Stalinist government. In South Africa during the leftist campaign against the far-right Apartheid regime, in the American civil rights movement against Jim Crow laws, in the Singing Revolution to bring independence to the Baltic countries from the Soviet Union, and more recently with the 2003 Rose Revolution in Georgia, the 2004 Orange Revolution and the 2013–2014 Euromaidan revolution in Ukraine, the 2016–2017 Candlelight Revolution in South Korea, and the 2020–2021 Belarusian protests, among many other various movements worldwide.

== Etymology ==
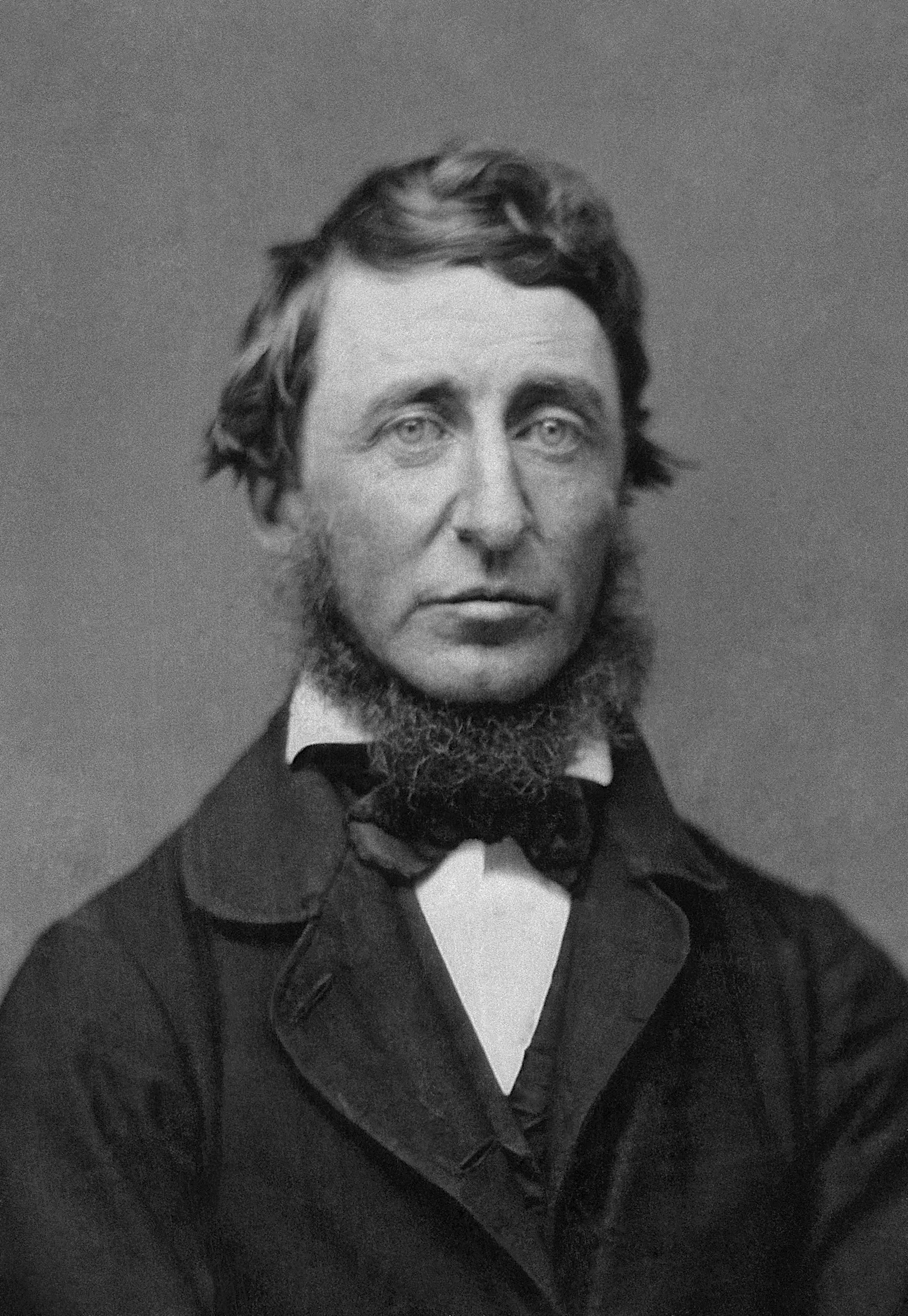
Henry David Thoreau's classic essay Civil Disobedience inspired Martin Luther King Jr. and many other activists.

Henry David Thoreau's 1849 essay "Resistance to Civil Government" was eventually renamed "Essay on Civil Disobedience". After his landmark lectures were published in 1866, the term began to appear in numerous sermons and lectures relating to slavery and the war in Mexico. Thus, by the time Thoreau's lectures were first published under the title "Civil Disobedience", in 1866, four years after his death, the term had achieved fairly widespread usage.

It has been argued that the term "civil disobedience" has always suffered from ambiguity and in modern times, become utterly debased. Marshall Cohen notes, "It has been used to describe everything from bringing a test-case in the federal courts to taking aim at a federal official. Indeed, for Vice President Spiro Agnew it has become a code-word describing the activities of muggers, arsonists, draft evaders, campaign hecklers, campus militants, anti-war demonstrators, juvenile delinquents and political assassins."

LeGrande writes that

the formulation of a single all-encompassing definition of the term is extremely difficult, if not impossible. In reviewing the voluminous literature on the subject, the student of civil disobedience rapidly finds himself surrounded by a maze of semantical problems and grammatical niceties. Like Alice in Wonderland, he often finds that specific terminology has no more (or no less) meaning than the individual orator intends it to have.

He encourages a distinction between lawful protest demonstration, nonviolent civil disobedience, and violent civil disobedience.

In a letter to P. K. Rao, dated 10 September 1935, Gandhi disputes that his idea of civil disobedience was derived from the writings of Thoreau:

The statement that I had derived my idea of Civil Disobedience from the writings of Thoreau is wrong. The resistance to authority in South Africa was well advanced before I got the essay ... When I saw the title of Thoreau's great essay, I began to use his phrase to explain our struggle to the English readers. But I found that even "Civil Disobedience" failed to convey the full meaning of the struggle. I therefore adopted the phrase "Civil Resistance."

== Theories ==
In seeking an active form of civil disobedience, one may choose to deliberately break certain laws, such as by forming a peaceful blockade or occupying a facility illegally, though sometimes violence has been known to occur. Often there is an expectation to be attacked or even beaten by the authorities. Protesters often undergo training in advance on how to react to arrest or to attack.

Civil disobedience is usually defined as pertaining to a citizen's relation to the state and its laws, as distinguished from a constitutional impasse, in which two public agencies, especially two equally sovereign branches of government, conflict. For instance, if the head of government of a country were to refuse to enforce a decision of that country's highest court, it would not be civil disobedience, since the head of government would act in his or her capacity as public official rather than private citizen.

This definition is disputed by Thoreau's political philosophy on the conscience vs. the collective. The person is the final judge of right and wrong. More than this, since only people act, only a person can act unjustly. When the government knocks on the door, it is a person in the form of a postman or tax collector whose hand hits the wood. Before Thoreau's imprisonment, when a confused taxman had wondered aloud about how to handle his refusal to pay, Thoreau had advised, "Resign". If a man chose to be an agent of injustice, then Thoreau insisted on confronting him with the fact that he was making a choice. He admits that government may express the will of the majority but it may also express nothing more than the will of elite politicians. Even a good form of government is "liable to be abused and perverted before the people can act through it". If a government did express the voice of most people, this would not compel the obedience of those who disagree with what is said. The majority may be powerful but it is not necessarily right.

In his 1971 book, A Theory of Justice, John Rawls described civil disobedience as "a public, non-violent, conscientious yet political act contrary to law usually done with the aim of bringing about change in the law or policies of the government".

Ronald Dworkin held that there are three types of civil disobedience:

- "Integrity-based" civil disobedience occurs when a citizen disobeys a law they feel is immoral, as in the case of abolitionists disobeying the fugitive slave laws by refusing to turn over escaped slaves to authorities.
- "Justice-based" civil disobedience occurs when a citizen disobeys laws to lay claim to some right denied to them, as when Black people illegally protested during the civil rights movement.
- "Policy-based" civil disobedience occurs when a person breaks the law to change a policy they believe is dangerously wrong.

Some theories of civil disobedience hold that civil disobedience is only justified against governmental entities. Brownlee argues that disobedience in opposition to the decisions of non-governmental agencies such as trade unions, banks, and private universities can be justified if it reflects "a larger challenge to the legal system that permits those decisions to be taken". The same principle, she argues, applies to breaches of law in protest against international organizations and foreign governments.

It is usually recognized that lawbreaking, if it is not done publicly, at least must be publicly announced to constitute civil disobedience. But Stephen Eilmann argues that if it is necessary to disobey rules that conflict with morality, we might ask why disobedience should take the form of public civil disobedience rather than simply covert lawbreaking. If a lawyer wishes to help a client overcome legal obstacles to securing their natural rights, he might, for instance, find that assisting in fabricating evidence or committing perjury is more effective than open disobedience. This assumes that common morality does not have a prohibition on deceit in such situations. The Fully Informed Jury Association's publication "A Primer for Prospective Jurors" notes, "Think of the dilemma faced by German citizens when Hitler's secret police demanded to know if they were hiding a Jew in their house." By this definition, civil disobedience could be traced back to the Book of Exodus, where Shiphrah and Puah refused a direct order of Pharaoh but misrepresented how they did it. (Exodus 1: 15–19)

=== Violent vs. nonviolent ===
There have been debates as to whether civil disobedience must necessarily be non-violent. Black's Law Dictionary includes nonviolence in its definition of civil disobedience. Christian Bay's encyclopedia article states that civil disobedience requires "carefully chosen and legitimate means", but holds that they do not have to be non-violent. It has been argued that, while both civil disobedience and civil rebellion are justified by appeal to constitutional defects, rebellion is much more destructive; therefore, the defects justifying rebellion must be much more serious than those justifying disobedience, and if one cannot justify civil rebellion, then one cannot justify a civil disobedient's use of force and violence and refusal to submit to arrest. Civil disobedients' refraining from violence is also said to help preserve society's tolerance of civil disobedience.

The philosopher H. J. McCloskey argues that "if violent, intimidatory, coercive disobedience is more effective, it is, other things being equal, more justified than less effective, nonviolent disobedience." In his best-selling Disobedience and Democracy: Nine Fallacies on Law and Order, Howard Zinn takes a similar position; Zinn states that while the goals of civil disobedience are generally nonviolent,

in the inevitable tension accompanying the transition from a violent world to a non-violent one, the choice of means will almost never be pure, and will involve such complexities that the simple distinction between violence and non-violence does not suffice as a guide ... the very acts with which we seek to do good cannot escape the imperfections of the world we are trying to change.

Zinn rejects any "easy and righteous dismissal of violence", noting that Thoreau, the popularizer of the term civil disobedience, approved of the armed insurrection of John Brown. He also notes that some major civil disobedience campaigns which have been classified as non-violent, such as the Birmingham campaign, have actually included elements of violence.

=== Revolutionary vs. non-revolutionary ===
Non-revolutionary civil disobedience is a simple disobedience of laws on the grounds that they are judged "wrong" by a person's conscience, or as part of an effort to render certain laws ineffective, to cause their repeal, or to exert pressure to get one's political wishes on some other issue. Revolutionary civil disobedience is more of an active attempt to overthrow a government (or to change cultural traditions, social customs or religious beliefs). Revolution does not have to be political, i.e. "cultural revolution", it simply implies sweeping and widespread change to a section of the social fabric. Gandhi's acts have been described as revolutionary civil disobedience. It has been claimed that the Hungarians under Ferenc Deák directed revolutionary civil disobedience against the Austrian government. Thoreau also wrote of civil disobedience accomplishing "peaceable revolution". Howard Zinn, Harvey Wheeler, and others have identified the right espoused in the US Declaration of Independence to "alter or abolish" an unjust government to be a principle of civil disobedience.

=== Collective vs. solitary ===
The earliest recorded incidents of collective civil disobedience took place during the Roman Empire. Unarmed Jews gathered in the streets to prevent the installation of pagan images in the Temple in Jerusalem. In modern times, some activists who commit civil disobedience as a group collectively refuse to sign bail until certain demands are met, such as favourable bail conditions, or the release of all the activists. This is a form of jail solidarity. There have also been many instances of solitary civil disobedience, such as that committed by Thoreau, but these sometimes go unnoticed. Thoreau, at the time of his arrest, was not yet a well-known author, and his arrest was not covered in any newspapers in the days, weeks and months after it happened. The tax collector who arrested him rose to higher political office, and Thoreau's essay was not published until after the end of the Mexican War.

== Choices ==
=== Action ===
Civil disobedients have chosen a variety of different illegal acts. Hugo A. Bedau writes,

There is a whole class of acts, undertaken in the name of civil disobedience, which, even if they were widely practiced, would in themselves constitute hardly more than a nuisance (e.g. trespassing at a nuclear-missile installation) ... Such acts are often just a harassment and, at least to the bystander, somewhat inane ... The remoteness of the connection between the disobedient act and the objectionable law lays such acts open to the charge of ineffectiveness and absurdity.

Bedau also notes, though, that the very harmlessness of such entirely symbolic illegal protests toward public policy goals may serve a propaganda purpose. Some civil disobedients, such as the proprietors of illegal medical cannabis dispensaries and Voice in the Wilderness, which brought medicine to Iraq without the permission of the US government, directly achieve a desired social goal (such as the provision of medication to the sick) while openly breaking the law. Julia Butterfly Hill lived in Luna, a 180-foot (55 m)-tall, 600-year-old California Redwood tree for 738 days, preventing its felling.

In cases where the criminalized behaviour is pure speech, civil disobedience can consist simply of engaging in the forbidden speech. An example is WBAI's broadcasting of the bit "Filthy Words" from a George Carlin comedy album, which eventually led to the 1978 Supreme Court case of FCC v. Pacifica Foundation. Threatening government officials is a way to express defiance toward the government and unwillingness to stand for its policies. For example, a supporter of some tax deniers in New Hampshire, Edward and Elaine Brown, was arrested for allegedly telling the local city councillors to "Wise up or die."

More generally, protesters of particular victimless crimes often see fit to openly commit that crime. Laws against public nudity, for instance, have been protested by going naked in public, and laws against cannabis consumption have been protested by openly possessing it and using it at cannabis rallies.

Some forms of civil disobedience, such as illegal boycotts, refusals to pay taxes, draft dodging, distributed denial-of-service attacks, and sit-ins, make it more difficult for a system to function. In this way, they might be considered coercive; coercive disobedience has the effect of exposing the enforcement of laws and policies, and it has even operated as an aesthetic strategy in contemporary art practice. Brownlee notes that "although civil disobedients are constrained in their use of coercion by their conscientious aim to engage in moral dialogue, nevertheless they may find it necessary to employ limited coercion to get their issue onto the table". The Plowshares organization temporarily closed GCSB Waihopai by padlocking the gates and using sickles to deflate one of the large domes covering two satellite dishes.

Electronic civil disobedience can include web site defacements, redirects, denial-of-service attacks, information theft and data leaks, illegal web site parodies, virtual sit-ins, and virtual sabotage. It is distinct from other kinds of hacktivism in that the perpetrator openly reveals his identity. Virtual actions rarely succeed in completely shutting down their targets, but they often generate media attention.

Dilemma actions are designed to create a "response dilemma" for public authorities "by forcing them to either concede some public space to protesters or make themselves look absurd or heavy-handed by acting against the protest."

=== Response to punishment ===
As civil disobedience is intentionally breaking the law, people engaging in civil disobedience can expect to be arrested, criminally charged, tried, and legally punished for breaking the law. Protestors have to make choices about how to respond to each of these results.

Al Sharpton, a civil rights and social justice activist, says that civil disobedients "must be prepared to say the cause is more important than my freedom" and not incorrectly believe themselves to have legal immunity or feel a sense of entitlement to break laws without being subject to the ordinary legal punishments for breaking those laws.

==== Arrest strategies ====
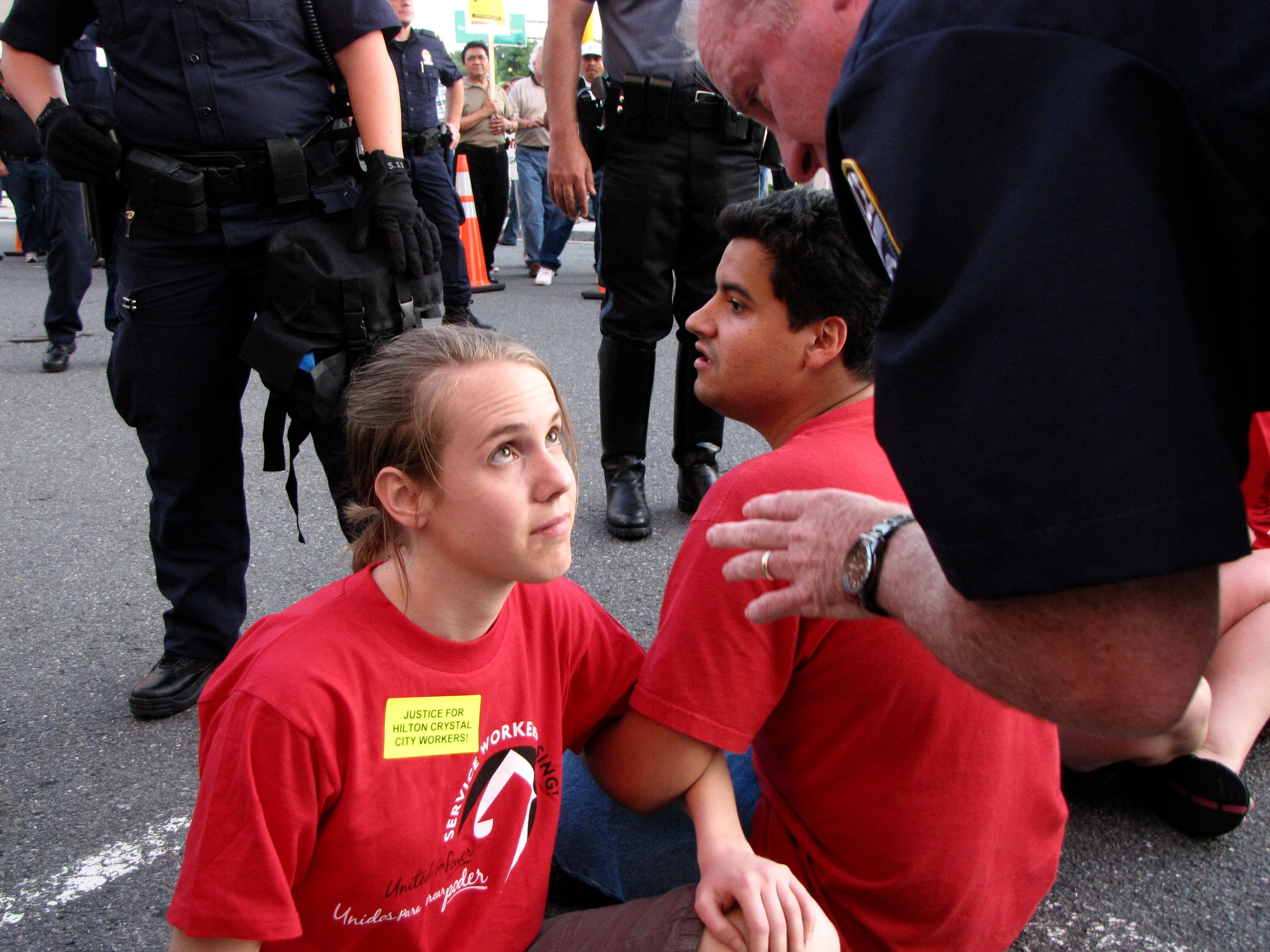
A police officer speaks with a demonstrator at a union picket, explaining that she will be arrested if she does not leave the street. The demonstrator was arrested moments later.

Some disciplines of civil disobedience hold that the protester must submit to arrest and cooperate with the authorities. Others advocate falling limp or resisting arrest, especially when it will hinder the police from effectively responding to a mass protest.

Many of the same decisions and principles that apply in other criminal investigations and arrests arise also in civil disobedience cases. For example, the suspect may need to decide whether to grant a consent search of his property and whether to talk to police officers. It is generally agreed within the legal community, and is often believed within the activist community, that a suspect's talking to criminal investigators can serve no useful purpose and may be harmful. Some civil disobedients are compelled to respond to investigators' questions, sometimes by a misunderstanding of the legal ramifications or a fear of seeming rude. Also, some civil disobedients seek to use the arrest as an opportunity to make an impression on the officers. Thoreau wrote,

My civil neighbor, the tax-gatherer, is the very man I have to deal with—for it is, after all, with men and not with parchment that I quarrel—and he has voluntarily chosen to be an agent of the government. How shall he ever know well that he is and does as an officer of the government, or as a man, until he is obliged to consider whether he will treat me, his neighbor, for whom he has respect, as a neighbor and well-disposed man, or as a maniac and disturber of the peace, and see if he can get over this obstruction to his neighborliness without a ruder and more impetuous thought or speech corresponding with his action.

==== Trial strategies ====
Some civil disobedients feel it is incumbent upon them to accept punishment because of their belief in the validity of the social contract, which is held to bind all to obey the laws that a government meeting certain standards of legitimacy has established, or else suffer the penalties set out in the law. Other civil disobedients who favour the existence of government still do not believe in the legitimacy of their particular government or do not believe in the legitimacy of a particular law it has enacted. Anarchistic civil disobedients do not believe in the legitimacy of any government, so see no need to accept punishment for a violation of criminal law.

===== Pleading guilty =====
An important decision for civil disobedients is whether to plead guilty. There is much debate on this point, as some believe that it is a civil disobedient's duty to submit to the punishment prescribed by law, while others believe that defending oneself in court will increase the possibility of changing the unjust law. It has also been argued that either choice is compatible with the spirit of civil disobedience. ACT UP's Civil Disobedience Training handbook states that a civil disobedient who pleads guilty is essentially stating, "Yes, I committed the act of which you accuse me. I don't deny it; in fact, I am proud of it. I feel I did the right thing by violating this particular law; I am guilty as charged", but that pleading not guilty sends a message of, "Guilt implies wrong-doing. I feel I have done no wrong. I may have violated some specific laws, but I am guilty of doing no wrong. I, therefore, plead not guilty." A plea of no contest is sometimes regarded as a compromise between the two. One defendant accused of illegally protesting nuclear power, when asked to enter his plea, stated, "I plead for the beauty that surrounds us"; this is known as a "creative plea", and will usually be interpreted as a plea of not guilty.

When the Committee for Non-Violent Action sponsored a protest in August 1957, at the Camp Mercury nuclear test site near Las Vegas, Nevada, 13 of the protesters attempted to enter the test site knowing that they faced arrest. At an announced time, one by one they crossed a line and were immediately arrested. They were put on a bus and taken to the Nye County seat of Tonopah, Nevada, and arraigned for trial before the local Justice of the Peace, that afternoon. A civil rights attorney, Francis Heisler, had volunteered to defend the accused, advising them to plead nolo contendere rather than guilty or not guilty. They were found guilty and given suspended sentences, conditional on not reentering the test site.

Howard Zinn writes,

There may be many times when protesters choose to go to jail, as a way of continuing their protest, as a way of reminding their countrymen of injustice. But that is different than the notion that they must go to jail as part of a rule connected with civil disobedience. The key point is that the spirit of protest should be maintained all the way, whether it is done by remaining in jail, or by evading it. To accept jail penitently as an accession to "the rules" is to switch suddenly to a spirit of subservience, to demean the seriousness of the protest ... In particular, the neo-conservative insistence on a guilty plea should be eliminated.

Sometimes the prosecution proposes a plea bargain to civil disobedients, as in the case of the Camden 28, in which the defendants were offered an opportunity to plead guilty to one misdemeanour count and receive no jail time. In some mass arrest situations, the activists decide to use solidarity tactics to secure the same plea bargain for everyone.

But some activists have opted to enter a blind plea, pleading guilty without any plea agreement in place. Mahatma Gandhi pleaded guilty and told the court, "I am here to ... submit cheerfully to the highest penalty that can be inflicted upon me for what in law is a deliberate crime and what appears to me to be the highest duty of a citizen."

===== Allocution =====
Some civil disobedience defendants choose to make a defiant speech, or a speech explaining their actions, in allocution. In U.S. v. Burgos-Andujar, a defendant who was involved in a movement to stop military exercises by trespassing on US Navy property argued to the court in allocution that "the ones who are violating the greater law are the members of the Navy". As a result, the judge increased her sentence from 40 to 60 days. This action was upheld because, according to the US Court of Appeals for the First Circuit, her statement suggested a lack of remorse, an attempt to avoid responsibility for her actions, and even a likelihood of repeating her illegal actions. Some of the other allocution speeches given by the protesters complained about mistreatment from government officials.

Tim DeChristopher gave an allocution statement to the court describing the US as "a place where the rule of law was created through acts of civil disobedience" and arguing, "Since those bedrock acts of civil disobedience by our founding fathers, the rule of law in this country has continued to grow closer to our shared higher moral code through the civil disobedience that drew attention to legalized injustice."

===== Trial strategies =====
Steven Barkan writes that if defendants plead not guilty, "they must decide whether their primary goal will be to win an acquittal and avoid imprisonment or a fine, or to use the proceedings as a forum to inform the jury and the public of the political circumstances surrounding the case and their reasons for breaking the law via civil disobedience." A technical defence may enhance the chances for acquittal but increase the possibility of additional proceedings and of reduced press coverage. During the Vietnam War era, the Chicago Eight used a political defence, but Benjamin Spock used a technical defence. In countries such as the United States, whose laws guarantee the right to a jury trial but do not excuse lawbreaking for political purposes, some civil disobedients seek jury nullification. Over the years, this has been made more difficult by court decisions such as Sparf v. United States, which held that the judge need not inform jurors of their nullification prerogative, and United States v. Dougherty, which held that the judge need not allow defendants to openly seek jury nullification.

==== Choices made by the legal system ====
British judge Lord Hoffman writes that "In deciding whether or not to impose punishment, the most important consideration would be whether it would do more harm than good. This means that the objector has no right not to be punished. It is a matter for the state (including the judges) to decide on utilitarian grounds whether to do so or not." Hoffman also asserted that while the "rules of the game" for civil disobedients were to remain non-violent while breaking the law, the authorities must recognize that demonstrators are acting out of their conscience in pursuit of democracy. "When it comes to punishment, the court should take into account their personal convictions", he said.

=== Choices made by society ===
In addition to legal action, civil disobedients may be affected socially. For example, student protesters may be suspended or expelled from school. Civil disobedients may be disowned by or become estranged from their families. Some employers may prefer to hire people who did not engage in civil disobedience or fire employees who do.

== Legal theory ==
Governments have generally not recognized the legitimacy of civil disobedience or viewed political objectives as an excuse for breaking the law. Specifically, the law usually distinguishes between criminal motive and criminal intent; the offender's motives or purposes may be admirable and praiseworthy, but his intent may still be criminal. For example, a protester may be motivated by a desire to increase awareness about an injustice and intend to block traffic on a street, and it is the intention, rather than the motivation, that is criminally significant. Hence the saying that "if there is any possible justification of civil disobedience, it must come from outside the legal system."

One theory is that, while disobedience may be helpful, any great amount of it undermines the law by encouraging general disobedience which is neither conscientious nor of social benefit. Therefore, conscientious lawbreakers must be punished.

Courts have distinguished between two types of civil disobedience: "Indirect civil disobedience involves violating a law which is not, itself, the object of protest, whereas direct civil disobedience involves protesting the existence of a particular law by breaking that law."

During the Vietnam War, courts typically refused to excuse the perpetrators of illegal protests from punishment on the basis of their challenging the legality of the Vietnam War; the courts ruled it was a political question. The necessity defence has sometimes been used as a shadow defence by civil disobedients to deny guilt without denouncing their politically motivated acts, and to present their political beliefs in the courtroom. Court cases such as United States v. Schoon have greatly curtailed the availability of the political necessity defence. Likewise, when Carter Wentworth was charged for his role in the Clamshell Alliance's 1977 illegal occupation of the Seabrook Station Nuclear Power Plant, the judge instructed the jury to disregard his competing harms defence, and he was found guilty. Fully Informed Jury Association activists have sometimes handed out educational leaflets inside courthouses despite admonitions not to; according to the association, many of them have escaped prosecution because "prosecutors have reasoned (correctly) that if they arrest fully informed jury leafleters, the leaflets will have to be given to the leafleter's own jury as evidence."

Along with giving the offender his just deserts, achieving crime control via incapacitation and deterrence is a major goal of criminal punishment. Brownlee says "Bringing in deterrence at the level of justification detracts from the law's engagement in a moral dialogue with the offender as a rational person because it focuses attention on the threat of punishment and not the moral reasons to follow this law."

== Actions that are outside of civil disobedience ==
Michael Bayles argues that if a person violates a law to create a test case as to the constitutionality of a law, and then wins his case, then that act did not constitute civil disobedience.

Breaking the law for self-gratification, as in the case of a cannabis user who does not direct his act at securing the repeal of amendment of the law, is not civil disobedience. Likewise, a protester who attempts to escape punishment by committing the crime covertly and avoiding attribution, or by denying having committed the crime, or by fleeing the jurisdiction, is generally not called a civil disobedient.

== See also ==
- Anti-establishment – Opposition to the conventional social, political, and economic principles of a society
- Agorism – Canadian-American anarchist (1947–2004)
- Astroturfing – Public relations tactic using fake grassroots movements
- Billboard hacking – Illegal alteration of a billboard
- Civil resistance – Political action that relies on the use of non-violent methods by civil groups
- Civilian-based defense – Non-military action by a social group
- Climate disobedience
- Colour revolution – 21st century protests in Eastern Europe
- Conscientious objector – Person refusing military service on moral grounds
- Counterculture – Subculture whose values and norms of behavior deviate from those of mainstream society
- Counter-economics – Economic theory and method
- Culture jamming – Form of protest to subvert media culture
- Demonstration – Collective action supporting a cause
- Dissent – Non-agreement or opposition to authority
- Direct action – Form of activism in which power is used
- Diversity of tactics – Social phenomenon
- Ecoterrorism – Act of violence committed in support of environmental causes
- Extinction Rebellion – Environmental pressure group
- Gene Sharp – American political scientist (1928–2018)
- Grassroots – Movement based on local communities
- Grey market – Commodity trade outside of original producer's distribution channel
- Hunt sabotage – Interference with hunting by activists
- Indian independence movement – Movement to end British rule in India
- Insubordination – Act of willfully disobeying one's superior
- Internet activism – Use of the internet to facilitate activism
- K. L. Nursey album – Rare collection of Indian independence struggle
- Malicious compliance – Intentionally causing harm by following a superior's orders
- Mass incidents in China – Government term for large-scale protests
- Minority influence – Form of social influence
- Nonconformism to the established Church of England
- Non-conformists of the 1930s – Avantgarde movement during the inter-war period in France
- Nonviolent resistance – Act of protest through nonviolent means
- Nonviolent revolution – Civil resistance to bring about the departure of governments
- Off-the-grid – Not being connected to public utilities
- Protest art – Creative works produced by activists
- Satyagraha – Form of nonviolent resistance
- Tree sitting – Occupying trees as a political protest
- Underground culture – Alternative cultures that differ from the mainstream
- User revolt – Type of website-based social conflict
