= Principle of double effect =

Christian ethical consideration

The principle of double effect (Note: Also known as the rule of double effect, the doctrine of double effect, double-effect reasoning, or simply double effect, and often abbreviated as DDE or PDE.) is a set of ethical criteria which Christian philosophers have advocated for evaluating the permissibility of acting when one's otherwise legitimate act may also cause an effect one would otherwise be obliged to avoid. The first known example of double-effect reasoning is Thomas Aquinas' treatment of homicidal self-defense, in his work Summa Theologica.

This set of criteria states that, if an action has foreseeable harmful effects that are practically inseparable from the good effect, it is justifiable if the following are true:

- the nature of the act is itself good, or at least morally neutral;
- the agent intends the good effect and does not intend the bad effect, either as a means to the good or as an end in itself;
- the good effect outweighs the bad effect in circumstances sufficiently grave to justify causing the bad effect and the agent exercises due diligence to minimize the harm.

== Intentional harm versus side effects ==
The principle of double effect is based on the idea that there is a morally relevant difference between an "intended" consequence of an act and one that is foreseen by the actor but not calculated to achieve their motive. This distinction becomes clear when comparing different types of military actions, such as those of a tactical bomber versus a terror bomber. A tactical bomber engages in strikes on enemy military targets, knowing that some civilian casualties are a foreseen but unintended consequence. However, their intention is the military objective. In contrast, a terror bomber deliberately targets civilians to induce fear and achieve political objectives, making the harm to civilians the means to an end. While civilian casualties occur in both cases, the tactical bomber’s intention is not to cause harm, and the action itself is aimed at a legitimate military goal. Because advocates of double effect propose that consequentially similar acts can be morally different, double effect is most often criticized by consequentialists who consider the consequences of actions entirely determinative of the action's morality.

In their use of the distinction between intent and foresight without intent, advocates of double effect make three arguments. First, that intent differs from foresight, even in cases in which one foresees an effect as inevitable. Second, that one can apply the distinction to specific sets of cases found in military ethics (terror bombing/strategic bombing), medical ethics (craniotomy/hysterectomy), and social ethics (euthanasia). Third, that the distinction has moral relevance, importance, or significance.

A common application of the principle is in the use of opioids to treat pain, but which also hasten someone’s death, when treating imminently terminal patients.

The doctrine consists of four conditions that must be satisfied before an act is morally permissible:

1. The nature-of-the-act condition. The action itself must be morally good or, at the very least, morally neutral.
2. The right-intention condition. The intention must be the achieving of only the good effect, with the bad effect being only an unintended side effect. All reasonable measures to avoid or mitigate the bad effect must be taken.
3. The concurrence condition. The good effect must be caused by the action at least as immediately (in terms of causality, not—necessarily—temporally) as the bad effect. It is impermissible to attempt to bring about an indirect good with a direct evil.
  Also formulated as:
  - The means-end condition. The bad effect must not be the means by which one achieves the good effect. Good ends do not justify evil means. (Note: It is debated whether these formulations are equivalent, or whether one or the other suffers from difficulty in distinguishing when something is the means by which a good is achieved, and when merely a foreseen-but-undesired side-effect; see 4.2, "The Problem of Closeness", in.)
4. The proportionality condition. There must be a proportionately grave reason for permitting the evil effect.

== Criticisms ==
While some consequentialists may reject the principle, Alison McIntyre states that "many criticisms of the principle of double effect do not proceed from consequentialist assumptions".

Alyson Hoyt argues that the DDE should not be used in wartime due to its potential for misuse and the complexity of modern warfare. She claims that while the DDE aims to justify actions with unintended harmful consequences, it can be easily manipulated to rationalize civilian casualties as mere "side effects" of military objectives.

Similarly, Robert L. Holmes agrees that the principle of double effect relies upon an unambiguous distinction between the harmful means which are utilized and the unintended side effects which result from adopting those means. He further argues that the context in which modern war is waged, however, creates conditions that do not allow for such a clear distinction. This ambiguity allows those who invoke the principle of double effect to characterize virtually any harmful action initiated during a war as being unintended and executed with good military intentions. As Holmes observes, the principle "legitimizes every action legitimized by just necessity (military necessity adopted to a just war), provided only that one [does] not intend the harm that he does. In fact, no action whatsoever is prohibited by the principle as long as one acts from a good intention." This suggests that the principle of double effect is "limitlessly elastic" by its very nature. Holmes argues that this is ethically problematic because "a necessary condition of the justifiable pursuit of any objectives in war by any means whatever.. is that one be justified in engaging in such killing and violence in the first place."

== See also ==
- Trolley problem – a moral dilemma exploring the principle of double effect
- Competing harms and necessity – similar theories in law
- Lesser of two evils principle
- Re A (conjoined twins) – a legal case in which the principle of double effect was part of the deliberations
