= Political trial =

A political trial is a criminal case wherein the defendant is tried for reasons considered politically motivated—that is, those with varying degrees of opposition to government policy—in order to effectively silence or discredit them. It generally occurs in states with minimal rule of law protections, alternatively characterized as authoritarian, illiberal, or totalitarian.

== Definitions ==
=== Trial against behaviours claiming cultural pluralism ===
T. Becker writes that "in a sense, all trials are political. Since courts are government agencies and judges are part of the 'system' all judicial decisions can be considered political." A political trial is characterized by the fact that public opinion and public attitudes on one or more social questions will inevitably have an effect on the decision.

Political trials can include trials for civil disobedience and other forms of protest against government policy. The government may use prosecution to frighten potential supporters and sympathizers of a movement, and to discredit a movement and compel its members to spend time, money and energy avoiding conviction and imprisonment. A defendant in a political trial may offer a "legal defense" or a "political defense". A technical defense would argue that the alleged crime did not occur as a matter of fact or law. In a political defense, a defendant may assert the political motivations behind the conduct in an attempt to convince the jury or the public of the justness of the political motivations and of the injustice of the prosecution.

It has been suggested that in political cases justice will be better served if the lists used to impanel jurors are more complete and if challenges and excuses are minimized, in order to ensure that the jury more accurately reflects the diversity of the community.

=== Trial in order to curb opponents against the government ===
When a political trial is "an examination before a court concerning the conduct of governmental affairs or somehow relating to government", one can speak of political justice; if bias is not only cultural but systemic, politics has an impact on criminal procedure chosen for the trial and on the impartiality of the Court. There is some question as to whether political trials are necessary or if they are a disease of politics and law. Political justice is defined in terms of the state's reaction to perceived threat; and political prisoners are defined as those incarcerated because of either political crime (political criminals) or political justice (victims of repression). Defendants in political trials tend to participate in the proceedings more than defendants in non-political cases, as they may have greater ability to depart from courtroom norms to speak to political and moral issues.

== Examples ==
=== Biased trials in democracies ===
==== Political trials in the United Kingdom ====
In Northern Ireland, Diplock Courts tried anyone charged with a politically related offence and provided for delays in permitting legal access to suspects where the suspect could be interrogated for up to seven days. While suspects retained the right to silence, it was on condition that if they chose to rely upon it, a trial judge could later draw an adverse inference from their silence. One notable case, of many, arising from the British political courts in Northern Ireland is that of Belfast man Christy Walsh case.

==== Political trials in Colonial America ====
- The trial of Anne Hutchinson has been described as a political trial.

==== Political trials in the United States ====
- Haymarket affair
- Sacco and Vanzetti
- Smith Act trials of Communist Party leaders, which was described as something close to "a political trial with criminal overtones".
- Dr. Spock trial
- Catonsville Nine
- Bobby Seale
- Chicago Seven
- New Haven Black Panther Party trials
- Panther 21
- Camden 28
- Attica prison riot
- Wounded Knee Occupation
- Winooski 44
- Seabrook Station Nuclear Power Plant (anti-nuclear protests)
- Tim DeChristopher

=== Political trials in totalitarian states ===
When the Soviet Union was created, the trial of Sofia Panina was one of the first political trials.

== See also ==
- Cronyism
- In-group favoritism
- Political defense
- Revolutionary Tribunal
- Scapegoating
- Show trial
