= Political defense =

A political defense is a defense to a criminal charge in which the defendant asserts at trial the political motivations behind the allegedly criminal conduct. In some circumstances, the defendant might assert political motivations in order to seek acquittal. In other circumstances, defendants might not have a realistic hope of acquittal but may nevertheless use the trial as a forum for expressing political views.

A political defense is related to a legal defense. A legal defense, or a "technical defense", seeks acquittal by demonstrating that the defendant's conduct did not satisfy all of the elements of the alleged crime. In a political defense, the defendant might concede that the conduct took place, but attempt to convince the jury or the public that the conduct was inherently just because of its political motivation. Some defendants might offer both a technical defense and a political defense.

== Types of political defenses ==
The form that a political defense will take depends on its objective, audience, message, legal theory, and tactics.

=== Objectives ===
There are several reasons why a defendant might attempt a political defense.

- Acquittal. Where the conduct is known to have taken place, a political defense might be the only way of obtaining an acquittal.
- Public advocacy. Defendants might use the opportunity to make their political statements in a forum that they believe is likely to be heard by the public.
- Personal integrity. Defendants who have committed acts of conscience such as civil disobedience might desire to have their actions judged on political terms rather than on legal terms.
- Confronting the state. Where the conduct being prosecuted was part of a protest against government action, then defendants may use their trial to state their grievances directly to the state, as embodied by the trial court.
- Extracting statements from opponents. Where defendants are able to subpoena governmental officers or other political opponents, or to obtain documents through pre-trial discovery, a political defense may permit them to document other parties' unjust conduct. In the Chicago Conspiracy Trial, for example, defendants subpoenaed Mayor Richard Daley in an attempt to elicit information about his role in contributing to the violence for which the defendants were blamed.

=== Audience ===
Each of these reasons implies a different audience for the political statement. Where the defendant seeks acquittal, the principal audience is the jury. Where the defendant seeks public advocacy, the principal audience is the media that are covering the trial, and through them the public. Where the defendant seeks personal integrity, the audience is himself or herself, or possibly also any collaborators in the conduct being prosecuted.

This difference may influence the choice of legal strategy: if the purpose is public advocacy, then a defendant may attempt to include political statements that would be persuasive to the public even if they would not be persuasive to a jury; the defendant might not be acquitted, but might succeed in communicating the message to the public.

=== Message ===
Defendants may have been motivated by several political purposes, and they may choose which message to communicate at trial. This choice is most important where the objective is public advocacy. In other cases, the choice may be more evident: for purposes of personal integrity and confrontation of the state, the defendant probably knows the political views that they seek to communicate; for purposes of acquittal and extracting information from the state, there may be a limited number of arguments that are likely to be successful. However, where the objective is to attract and influence public opinion, the message that is most likely to succeed is not necessarily the same as the political view that principally motivated the defendants.

=== Legal Theories ===
Rules of evidence require that any statement make in court must be relevant. Defendants must have a legal theory of innocence for which their political message is a necessary element to be proven.

There are several legal theories that allow defendants might make political statements within a criminal proceeding. They can be divided into three categories: affirmative defenses, inadequacy of mens rea, and shadow defenses.

==== Affirmative Defenses ====
An affirmative defense is a defense established by law, according to which the law endorses conduct that is otherwise illegal.

- Necessity Defense. A necessity defense is a common law doctrine according to which individuals are exonerated from otherwise criminal conduct where that conduct was intended to avoid a greater harm. Some defendants of civil disobedience prosecutions, such as the Winooski 44, have successfully convinced juries that their protests were necessary in order to convince the government to modify allegedly harmful policies.
- International law defense. Some courts have held that the Nuremberg Principles of international law establish a duty on individuals to prevent others from committing violations of international law. Some defendants protesting violations of international law, such as a 1980 prosecution of people protesting the U.S. military activity in Central America, have been acquitted after successfully convincing judges to allow an international law defense.
- Defense of others. Some states allow people to take action that is otherwise illegal where it is necessary to protect a third person from harm.
- Execution of public duty. Similar to the "defense of others" doctrine, some states have laws that require people to take measures to prevent public harms.

Each of these defenses requires that the defendant show that their actions were mitigating or preventing some greater harm or some other illegal conduct. In order to prove this defense, the defendants will be able to submit evidence and witness testimony describing their motivations or communicating other political messages.

==== Inadequacy of mens rea ====
Mens rea refers to the mental state that is required in order to be found guilty of the offense. Some statutes require that the person not only knew that they were committing the illegal act, but also that they did so with an unlawful purpose. When charged with this kind of crime, defendants will be permitted to testify in detail about the political views that motivated their action.

==== Shadow defense ====
A shadow defense is a legal defense that will enable the defendant to communicate their message, even though the legal defense itself is not likely to succeed. A shadow defense can be any legal theory, including an affirmative defenses. What makes a legal theory a "shadow defense" is that the defendant does not expect to be successful as a matter of law; it is, instead, a pretext for bringing information into the court that would otherwise be irrelevant and therefore inadmissible.

For example, in the trial of the Camden 28, the defendants made an entrapment defense alleging that FBI agents had convinced the group to undertake their allegedly illegal conduct. While making their entrapment defense, the defendants called witnesses to discuss the history of the use of agents provocateurs by the government and also the history of civil disobedience; they also called character witnesses such as a defendant's mother in order to discuss the defendant's peaceful tendency and also his political beliefs.

The shadow defense is related to the idea of jury nullification. Jury nullification occurs when juries decide to acquit defendants even though the defendant has violated the letter of the law. Juries might seek nullification where they agree with the political motivations of the defendant. However, the defendant must first present information about their political motivations to the jury. A shadow defense might be used to convey this information to the jury, not because the defense itself is likely to succeed but because it provides a vehicle for informing jurors about sympathetic personal characteristics of the defendants.

Other causes of jury nullification may include a belief that the law at issue is unjust or unduly harsh, a belief that the prosecution is abusing its power, or a belief that the defendant is not receiving fair treatment on account of their race, color, creed, sexual orientation, or other characteristics.

=== Tactics ===
Defendants may use other tactics to communicate their message.

- Pro se representation. Defendants who choose to represent themselves are typically allowed greater latitude than lawyers are, and may be able to directly communicate their political message during opening statements, closing statements, or witness examination.
- Defendant conduct. Defendants might make non-verbal statements by virtue of their courtroom conduct. During the Chicago conspiracy trial, for example, defendants wore judges' robes and police uniforms to court in order to communicate their irreverence for orthodox structures of government power.
- Conduct outside the courtroom. The defendants or their supporters may conduct advocacy outside of the courtroom, through media or other events. This might not change the course of the trial itself, but it uses the event of the trial as an opportunity for political advocacy.

== See also ==
- Political bias
- Political trial
- Political prisoner
