= Necessity in English criminal law =

Defence for breaking the law

In English law, the defence of necessity recognises that there may be situations of such overwhelming urgency that a person must be allowed to respond by breaking the law. There have been very few cases in which the defence of necessity has succeeded, and in general terms there are very few situations where such a defence could even be applicable. The defining feature of such a defence is that the situation is not caused by another person (which would fall under either duress or self-defence) and that the accused was in genuine risk of immediate harm or danger.

For the most part crimes that could be justified as necessary are minor in nature, such as driving over the speed limit to reach medical care, or damaging property to escape a fire. In almost all cases where a serious crime has taken place, necessity is unlikely to be a successful defence as courts have mostly taken the view that directly harming another person could not be justified even by extreme circumstances unless it directly prevented immediate serious harm or death. Even if a person were already likely to die, and their death would allow others to survive, killing them is not necessary until the point where harm is imminently likely to occur to the others and if that harm is not immediate, then necessity cannot apply. As such the circumstances where necessity could apply to a serious crime are extremely narrow, involving two or more people in an immediately life-threatening situation where only one could survive. Even in this situation, as the law does allow for a person not to take actions that would save another person if to do so would put their own life at risk, it is seldom strictly necessary for one person to kill another, one allowing the other to die in the course of the situation, then saving themselves.

The Crown Prosecution Service has historically chosen to exercise its discretion not to prosecute those cases where it believes potential defendants have acted reasonably in all the circumstances, and as such where necessity is a strong defence.

== History ==
This defence was used in the early trial of Regina v. Dudley & Stephens (1884) 14 QBD 273 DC, where four shipwrecked sailors were cast adrift in a small boat without provisions. To save themselves, the three strongest decided to eat the fourth, the 17-year-old cabin boy. The court ruled that cannibalising the boy was not urgently necessary. Even though the cabin boy would almost certainly have died of natural causes, the sailors killed the boy intentionally and were guilty of murder. There was some degree of necessity arising from the threat of starvation but, at any moment, a ship could have sailed over the horizon to save them as, indeed, the three were rescued. Since they could never be sure that the killing was actually necessary from one minute to the next, the defence was denied. Cannibalism itself is not an offence so long as the death occurs naturally.

Dudley and Stephens were convicted of murder and sentenced to be hanged; however, their sentence was later reduced to just six months in prison. The third man, Brooks, was not tried, as he had not participated in the murder. The principles from this case form the basis of the defence of necessity not being available for murder.

== The principles ==
There must be an urgent and immediate threat to life which creates a situation in which the defendant reasonably believes that a proportionate response to that threat is to break the law. This reflects the distinction between the defences of necessity and duress in that the former is pressure of circumstances arising naturally, whereas the latter is a threat from an entirely human agency that overpowers the will of the defendant. The general approach was laid down by Lord Denning in Southwark London Borough Council v Williams (1971) 2 AER 175 that necessity should be denied as a general defence because otherwise anarchy and disorder would follow. If hunger was allowed to become the basis of necessity, any poor person might seek to justify burglary to steal food by arguing that he or she had reasonably believed that this was a proportionate response to the threat of malnutrition. Thus, the fact that hunger does not arise spontaneously, and there are other ways in which to seek relief from poverty (e.g. work or by seeking welfare support or charity), would deny the defence of necessity. The Canadian courts put the issue succinctly. In Perka v The Queen (1984) 2 SCR 232, Dickson J. held at para. 250 that

If the defence of necessity is to form a valid and consistent part of our criminal law it must, as has been universally recognised, be strictly controlled and scrupulously limited to situations that correspond to its underlying rationale.

When considering necessity in R v Cole (1994) Crim LR 582, Simon Brown LJ held that the peril relied on to support the plea of necessity lacked imminence and the degree of directness and immediacy required of the link between the suggested peril and the offence charged. This defendant robbed two building societies in order to repay debts. The form of defence was "duress by circumstance" which attempts to extend the coverage of duress by borrowing the idea of an uncontrollable external circumstance forcing a choice by the defendant to break the law.

== Medical necessity ==
In Quayle and Others v R; Attorney General's Reference (No. 2 of 2004) (2005) EWCA Crim 1415 each defendant appealed convictions associated variously with the cultivation or possession of cannabis resin to be used for pain management. The choice facing the appellants was not severe pain without cannabis or absence of pain with cannabis, rather it was the absence of pain with adverse side effects without cannabis, and absence of pain with minimal side effects with cannabis. The difference was restricted to the adverse side effects which, however unpleasant, could not sensibly be said to raise a prima facie possibility of serious injury, let alone one such as would overwhelm the will of the defendant. There was no evidence from an objective standpoint that the appellants were acting reasonably and proportionately to a threat of injury. The evidence was clear that it was possible for the appellants to control pain by conventional and legal means. To admit the medical use of cannabis on the ground of necessity would defeat the legislative purpose underpinning the Misuse of Drugs Act 1971. Further, for the defence of necessity to succeed, the threat of injury must be immediate and imminent and come from an extraneous source. The parties were responding to continuous pain over a period of time and, in any event, pain is too subjective to qualify as an external threat. There was nothing urgent that overwhelmed their will to resist. The parties then argued that the law breached Article 8 European Convention on Human Rights by interfering with the right of privacy. Interference with the right of respect for private life is permissible under Article 8(2) if "in accordance with the law and ... necessary in a democratic society ... for the prevention of disorder or crime, for the protection of health or morals, or the protection of the rights and freedoms of others". Within the limits indicated in Taylor (Joseph) v Lancashire County Council (2005) EWCA Civ 284, the court's decision would involve an evaluation of the medical and scientific evidence, but their conclusion was that this was a policy matter more properly within the remit of the relevant minister. Thus, this unlawful self-help did not qualify as necessity and did not fall within the protection of Article 8 ECHR.

In R v Altham (2006) EWCA Crim 7 the defendant used cannabis for pain relief following injury in a road accident. He was charged with possession under s. 5(2) Misuse of Drugs Act 1971. The judge at first instance refused to leave the defence of medical necessity to the jury so the defendant changed his plea to guilty. The Court of Appeal held that Article 3 ECHR (not to subject a person to inhuman or degrading treatment) does apply to the state. The defendant argued that using cannabis was the only way in which his symptoms could be alleviated and that he could not do so without committing a criminal offence. Thus, the state, by prosecuting him, subjected him to degrading treatment. The court said that the state, by refusing cannabis, neither did nor refrained from doing anything that would subject the defendant to degrading treatment. The state had done nothing to change the defendant's condition for better or worse, and there was nothing to require the court to read the Misuse of Drugs Act 1971 as subject to a defence of medical necessity. The court applied Quayle where the focus was on Article 8, and the defence of necessity was denied because it would be in conflict with the purpose and effect of the legislative scheme.

In Re A (Children) (Conjoined Twins: Surgical Separation) (2000) 4 AER 961 Jodie and Mary were ischiopagus conjoined twins (i.e. joined at the pelvis) and the Court of Appeal had to decide whether it was lawful to perform surgery to separate them when the separation would kill Mary. If the operation did not take place there was evidence that both would die within six months. The court proceeded on the basis that the potential charge would be murder in that, although the girls were physically joined, they were separate "lives in being". The court decided that the operation would be lawful. Ward LJ concluded that, by analogy with self-defence, it was lawful to kill Mary because she was, albeit lawfully, killing Jodie. Ward reasoned that causing Mary's death did not breach the public policy of "sanctity of life" because of the "quasi self-defence", but Brooke LJ, rejected self-defence because Mary was not unlawfully threatening Jodie's life. He concluded that necessity rather than duress of circumstances would apply because the doctor's will was not being overwhelmed by the threat. Instead, the doctors were making a rational choice to adopt the lesser of two evils, i.e. the death of one rather than the death of both twins. Ward LJ reasoned that separation surgery was clearly in Jodie's best interests, but not in Mary's best interests because it denied her "inherent right to life". Given the conflict of the children's interests and the consequent conflict in the doctor's duties to each child, there was "no other way of dealing with it than by choosing the lesser of the two evils and so finding the least detrimental alternative." Jodie could benefit from the surgery to enjoy probably a near-normal life; refusal to allow separation would result in the death of both twins. So "the least detrimental alternative" was to allow separation. Necessity would not usually be allowed as a defence to murder, but Brooke LJ distinguished R v Dudley and Stephens on the basis that the doctors were not selecting the victim unlike the cabin boy in Dudley. The decision is restricted to cases of medical necessity and a conflict of duty owed both by doctors to different patients and by parents to their children but does provide an interesting expansion of the law albeit, as Michalowski (2001) comments, it poses difficult questions as to who should take such decisions on behalf of patients.
