= Winooski =

Winooski is the name of the following places in the United States:

- Winooski, Vermont, city
- Winooski, Wisconsin, ghost town
- Winooski Falls Mill District, historical district
- Winooski River, river
- Winooski Turnpike, road

== See also ==
- Winooski 44, American political protest group
