= Re A (conjoined twins) =

English legal case

- Court: Court of Appeal of England and Wales
- Decided: 22 September 2000
- Citation: [2001] 2 WLR 480, [2000] 3 FCR 577, [2000] HRLR 721, [2001] Fam Law 18, [2000] Lloyd's Rep Med 425, [2001] Fam 147, [2000] EWCA Civ 254, 9 BHRC 261, (2001) 57 BMLR 1, [2000] 4 All ER 961, [2000] Lloyds Rep Med 425, [2001] 1 FLR 1, [2001] UKHRR 1

Case history
- Prior action: Declaration of lawfulness to proposed surgery in the High Court

Court membership
- Judges sitting: Lord Justice Ward, Lord Justice Brooke, Lord Justice Robert Walker

Case opinions
- Appeal dismissed; however reasoning of single judge disapproved, decision made on fresh basis.

Keywords
- Necessity; Medical law; moral dilemma; surgery bringing about death of weaker conjoined twin; lawfulness

Re A (Note: "Re" is a word commonly used in legal contexts meaning "about" or "regarding". "A" refers to the twins, used instead of their names to preserve anonymity.) (conjoined twins) [2001] 2 WLR 480 is a Court of Appeal (England and Wales) decision on the separation of conjoined twins. The case raised legal and ethical dilemmas. It was ruled it would be permissible to sever and thus kill in a palliative, sympathetic manner the weaker twin to save the much stronger one. The case was among those where it would be lawful to conduct surgery against the wishes of the parents. The parents' faith was held not to be overriding, nor general applicability of the outcome to all such cases.

== Facts ==
Rosie and Gracie Attard, who were born in Manchester on 8 August 2000, were conjoined twins who were joined at the abdomen. During legal deliberations, they were given the public pseudonyms "Mary" and "Jodie", respectively.

The medical evidence showed that Gracie was the stronger sibling, sustaining the life of Rosie. Rosie had severe brain damage, very little heart function and no functioning lungs, and survived only due to a shared common artery supplied by Gracie. If surgically separated, Gracie was assessed as having a 94%-99% survival rate, but Rosie was guaranteed to die. If left conjoined, then their life expectancy was estimated to be around six months.

Their Maltese parents, Rina and Michelangelo Attard of Xagħra, Gozo, had strong Roman Catholic beliefs on the sanctity of life (cf. Roman Catholic Church and abortion). They did not consider abortion on learning that the twins were conjoined, and on their birth decided not to separate the girls, even if it meant both would die.

== Reasons of judgment and appeal decision ==
At first instance, Mr Justice Johnson was left to decide the case without any direct precedents to bind or guide him. He relied primarily on Airedale NHS Trust v Bland where it was declared acceptable to remove life support. He ruled separation would not be murder but a case of "passive euthanasia" in which food and hydration would be withdrawn.

The Court of Appeal agreed in outcome but rejected this analysis. The three appellate judges gave contrasting legal reasoning. Lord Justice Ward invoked the concept of self-defence suggesting that "If [Gracie] could speak she would surely protest, Stop it, [Rosie], you're killing me." Lord Justice Brooke relied upon R v Dudley and Stephens and invoked necessity as a defence. Lord Justice Robert Walker focused upon the morally understandable intention of the surgeons, and the great body of profession opinion, in concluding that surgery could go ahead.

=== Result ===
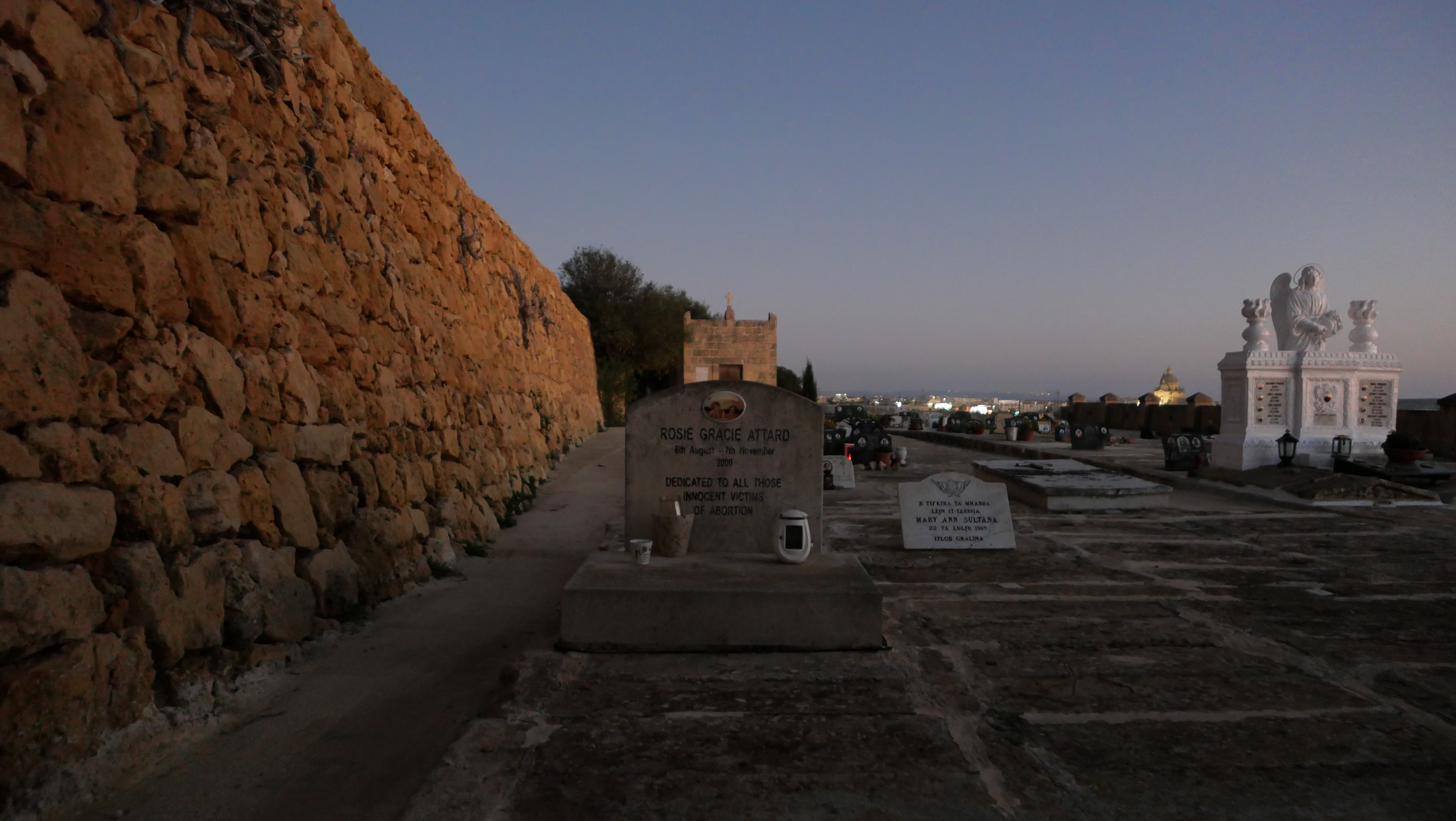
The grave of Rosie Attard in Xagħra on the Maltese island of Gozo

The 20-hour-long operation to separate the twins took place on 7 November 2000. As expected, Gracie survived the operation and Rosie died. Rosie's funeral took place on 19 January 2001 at the Basilica of the Nativity of Our Lady, Xagħra; the inscription on her tombstone reads:

DEDICATED TO ALL THOSE INNOCENT VICTIMS OF ABORTION

In 2014, when Gracie was 14 years old, she was living a reasonably normal life, had a younger sister, and was thinking about studying to become a physician. In 2020 she was described by surgeon Adrian Bianchi, who had stayed in touch with the family, as "stable, intelligent, independent" and "intent on establishing a professional career".

== See also ==
- Necessity in English law
