= United States v. Schoon =

US Court of Appeals decision

- Court: Court of Appeals for the Ninth Circuit
- Full case name: United States of America, Plaintiff-Appellee, v. Gregory D. Schoon, Defendant-Appellant
- Decided: July 29 1991

Holding
- Necessity defense cannot be raised by protestors who were charged with breaking a law other than the one they were specifically protesting.

Court membership
- Judges sitting: Farris, Boochever and Fernandez

Case opinions
- Majority: Boochever (opinion), joined by Farris
- Concurrence: Fernandez

United States v. Schoon, 939 F.2d 826 (1991), was a case decided by the United States Court of Appeals for the Ninth Circuit. The court's decision centered upon the legal defense of necessity as it relates to acts of civil disobedience and federal criminal charges.

== Background ==
On December 4, 1989, Schoon and approximately thirty people entered the Internal Revenue Service's local office in Tucson, Arizona. They began chanting a demand that U.S. tax dollars not be sent to El Salvador, and threw fake blood throughout the lobby. They were ordered by federal police to disperse or face arrest. The protestors refused to leave, and were subsequently arrested. They were charged with failing to comply with an order of a federal police officer and obstructing government function.

At trial, Schoon offered evidence of the conditions in El Salvador at the time. He argued that his actions in the IRS building were necessary to prevent further violence in El Salvador. The district court refused to admit this evidence, ruling that while Schoon had clearly humanitarian aims, the necessity defense was not applicable to his case.

== Opinion of the Court ==
=== Majority ===
The majority began by summarizing the factors that make up the necessity defense, all of which must be met for the defense to apply:

1. The defendant was faced with two bad options and chose the lesser;
2. He acted to prevent imminent harm;
3. He reasonably believed that his action could prevent that harm; and
4. He had no reasonable legal alternative

The court then explained that while those factors were not met in this case, and so Schoon's request could be denied on that basis alone, there was a "deeper, systemic reason" for rejecting Schoon's defense. This was a case of indirect civil disobedience, meaning that the law(s) violated were not the ones against which Schoon was protesting. The sit-ins used to protest racial segregation in the United States are an example of direct civil disobedience, since they involved violating the laws (segregated facilities) that were also the targets of the protest. In Schoon's case, by contrast, he was charged with noncompliance with a federal police officer's instructions and with obstructing the IRS's operations in the Tucson office, while his actions were to protest U.S. funds going to El Salvador.

Although the Ninth Circuit had routinely rejected the necessity defense as it applied to protestors, there had been no overall ruling that the defense was per se inapplicable. The court noted that necessity is a utilitarian defense, meaning that it applies where the harm caused by the defendant's actions outweighs the societal cost of inaction. For example, although it is illegal to escape from prison, the United States Supreme Court has ruled that the necessity defense applied to prisoners who escaped from a prison while it was on fire. The majority cited several other examples, such as a crew mutinying when their ship was not seaworthy and a court ruling that property could be destroyed to prevent the spread of fire.

This means that the defense only applies where the illegal actions actually prevent some greater harm. Moreover, society's condonation of something that the defendant sees as a harm precludes the raising of the necessity defense; it cannot be based on the defendant's subjective belief. Since the U.S. policy towards El Salvador had been established by the country's political leaders, Schoon could not raise the necessity defense without also being able to show that the policy was legally illegitimate, i.e. was unconstitutional or that it had not been properly enacted.

[A]s a matter of law, whenever Congress has decided a matter exclusively within its constitutionally-delineated realm of authority, its decision, be it in the form of policy or law, cannot constitute a cognizable harm.

Since U.S. policy towards El Salvador had been Congressionally approved, there could be no harm that Schoon's actions sought to address. Necessity only applies where the cost of the defendant's illegal actions was outweighed by its benefit, but that benefit is zero where there is no harm being resolved. For this reason, Schoon could not raise the necessity defense at his trial.

=== Concurrence ===
Judge Fernandez issued a brief concurring opinion, in which he agreed with the ruling as it applied to this case. He expressed some doubt, however, as to whether the necessity defense should be grounded solely in utilitarianism. He instead suggested that it should be grounded in "a concept of what is right and proper conduct under the circumstances." He acknowledged that "[the majority] is also probably right about the outcome of all other cases of this type in the future," but believed that previous Ninth Circuit precedent was not consistent with creating an absolute rule for cases of indirect civil disobedience.
