= Technical defense =

A technical defense is one used by a defendant to seek acquittal based on the technicalities of the law. It is in contrast to a political defense which seeks to use political arguments to persuade a jury to nullify. Sometimes the desire to convince a jury on political and moral grounds is so strong that political defendants will reject a potent technical defense.
