= K. L. Nursey album =

Rare collection of Indian independence struggle

The K. L. Nursey album, or the Collections of Photographs of Old Congress Party: KL Nursey, is a compilation of documentary photographs captured by an anonymous person. It contains 245 black-and-white photographs that cover the Civil Disobedience Movement of India. The album offers evidence that the movement involved counts of ordinary citizens, mostly women, of the then Bombay, who acted out of their own accord through an organization called Desh Sevika Sangh and not entirely through Mahatma Gandhi's prod. The album is currently with the Alkazi Foundation for the Arts (AFA).

The identity of K. L. Nursey is not known. According to historians, they could be Navin Khandwala, a Congress activist; the man who commissioned the photographs; or the person who curated and collated it into the album. According to Annalisa Mansukhani, Nursey could have been a staffer of The Times of India.

In October 2025, a few of the photos from the album were showcased in Durham, North Carolina.
