= Robert Johnson (judge) =

Sir Robert Lionel Johnson (9 February 1933 – 25 October 2020) was a British barrister and judge. He was a High Court judge, sitting in the Family Division from 1989 until 2004.
