= R v Perka =

Perka v The Queen
- Supreme Court of Canada

Hearing: January 31, February 1, 1984 Judgment: October 11, 1984
- Full case name: William Francis Perka, Paul Oscar Nelson, William Terry Hines and Stephen Earl Johnson v Her Majesty The Queen
- Citations: [1984] 2 S.C.R. 232 • (1984), 13 D.L.R. (4th) 1 • (1984), 14 C.C.C. (3d) 385 • (1984), 42 C.R. (3d) 113 • (1984), 28 B.C.L.R. (2d) 205
- Docket No.: 17217

Court membership
- Chief Justice: Brian Dickson; Puisne Justices: Roland Ritchie, Jean Beetz, Willard Estey, William McIntyre, Julien Chouinard, Antonio Lamer, Bertha Wilson, Gerald Le Dain

Reasons given
- Majority: Dickson J. (pp. 236-268), joined by Ritchie, Chouinard and Lamer JJ.
- Concurrence: Wilson J. (pp. 268-279)

R v Perka, [1984] 2 S.C.R. 232 is, along with R v Latimer, a leading Supreme Court of Canada decision on the criminal defence of necessity.

== Background ==
In 1979 a group of Cali, Colombia marijuana traffickers headed by Jaime deJesus Cordoba-Vargas and Jaime deJesus Marin-Jaramillo organized a venture to smuggle marijuana into the U.S. aboard the 168-foot (51 m) motor vessel Samarkanda, a surplus U.S. Navy net tender converted to a tugboat and once called Alexandra. The standard procedure for the group was to load contraband on "mother ships" in South America, sail north, then rendezvous with smaller "contact" vessels off the U.S. coast. They operated under the theory that if the ship picked up contraband on the high seas and delivered it on the high seas they would not violate any national laws except perhaps that of its flag country, Colombia. To a certain extent, the smugglers were correct.

=== The stranger on Whale Creek ===
In February 1979, the Drug Enforcement Administration in Seattle, Washington learned of a man attempting to buy beachfront property at the mouth of Whale Creek on the Quinault Indian Reservation on the Washington coast. He was interested in access to the beach since much of the coast in this area is high bluff. Agents identified the purchaser as Paul Oscar Nelson of Montesano, Washington and Marina Del Rey, California, already a defendant in a 1978 California cocaine case. Nelson had told undercover agents then that he worked for an organization that smuggled marijuana and cocaine into the U.S. Nelson was also in telephone contact with Port Townsend, used equipment dealer and former U.S. Navy officer William Francis Perka, suspected of being a navigator for the Cordoba organization.

The agents began to track Nelson in May as he acquired a custom-built trailer near Seattle, two yachts, the 35-foot (11 m) Schnapps and the 55-foot (17 m) Whitecap, and a 26-foot (7.9 m) motorhome. Agents watched while Nelson, Michael William Butler of Westport, Washington, Jaime Marin-Jaramillo and Roy David Thompson, a ham radio operator, installed radios in boats, a pickup truck, and the motor home, and gathered supplies for a long trip.

=== Dope from the sky ===
Samarkanda off the coast of Colombia in April 1979

At the same time, Samarkanda left from Tumaco, Colombia under the command of Marco Antonio Lopera-Penago with the intentions of smuggling cannabis to Juneau, Alaska. William Perka served as navigator and William Terry Hines, a San Rafael, California diesel mechanic served as engineer. Both Hines and Perka had served aboard Samarkanda before. The ship loitered off the coast of Colombia for three weeks. During that time a DC-6 aircraft made four trips dropping bales in shrimp nets, totalling about 634 bales of cannabis worth $6–7 million. The crew used a small boat to retrieve the bales. The plane also dropped a package giving instructions to Samarkanda to rendezvous with another ship.

Samarkanda, already known to U.S. authorities, was photographed by a U.S. Coast Guard C-130 aircraft. In the photograph, seen on right, two bales of the marijuana were visible on the fantail.

Captain Lopera, guided by Perka, headed the ship west, then north, staying several hundred miles off the U.S. coast. During the voyage to Alaska the ship encountered engine problems due to contaminated fuel and overheating generators. The navigation devices also malfunctioned, but Perka's navy training allowed him to use celestial navigation. Engineer Hines later testified that an overhaul recently completed in Mexico was improperly done. He stated that first one engine failed, then the other (two engines turned a generator which powered the electric motor driving the propeller), leaving the ship without power and in darkness. Hines managed to get one engine restarted.

=== Preparations ===
In Seattle, agents watched Paul Nelson and Roy Thompson as they parked the motorhome on a hill, erected a long antenna, and made contact with Samarkanda. Nelson then headed north in Whitecap with William Butler at the helm and Jaime Marin-Jaramillo as a passenger. The narcotics agents followed them to Port Angeles, Washington, then to Neah Bay at Cape Flattery. In the darkness north of Neah Bay, contact with Whitecap was lost. Roy Thompson drove the motorhome to the highest point in Puget Sound, Mount Constitution on Orcas Island.

The U.S. agents notified the Royal Canadian Mounted Police which launched an air reconnaissance of the coast of Vancouver Island. The Mounties spotted Whitecap and followed it into Sydney Inlet north of Flores Island, a spot already proven popular with smugglers. The Mounties then fielded an elaborate surveillance of the area using a fishing boat, mountain top observation posts, and periodic flyovers. Marked police boats hid in secluded waters nearby. The Mounties watched Whitecap and its crew for five days.

=== Sydney Inlet ===
Captain Lopera testified that as the weather worsened he worried about the safety of his ship and cargo. On May 21, 1979, he decided to head for the Canadian coastline to let the contaminants in the diesel fuel settle out and fix any damage. Lopera and Samarkanda sailed into Sydney Inlet where Whitecap fired a flare and guided Samarkanda into a small unnamed bay there.

That same afternoon, the RCMP aircraft with a U.S. agent aboard, spotted Samarkanda off the coast. The Mounties watched the mother ship sail into Sydney Inlet. A call went the Canadian Forces which dispatched the destroyer HMCS Qu'Appelle. RCMP maritime and aviation assets began to assemble.

As the tide ebbed in the night, Samarkanda ran aground on rocks and began to list. Fearing that the boat might capsize, Captain Lopera ordered his men to unload the cargo of bales containing marijuana.

=== Raid ===
At dawn, the RCMP was poised to move in and the members were stunned to see that Samarkanda was heeled over on its side. RCMP boats charged into the tiny bay, sirens and loudspeakers blazing. The smugglers fled into the bush. Within a few hours, 21 men were arrested including three Americans. Missing were William Perka and Paul Nelson. U.S. agents arrested Roy Thompson on Mount Constitution in Washington where he had established a radio station for the enterprise.

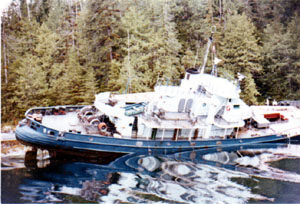
Samarkanda at Sydney Inlet, Vancouver Island, May 22, 1979

As the tide came back in, Samarkanda refloated itself, none the worse for wear. A prize crew from HMCS Qu'Appelle boarded and got engines started. Once the cargo of 634 bales was reloaded, Qu'Appelle escorted Samarkanda back to Victoria, British Columbia.

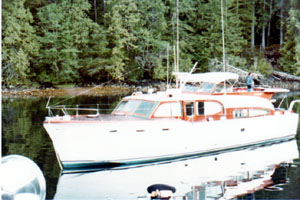
Whitecap in Sydney Inlet, Vancouver Island, May 22, 1979

Perka and Nelson remained at large in the uninhabited wilderness of Vancouver Island relying on Perka's navy survival skills. All they found to eat was a frog and ferns. After eight days, they surrendered to an RCMP patrol boat which was waiting for them.

=== Queen's Bench ===
At trial the following year, the crewmen were dismissed from the case at the close of the Crown's case. They returned to their countries of residence. Captain Lopera and the Americans remained in the prisoners' dock and Perka, Nelson, Hines, and Lopera testified. Perka admitted to other voyages on Samarkanda "strictly legal", but he refused to elaborate. Nelson admitted that he intended to import the marijuana to Alaska, not Canada. He refused to identify his customers or other details. Captain Lopera and Hines explained their engine problems.

The defendants' lawyers argued a defence of necessity. They did not intend to land in Canada and international law allowed them to land to save their lives. An expert defense witness testified that it was vital that they land on shore and would have sunk otherwise.

The Crown did not challenge the expert witness's credentials nor attempt to refute the mechanical condition of Samarkanda. The Crown argued that the defendants were arrested while moving supplies onto shore which expressed an intention to stay in Canada. The remaining defendants were acquitted by the jury on June 10, 1980.

== Judgment of the Court ==
Justice Dickson, writing for the majority, held that a new trial was necessary because the trial judge had incorrectly charged the jury on the defence of necessity. The trial judge had instructed them to consider if the crew's situation was so dire that a reasonable doubt was raised as to whether or not their decision to land in Canada was justified. This set the bar too low. The defence, Dickson described, was a rare exception that would only be allowed when there was clear "involuntariness" where the accused was "strictly controlled and scrupulously limited".

In order for an accused to successfully argue a defence of necessity they must establish three points. First, there is the requirement of imminent peril or danger. Second, the accused must have had no reasonable legal alternative to the course of action he or she undertook. Third, there must be proportionality between the harm inflicted and the harm avoided.

== Aftermath ==
Of all the men arrested in the Samarkanda case, only Jaime Marin was ever charged in the U.S. and that was in connection with another run by Samarkanda. He was convicted in an unrelated case, but never in connection with these cases. Jaime deJesus Cordoba-Vargas was murdered by a girlfriend in Cali in 1982.

William Perka was arrested in the U.S. in April 1987 on an extradition warrant from Canada after his acquittal was overturned.

The Perka test was later elaborated on in cases such as R. v. Latimer.

== Sources ==
- Whitely, Peyton (May 26, 1979). "B.C. Pot Seizure Capped Long Investigation Here". The Seattle Times. p. A-5.
- Whitely, Peyton (April 24, 1987). "Extradition Order Stirs Up Old Drug Smuggling Case". The Seattle Times. p. E-1.
- Regina v. William Francis Perka, et al. Provincial Court of British Columbia, Victoria, British Columbia.
- "Paul Oscar Nelson" (investigative file). Drug Enforcement Administration. RE-79-0055.
