= Shadow defense =

Legal defense tactic

A shadow defense is a legal defense that cannot be sustained on its own merits but opens the door to introducing evidence that will assist in seeking jury nullification, and gives the jury an excuse to acquit. A "shadow defense" also may refer to a tactic by defending counsel that is not expected to be successful as a matter of law; it is, instead, a pretext for bringing information into the court that would otherwise be irrelevant and therefore inadmissible.

An insanity defense might be used to present evidence about a person's troubled childhood, for instance, or a defendant might claim self-defense or duress in order to present evidence about an abusive relationship that nonetheless did not present an imminent danger to the defendant.

An entrapment defense opens the door to presenting evidence about the behavior of police and informants.

It is reversible error for a trial court to refuse a jury instruction on a theory of defense after a defendant makes a threshold showing as to each element of the defense.

== See also ==
- Criminal defense lawyer
