= Competing harms =

Legal doctrine

Competing harms, also known as necessity defense, self-defense defense, or lesser harm, is a legal doctrine in certain U.S. states, particularly in New England. For example, the Maine Criminal Code holds that "Conduct that the person believes to be necessary to avoid imminent physical harm to that person or another is justifiable if the desirability and urgency of avoiding such harm outweigh, according to ordinary standards of reasonableness, the harm sought to be prevented by the statute defining the crime charged. The desirability and urgency of such conduct may not rest upon considerations pertaining to the morality and advisability of such statute." New Hampshire has a similar statute. The competing harms defense was unsuccessfully raised in the trial of Carter Wentworth for his role in the Clamshell Alliance's 1977 occupation of the Seabrook Station Nuclear Power Plant.

== See also ==
- Necessity (criminal law)
