= R v Latimer =

- Supreme Court of Canada

Hearing: June 14, 2000 Judgment: January 18, 2001
- Full case name: Robert William Latimer v Her Majesty The Queen
- Citations: [2001] 1 SCR 3; 2001 SCC 1; (2001), 193 DLR (4th) 577; [2001] 6 WWR 409; (2001), 150 CCC (3d) 129; (2001), 39 CR (5th) 1; (2001), 80 CRR (2d) 189; (2001), 203 Sask R 1
- Prior history: Judgment for the Crown in the Court of Appeal for Saskatchewan
- Ruling: Conviction and prison sentence upheld

Holding
- The life sentence with no parole for ten years did not amount to cruel and unusual punishment under the Canadian Charter of Rights and Freedoms; the fairness of the trial was not compromised by the lateness of the decision on whether the jury could consider the defence of necessity.

Court membership
- Chief Justice: Beverley McLachlin; Puisne Justices: Claire L'Heureux-Dubé, Charles Gonthier, Frank Iacobucci, John C. Major, Michel Bastarache, Ian Binnie, Louise Arbour, Louis LeBel

Reasons given
- Unanimous reasons by: The Court
- Bastarache and LeBel took no part in the consideration or decision of the case.

R v Latimer, [2001] 1 SCR 3 was a decision by the Supreme Court of Canada in the controversial case of Robert Latimer, a Saskatchewan farmer convicted of murdering his disabled daughter, Tracy Latimer. The case sparked an intense national debate as to the ethics of what was claimed as a mercy killing. In its decision, the Supreme Court ruled that the crime could not be justified through the defence of necessity and found that, despite the special circumstances of the case, the lengthy prison sentence given to Latimer was not cruel and unusual and therefore not a breach of section 12 of the Canadian Charter of Rights and Freedoms. The court also ruled that Latimer was not denied rights to jury nullification, as no such rights exist. The prison sentence was thus upheld, although the court specifically noted that the federal government had the power to pardon him.

== Background ==
The Supreme Court described the background this way: Robert Latimer's daughter, Tracy Latimer, was 12 years old and had cerebral palsy. As a result, she was quadriplegic, could not speak, and had the mental abilities of an infant. However, she was not dying of her disability. It was also believed that a feeding tube could help her health, but her parents believed such a medical device would be "intrusive". Thus, numerous surgeries were performed, and after the scheduling of another surgery in 1993, her father, who viewed the upcoming operation as also being cruel, "formed the view that his daughter's life was not worth living". He proceeded to poison her with carbon monoxide. When the police made the discovery, Latimer denied responsibility but later admitted he had killed her. He was convicted of second-degree murder, but in R v Latimer (1997), the Supreme Court overturned that finding due to the Crown's improper actions at the jury selection stage.

In the subsequent second trial, Latimer was again convicted of second-degree murder, but the trial judge declined to sentence him to life imprisonment without eligibility for parole for ten years, the sentence set out in the Criminal Code. The trial judge held that on the facts of the particular case, that sentence would be cruel and unusual, contrary to s. 12 of the Charter. He instead sentenced Latimer to one year of imprisonment, followed by a year on parole. On appeal, the Saskatchewan Court of Appeal set aside the sentence imposed by the trial judge and sentenced Latimer to life imprisonment, with no eligibility for parole for ten years. Latimer then appealed the case to the Supreme Court, arguing not only that the sentence was too long, but also that the trial was unfair because the judge decided the defence of necessity could not be argued even though this decision only came after the defence had argued it. It was also claimed the judge had misled the jury into thinking that they could influence the length of the sentence. Since many in the jury wished for a lighter sentence than that prescribed by the Criminal Code, it was argued the jury might have resorted to jury nullification had they known they could not decide the length of the sentence.

== Decision ==
The decision upholding the life sentence with no parole eligibility for ten years was unanimous and was written by the court.

=== Defence of necessity ===
The court first held that not only was the defence of necessity unable to justify Latimer's actions but also the inapplicability of the defence should have been so obvious that his lawyers should have anticipated its rejection, and therefore, the fact that the judge rejected it only after the defence was argued was not unfair. The court first cited precedent that the defence of necessity is invoked only where "true 'involuntariness' is present". This involves being confronted with serious danger, having no other options but to commit a crime to avoid that danger, and "proportionality between the harm inflicted and the harm avoided." While the court acknowledged that the individual's subjective views in measuring approaching dangers and other options could be taken into account, along with an objective assessment (this was called a "modified objective test"), in this case, the defence of necessity failed. First, the claimed danger being avoided, the surgery, threatened not Mr Latimer but his daughter. Moreover, the court wrote that "ongoing pain did not constitute an emergency in this case". The court believed Mr Latimer should have been able to understand this, especially since there were alternatives to surgery, such as the feeding tube. The court went on to find that Latimer had other alternatives to killing his daughter, namely that "he could have struggled on", albeit "with what was unquestionably a difficult situation".

The court also ruled that subjective views could not influence an assessment of whether the crime is worse, equal or lesser than the threatened danger to the criminal since "fundamental principles of the criminal law" would be sacrificed. In this case, the rights of the disabled, based on section 15 of the Charter, were considered to be the important factor in considering how serious the crime was. The court had difficulties in deciding whether any emergency could justify homicide, and at any rate, found Tracy's death was worse than the pain Tracy might have felt during life.

=== Jury nullification ===
The court went on to reject the argument that the trial was unfair because the chances of jury nullification were impaired by the judge. As the court argued, there is no right to a trial in which one's chances of jury nullification are not impaired. Indeed, the justice system is not supposed to advocate jury nullification. Moreover, the judge's apparent suggestion that the jury might have some influence in determining the sentence was not considered misleading or unfair because, while juries cannot decide sentences, they can indeed make recommendations.

=== Section 12 ===
Finally, the court rejected the argument that the ten-year parole ineligibility might be so long as to be cruel and unusual and thus unconstitutional under section 12 of the Charter. Since a section 12 test demands consideration of the seriousness of the crime, the court pointed out that the crime led to the "most serious of all possible consequences, namely, the death of the victim, Tracy Latimer". Consideration of the mens rea of the offence, therefore, guided the court to conclude that even though Latimer had been convicted of second-degree murder as opposed to first-degree murder, "second-degree murder is an offence accompanied by an extremely high degree of criminal culpability".

At this point, the court, in balancing other factors in the case, namely how Mr Latimer had planned his crime and did not regret it, and conversely, how he was distressed over Tracy's condition and was otherwise respected, did not find that any of the positive factors outweighed the crime. Moreover, the court also considered the punishment valid because it might discourage others from taking similar actions.

== See also ==
- List of Supreme Court of Canada cases (McLachlin Court)
