= Winooski 44 =

American political protest group

The Winooski 44 were a group of Vermont citizens in the United States who were given permission by the Senator's staff to occupy a hallway outside Senator Robert Stafford's office in March 1984.

The group of citizens had attempted, for months, to organize a public forum, in Burlington, and invited Senator Stafford to be present. They all had personal experiences in Central America, which they wanted to share with the Senator, a leading Republican, and his Vermont constituency. The group wanted to influence Senator Stafford so he would change his vote, and instead vote against the US Government's policy of selling arms to Nicaraguan contras. The sit-in lasted for three days in March 1984. Twenty-six were tried on trespassing charges in November 1984, and were permitted to present a "necessity" defense, and all were acquitted.

Witnesses for the defense included historian and activist Howard Zinn and former Attorney General Ramsey Clark.

== See also ==
- Iran–Contra affair
- Politics of Vermont
