= January 20, 2005, counter-inaugural protest =

Protest in Washington D.C. and other American cities

January 20, 2005 counter-inaugural protest
- Part of Women's Rights Movement
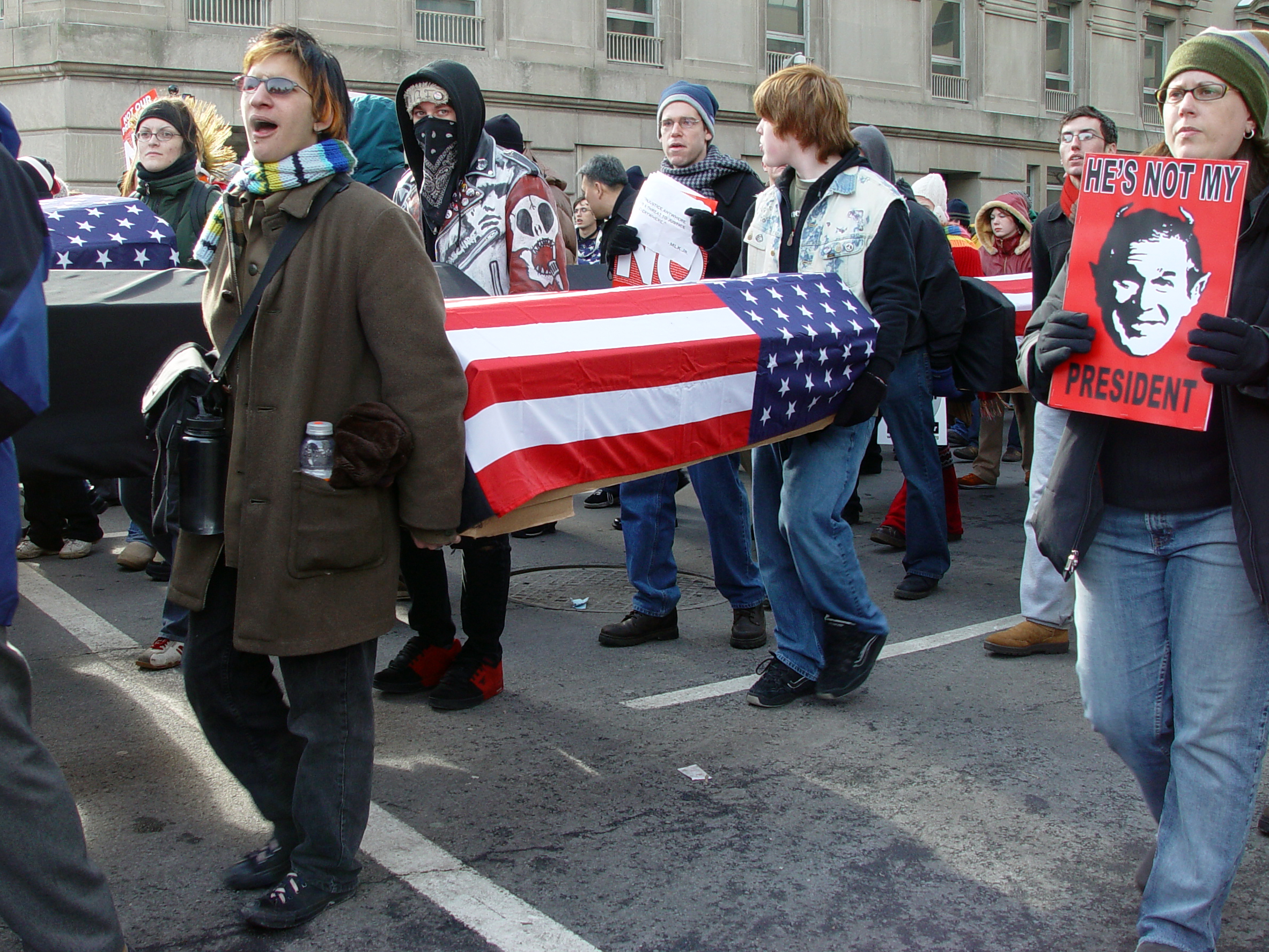
- Anti-war protesters carrying coffins at the counter-inaugural protest in Washington, D.C.
- Date: January 20, 2005
- Location: Washington, D.C.
- Caused by: Anti-war

Parties
| DC Anti-War Network | Police |

On January 20, 2005, a number of counter-inaugural demonstrations were held in Washington, D.C., and other American cities to protest the second inauguration of President George W. Bush.

In other American cities: Groups and protesters in cities such as Philadelphia, Las Vegas, New Orleans, Milwaukee, Santa Cruz and others organized demonstrations against the inauguration ceremony. These demonstrations were part of anti-war and anti-government movements, and included protests against the continuation of the Iraq War, calls for social justice, and opposition to Bush's domestic and foreign policies.

== Rally at Malcolm X Park ==
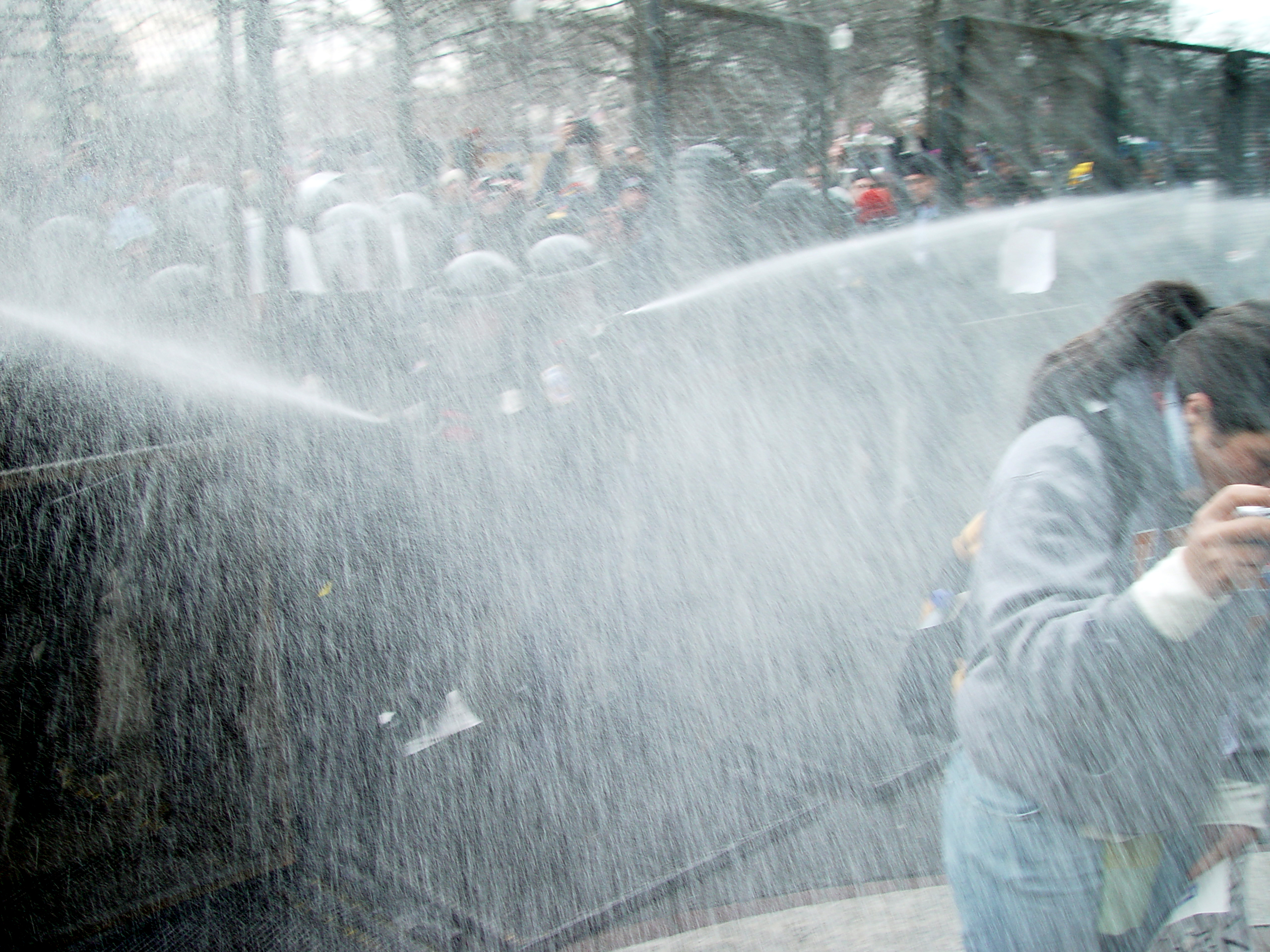
Police pepper spraying protesters at Bush's 2nd inauguration, Washington, D.C.

The DC Anti-War Network (DAWN) sponsored a mass rally and march at Malcolm X Park (Meridian Hill Park) to protest the inauguration of President George W. Bush. Following a number of speeches, the group marched south on 16th Street NW and east on H Street NW to McPherson Square.

Speakers included:

- Amy Goodman – Democracy Now
- Father Gérard Jean-Juste – Former Haitian political prisoner
- Reverend Graylan Hagler – Civil rights leader, Plymouth Congregational Church
- Stan Goff – Military Families Speak Out
- Shujaa Graham – Exonerated death row inmate
- Medea Benjamin – Code Pink, Global Exchange
- Michael Ratner – International Human Rights lawyer, Center for Constitutional Rights
- David Cobb – 2004 Green Party presidential candidate
- Zach Lown – International Socialist Organization
- Aidan Delgado – Iraq War veteran
- Andy Shallal – Iraqi-American activist
- Mark Lance – Palestinian rights activist
- Ellen Thomas – Anti-nuclear activist
- David Rovics – Folk singer
- Son Of Nun – Political rapper

=== Die-in ===
A separate-but-related event, also sponsored by DAWN, was a civil disobedience die-in. Waiting thirty minutes after the last participants in the main march had left Malcolm X Park, a smaller group marched from Malcolm X Park to Lafayette Square. There, a security perimeter inhibited further southbound progress. With the intention of being quickly arrested, 17 people laid down on the street in front of Lafayette Square. Police did not arrest the die-in participants, leaving them to lie on the street for three and a half hours until they left on their own.

=== Protest Warrior confrontation ===
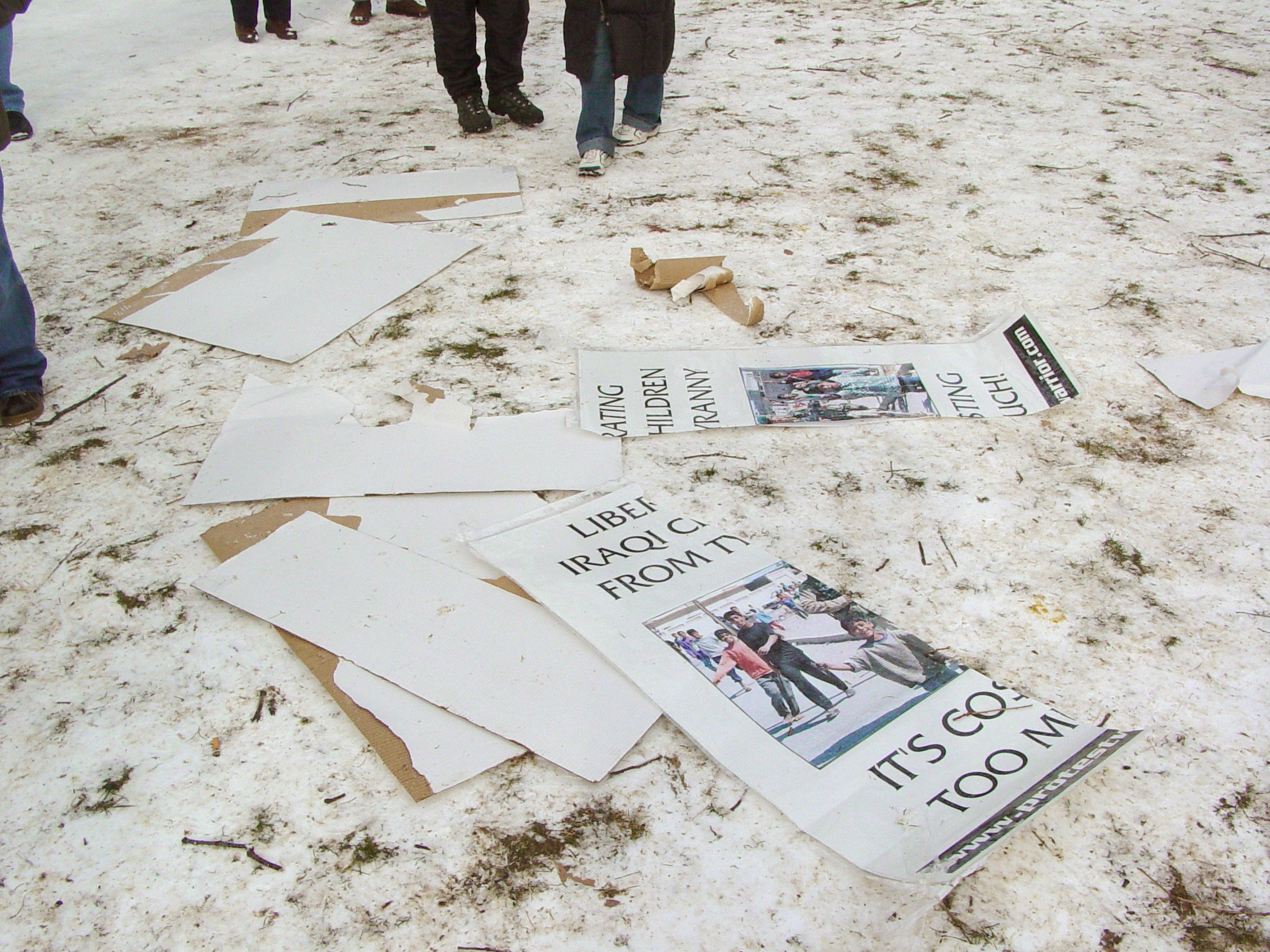
Protest Warrior signs lay on the ground after having been destroyed during the confrontation.

During the rally at Malcolm X Park, members of the Protest Warrior group, several rally participants, and DAWN marshals got into a confrontation. According to Indymedia sources, "Toward the end of the rally, when there were at least 10,000 people in the park, a Protest Warrior led a few 20-something conservative college kids into, (in their own words) 'the belly of the beast' to systematically seek out 'black-block' anarchists among the mass of peaceful demonstrators and flaunt their pro-Bush war signs in order to instigate a conflict."

Several activists assaulted Gil Kobrin, leader of the Protest Warrior contingent at the protest. According to Kobrin, "A heavy-set black man in a trench coat patted his left lapel, muttering something about a pipe. When he saw that we weren't leaving, he made a grab for one of our signs. I stepped in to get between him and the Protest Warrior, and was tripped by one of the anarchists. At that moment, all hell broke loose... As I struggled to get up in the slippery snow, two anarchists began kicking me in the back; Protest Warriors were being shoved and punched all around me." It appears that there is no evidence to support the claim that Protest Warrior "sought out" a particular faction within the DAWN rally. The fact that DAWN marshals agreed to allow the Protest Warriors to stay prior to the violent outbreak appears to indicate that Protest Warriors' presence was not apparently provocative; in Kobrin's recollection, "I remembered [incidents at] the RNC, and was not looking forward to a repeat of the violence there."

Mitch Potts, one of the DAWN marshals, attempted to mediate the conflict and seek a peaceful resolution. Another DAWN marshal told the Protest Warriors that DAWN had a permit to peacefully assemble in the park, and that the Protest Warriors could not stay if they were going to disrupt that peace. Potts then offered to safely escort the Protest Warriors out of the park, and arranged a place for them on 16th Street along the march route.

=== Black Bloc breakaway march ===
At 16th and P Streets NW, a group of roughly 1,000 people separated from the main march. The group primarily consisted of participants in the black bloc, but also contained "drummers, radical cheerleaders, and belly dancers". This group marched through the streets, ending up at the security checkpoint set up at 7th and D Streets NW. Here, the police and the demonstrators got into a conflict, and the police pepper sprayed and beat several demonstrators.

== Parade route ==
ANSWER Coalition had secured a permit for a protest along the Parade Route, to be held at 4th Street and Pennsylvania Avenue NW. Due to security procedures in place, signs could only be made of cardboard, posterboard, or cloth, and could be no larger than three feet by 20 feet, and one quarter inch thickness. According to the ANSWER Coalition, over 10,000 antiwar protested at A.N.S.W.E.R. Mass Convergence site on Inaugural Parade route between 3rd & 4th St. on Pennsylvania Ave. Thousands of other protesters were blocked at Secret Service Checkpoints.

== Critical Mass at Dupont Circle ==
At 4:00 PM, all who had participated in other demonstrations earlier in the day were invited to Dupont Circle for a "Mass Re-meet" at Dupont Circle. Hot food and drinks were provided for participants. A Critical Mass bicycle ride started here at the same time, and in addition, a group marched back into downtown Washington DC from here. The Black Bloc made a good showing here as well, congregating near the center of the circle. Police, who arrived after the event had already begun, parked their motorcycles across the street from Dupont Circle. Additionally, a number of people remained at Dupont Circle for some time after the Critical Mass riders had left, and after the marchers left.

== Demonstrations outside inaugural balls ==
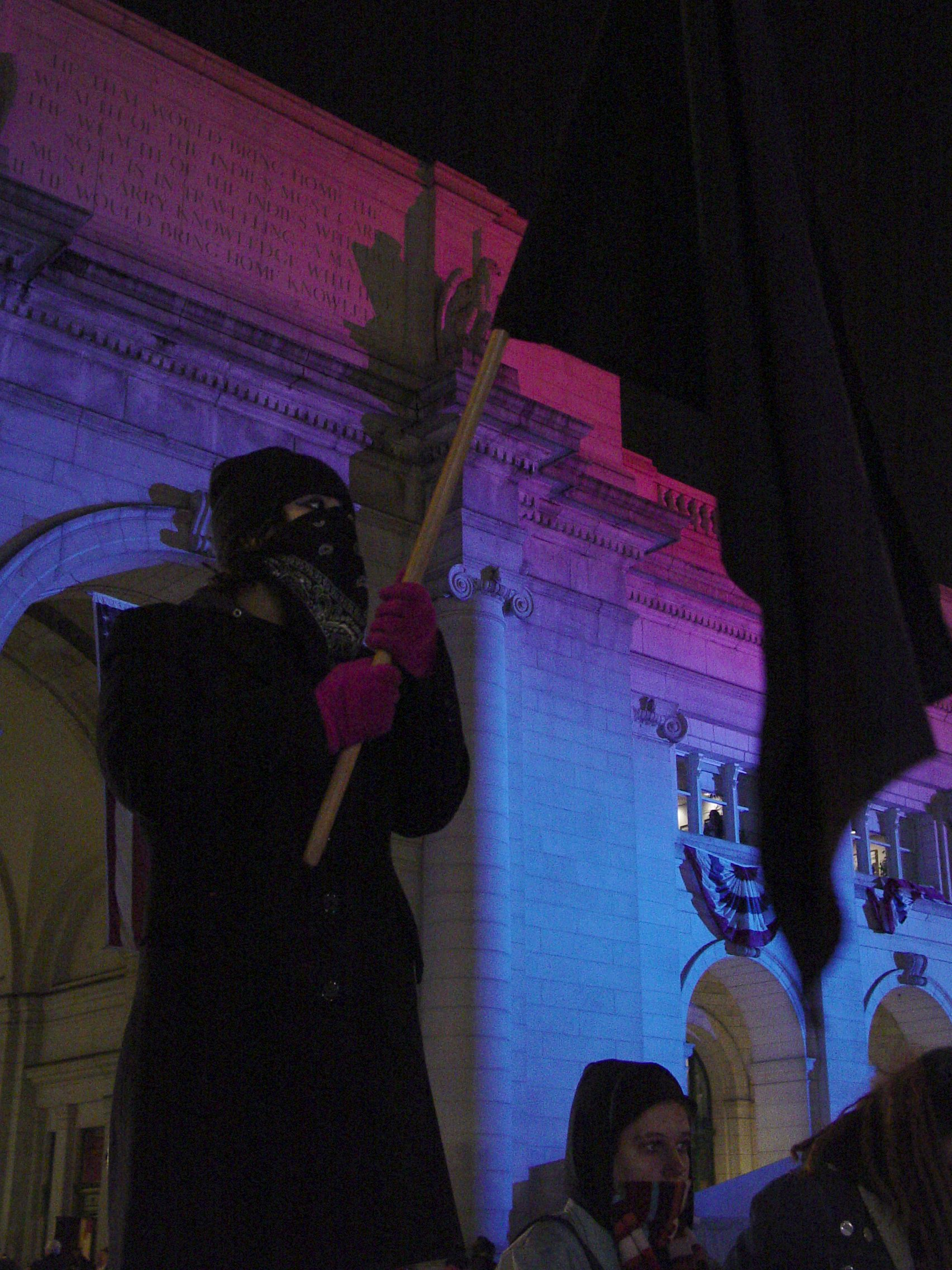
A masked woman holds a black flag in front of Union Station, site of the Freedom Ball.

As daylight turned into evening, the official inaugural celebrations were convening at the Washington Convention Center, the Marriott Wardman Park Hotel, the Washington Hilton, the National Building Museum, and Union Station.

Outside Union Station, where the Freedom Ball was being held, a group organized by Code Pink was outside demonstrating. The group outside Union Station was composed of many individuals seen at other counter-inaugural events earlier in the day, and the mood was initially festive. As participants in the inaugural balls arrived to enter, demonstrators would chant, "SHAME! SHAME! SHAME!" at them. Some demonstrators also shouted, "TOGA! TOGA!" at some of the participants, poking fun at the movie Animal House. There were several confrontations between ball participants and demonstrators, including one where a demonstrator and a participant got into a fight. In the end, the ball participant was admitted to the event, and the demonstrator was detained but was not arrested and let go minutes later.

== March through Adams Morgan neighborhood ==
Following the counter-inaugural ball, a group marched through the Adams Morgan neighborhood in Washington in an impromptu protest headed for one of the inaugural ball sites at the Washington Hilton Hotel. A few of the marchers wore masks and carried torches. A handful spray-painted buildings with the anarchist symbol and broke windows of a police car and a bank. A police roadblock directed the group into a maze of alleys where officers rounded up about six dozen marchers who were not engaged in vandalism; they were pepper-sprayed, detained, and jailed overnight. Charges were later dropped. A police report described the event. Lawyers from the ACLU and the law firms Gaffney & Schember and Kirkland & Ellis represented the group in a class-action lawsuit filed against the District of Columbia. On August 1, 2011, Judge Ellen Huvelle of the United States District Court for the District of Columbia gave final approval for a settlement in which the District of Columbia agreed to pay $250,000 and expunge the arrest records of a class of about 70 people.

== Other items ==
In Washington and around the inaugural parade route: Thousands of protesters gathered in parks, along the parade route and around Pennsylvania Avenue, carrying symbolic flags, cardboard coffins and anti-war and anti-government slogans, expressing their protest against Bush's policies.

== See also ==
- A.N.S.W.E.R.
- Black bloc
- Code Pink
- Inauguration Day
- List of rallies and protest marches in Washington, D.C.
- Protest Warrior
- Protests against the 2003 Iraq war
- Turn Your Back on Bush
