= Project Censored the Movie =

Project Censored the Movie: Ending The Reign of Junkfood News
- Directed by: Chris Oscar; Doug Hecker
- Written by: Chris Oscar; Doug Hecker
- Produced by: Chris Oscar; Doug Hecker
- Starring: Oliver Stone; Phil Donahue; Noam Chomsky; Michael Parenti
- Cinematography: Dan Shimer; Mike Fischer
- Edited by: Mike Fischer
- Release date: April 12, 2013 (Sonoma, California)
- Running time: 60 minutes
- Country: United States
- Language: English

Project Censored the Movie: Ending The Reign of Junkfood News is a 2013 documentary film about the news media in the United States written and directed by Christopher Oscar and Doug Hecker. The film is based on the work by Project Censored, a media organization at Sonoma State University that publishes under-reported news stories. It was released in April 2013 at the Sonoma International Film Festival and won the award for Most Viewed Film.

== Featuring ==
- Noam Chomsky
- Howard Zinn
- Michael Parenti
- Greg Palast
- Oliver Stone
- Daniel Ellsberg
- Peter Kuznick
- Cynthia McKinney
- Nora Barrows-Friedman
- John Perkins
- Jonah Raskin
- Khalil Bendib
- Abby Martin
- Carl Jensen
- Peter Phillips
- Mickey Huff
- Andy Lee Roth
- Kevin Danaher
