= Abby Martin =

American journalist and activist (born 1984/1985)

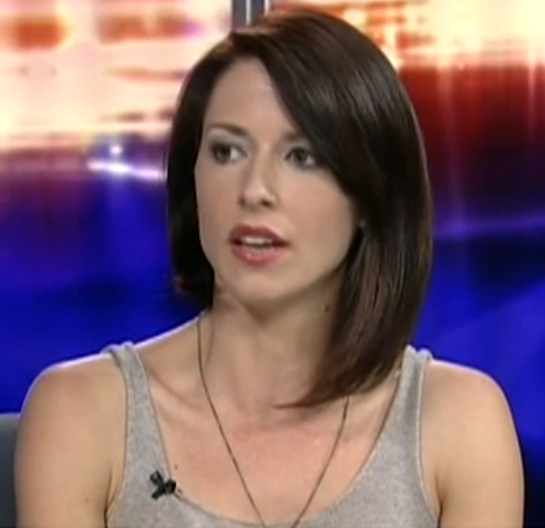
- Martin in 2012
- Born: 1984 or 1985 (age 41–42); Oakland, California, U.S.
- Education: Amador Valley High School; San Diego State University (BA)
- Occupations: Journalist; activist; artist; director; author
- Known for: Media Roots; Breaking The Set (RT America); Project Censored; The Empire Files (Telesur English); News Beat (AMBS-TV)
- Spouse: Mike Prysner

Abby Martin (born 1984 or 1985) is an American journalist, television presenter, and activist. She helped found the citizen journalism website Media Roots and serves on the board of directors for the Media Freedom Foundation which manages Project Censored. Martin appeared in the documentary film Project Censored The Movie: Ending the Reign of Junk Food News (2013), and co-directed 99%: The Occupy Wall Street Collaborative Film (2013).

Martin hosted Breaking the Set on the Russian state-funded network RT America from 2012 to 2015, leaving after condemning on-air the Russian annexation of Crimea. She then launched The Empire Files in that same year as an investigative documentary and interview series on Telesur, later released as a web series. In 2019, she released the film documentary The Empire Files: Gaza Fights for Freedom.

== Early life ==
Born in Oakland, California, Martin grew up in nearby Pleasanton, where she attended Amador Valley High School, graduating in 2002. She became interested in journalism when her old high school boyfriend enlisted in the military after the September 11 attacks in 2001. "I didn't want him going to war, let alone fighting in one," she recalls. "I began to critically ask 'What is really going on?'" By the time she was a sophomore at San Diego State University, she began questioning what she called the "selling" of the Iraq War by the media. She received an undergraduate degree in political science and minored in Spanish.

In 2004, she campaigned for John Kerry's presidential campaign, but became disillusioned with the left–right paradigm, a concept proposing that societies have a tendency to divide themselves into ideological opposites. Martin worked for a time as an investigative journalist for a San Diego-based online news site until moving back to Northern California.

== 9/11 truth movement ==
In 2008, Martin was active in the 9/11 truth movement, a movement which disputes the consensus regarding the attacks of September 11, 2001. Martin set up her own "truther" group in San Diego, California. That year, Martin said that the attacks of September 11 were "an inside job, and that our government was complicit in what happened". In March 2014, the Associated Press wrote that Martin no longer believes that U.S. government officials might have been complicit in the Sep 11 terrorist attacks.

== Media Roots ==
In 2009, Martin founded the organization Media Roots, a citizen journalism platform for reporting news. As an independent journalist with Media Roots, Martin covered the Occupy Oakland actions during the Occupy Wall Street movement in 2011. Her documentary video footage of Occupy Oakland protests was used by the family of Scott Olsen, a 24-year-old former Marine and Iraq War veteran, in a lawsuit against the Oakland Police Department. Martin's footage was used to argue that the protests were non-violent at the time Olsen was allegedly hit in the head with a police projectile. RT took notice of Martin's work and began employing her as a correspondent. In the fall of 2010, she moved to Washington, D.C.

== Breaking the Set and work for RT ==
From 2012 to 2015, Martin hosted her own show, Breaking the Set, on RT America. The program described itself as "a show that cuts through the false left/right paradigm set by the establishment and reports the hard facts". The original opening credits depict Martin applying a sledgehammer to a television tuned to CNN.

Shortly after beginning her show on RT, Martin stated in an interview with media studies professor Mark Crispin Miller that "the media dismisses things that are too controversial as conspiracy theory".

In 2014, Martin gained attention for her criticism of RT's coverage of the annexation of Crimea by the Russian Federation. Martin closed her show on March 3, 2014, with a minute-long statement condemning the Russian military intervention in Ukraine. Glenn Greenwald compared Martin's statement favorably to the unquestioning behavior of the United States media during the 2003 invasion of Iraq. Critics of Martin argue that she appeared to be reading from a teleprompter, implying that her remarks were made with the consent of the show's producers. RT issued a statement saying: "Contrary to the popular opinion, RT doesn't beat its journalists into submission, and they are free to express their own opinions, not just in private but on the air." RT added: "[W]e'll be sending her to Crimea to give her an opportunity to make up her own mind from the epicentre of the story." Martin declined the offer, saying, "I am not going to Crimea despite the statement RT has made." The New York Times wrote that RT notified Martin that what she had said about Ukraine was "not in line with our editorial policy".

Martin left RT in February 2015. An RT spokesperson told BuzzFeed: "Abby decided that this is the time for her to try something new. We are proud of the great work she has done as the host of Breaking the Set."

Martin called the charges of foreign control over her and Tulsi Gabbard "neo-McCarthyist hysteria" typical of the New Cold War. She said that the "campaign to malign RT" by "the corporate media" had resulted in a chilling effect over legitimate dissident reporters. She said that she had "complete editorial control" over her RT show, as did other American RT journalists like Chris Hedges and Lee Camp. She had earlier refused RT's offer to send her on a tour of Crimea, saying she didn't want a "vetted PR experience."

Millennial Magazine has described Martin as an outspoken media representative for the Millennial generation who reports "stories that deserve public recognition". Journalist Glenn Greenwald praised Martin for condemning the Russian invasion of Crimea during an episode of her RT program Breaking the Set, saying Martin demonstrated "journalistic independence".

== The Empire Files ==
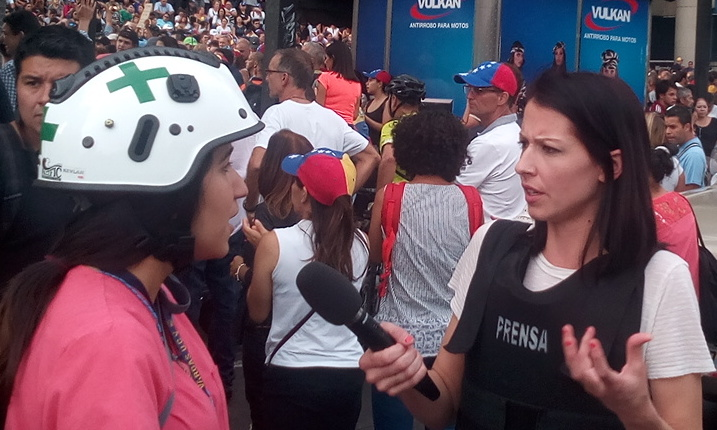
Abby Martin interviewing a member of the Green Cross during the 2017 Venezuelan protests

In September 2015, Martin launched The Empire Files, an interview and documentary series. She has hosted guests including Chris Hedges, Noam Chomsky, Richard D. Wolff, Ralph Nader and Jill Stein.

The show was originally hosted by Telesur English, a media outlet sponsored primarily by the government of Venezuela. Martin told Ben Norton writing for AlterNet: "The show is totally independent of Telesur. We merely sell them the content; they have zero control over anything we do". In 2018, Telesur stopped funding The Empire Files due to increasing US sanctions on Venezuela, according to a press release published by Martin's Media Roots website. Martin, her co-producer and husband Michael Prysner, and other Telesur contract journalists had their funding blocked by the application of United States sanctions against Venezuela. Academic Stuart Davis cites the cancellation as an example of how United States sanctions hamper public funding of media production in Venezuela.

In August 2018 the show moved to a donation model in order to continue production. The show has since become a web series exclusively, with episodes being uploaded to Martin's website, YouTube and Vimeo. Released in May 2019, her feature film documentary, The Empire Files: Gaza Fights for Freedom, concerns the Gaza–Israel conflict. It was shown in the US, UK and Australia at independent theatres. In May 2021, Martin released the film for free on YouTube.

Martin was interviewed and featured in the award-winning documentary feature film Seeds for Liberation (2026) by director Matthew Solomon. The film discusses the Free Palestine movement and references her Empire Files.

== Free speech lawsuit ==
In February 2020, Martin's booking to speak at a conference at Georgia Southern University on Critical Media Literacy was canceled when she refused to sign a pledge not to boycott Israel as required by law in the U.S. state of Georgia. Martin, represented by the Council on American-Islamic Relations, filed a free-speech lawsuit against the State of Georgia. The conference was later canceled.

In May 2021, in a federal court hearing in Georgia, District Judge Mark Cohen ruled in Martin's favor when he found that a law created to discourage the Boycott, Divestment and Sanctions (BDS) movement was in violation of the First Amendment. Judge Cohen ruled that Georgia's law "prohibits inherently expressive conduct protected by the First Amendment."

== Personal life ==
Martin is married to her Empire Files co-producer, Mike Prysner, an Iraq War veteran.

== Selected work ==
=== Film ===
- Project Censored the Movie (2013), as herself
- 99%: The Occupy Wall Street Collaborative Film (2013), co-director
- The Choice Is Ours (2016), as herself
- Gaza Fights for Freedom (2019), director
- Earth's Greatest Enemy (2025), director
- Seeds for Liberation (2026), as herself

=== Book chapters ===
- Martin, Abby (October 4, 2011). "Framing the Messengers: Junk Food News and News Abuse for Dummies". In Huff, Mickey (ed.). Censored 2012: The Top 25 Censored Stories Of 2010-11. New York: Seven Stories Press. ISBN 978-1-60980-358-2.
- Martin, Abby (October 4, 2011). "Media Democracy in Action". In Huff, Mickey (ed.). Censored 2012: The Top 25 Censored Stories Of 2010-11. New York: Seven Stories Press. ISBN 978-1-60980-358-2.
- Martin, Abby (August 1, 2015). "The Unheard Story of Hurricane Katrina, Blackwater, White Militias & Community Empowerment: An interview with Scott Crow and Malik Rahim". In Crow, Scott (ed.). Emergency hearts, Molotov dreams: A Scott Crow reader: Selected interviews & conversations 2010-2015. GTK Press. ISBN 978-0-9965460-0-3. OCLC 933722650. Video of this interview is available from RT.com and ScottCrow.org.
- Martin, Abby (2018). "Foreword: The post-truth dilemma". In Huff, Mickey; Roth, Andy Lee (eds.). Censored 2019: The Top Censored Stories and Media Analysis of 2017-2018. New York City: Seven Stories Press. ISBN 978-1-60980-869-3. ISSN 1074-5998.

=== Radio ===
- Project Censored, KPFA (94.1 FM), co-host
