= Michael Prysner =

American political activist (born 1983)

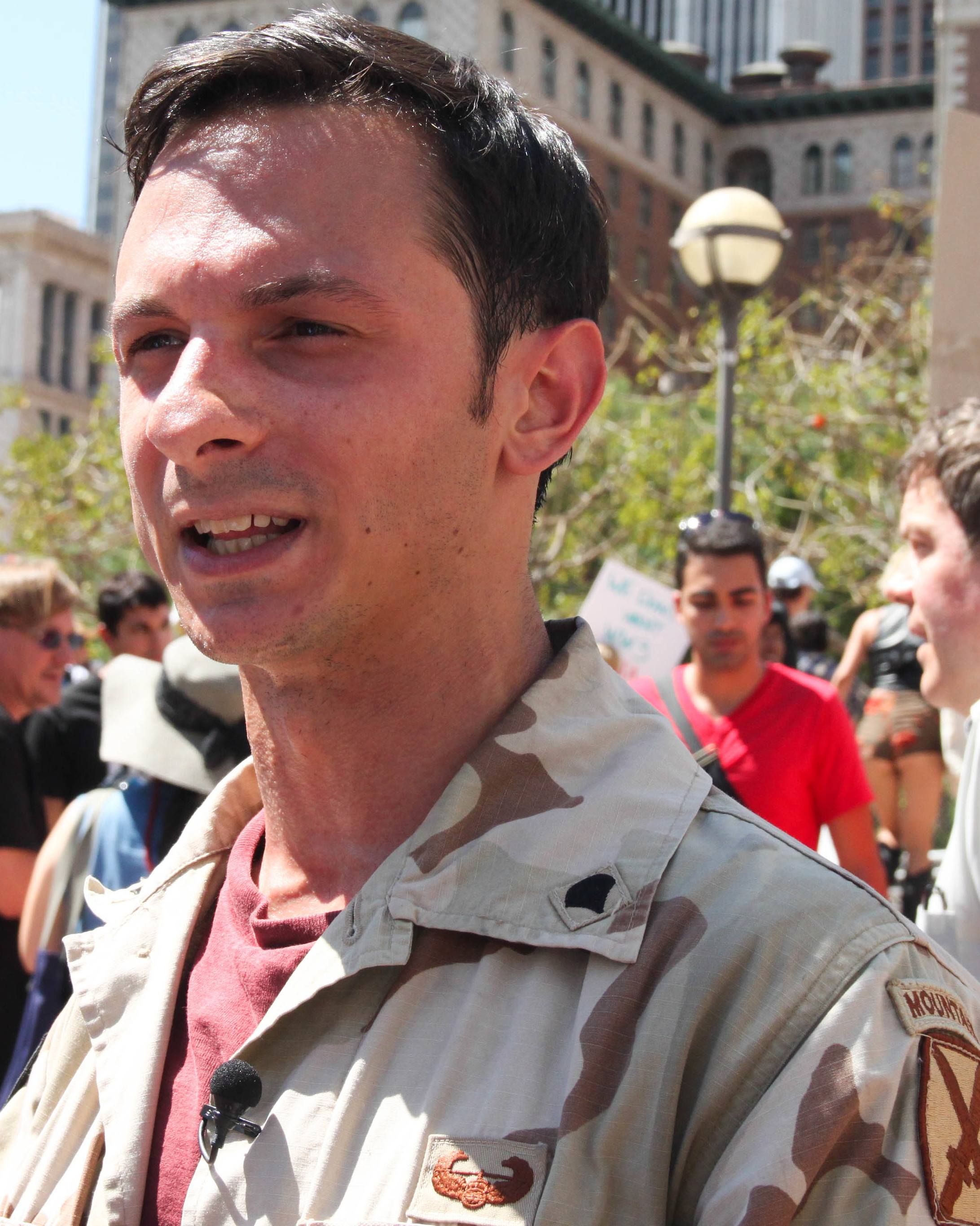
- Prysner in 2013

Personal details
- Born: Michael D. Prysner; June 15, 1983 (age 43)
- Party: Party for Socialism and Liberation (PSL)
- Education: Florida Atlantic University
- Occupation: Political activist
- Television: The Empire Files
- Publication: TeleSur
- Movement: March Forward!
- Spouse: Abby Martin

Military service
- Allegiance: United States
- Branch/service: United States Army
- Years of service: 2001–2005
- Rank: Specialist
- Battles/wars: Iraq War

Michael D. Prysner (born June 15, 1983) is an American socialist activist. He is a U.S. Army veteran who served in Iraq and Syria as a specialist. His duties in Iraq included ground surveillance, home raids, and interrogation of prisoners. According to Prysner, these experiences led him to take an anti-war stance.

== Education and military career ==
Prysner is a graduate of Sickles High School in Tampa, Florida, and Florida Atlantic University.

Prysner joined the U.S. Army in 2001 under the Delayed Entry Program when he was 17 and left the military in 2005. He had basic training at Fort Sill in Lawton, Oklahoma and was assigned to the 10th Mountain Division at Fort Drum in New York. Prysner's company participated in the 2003 invasion of Iraq, and he served there for 12 months. While in the Army Prysner attained the rank of Specialist.

== Activism ==
Prysner is the executive director of the Center on Conscience and War (CCW; as of 2026) and the co-founder of March Forward!, an organization of active-duty members of the U.S. military and veterans of the Iraq and Afghanistan wars that encourages active-duty service personnel to resist deployment and seek an honorable discharge by being a conscientious objector.

In March 2008, Prysner was a member of a panel discussing the topic Winter Soldier: Iraq & Afghanistan in Maryland. Prysner spoke about his time in Iraq as a soldier and his personal views about the two wars.

Prysner is a member of Party for Socialism and Liberation and A.N.S.W.E.R. In 2008, he ran a write-in campaign for the U.S. House of Representatives for Florida's 22nd congressional district.

In November 2011, Prysner was arrested in Occupy Los Angeles. He was released after posting bail.

On September 19, 2021, Prysner interrupted former U.S. President George W. Bush's speech in Beverly Hills, California. Prysner demanded an apology for lying about weapons of mass destruction, connections to 9/11, and causing the deaths of a million Iraqis. He stated "you sent me to Iraq" and "my friends are dead because you lied."

Prysner is on the National Board of Directors for Veterans for Peace.

=== Iran war ===
After the start of the Iran war in February 2026, Prysner reported that the CCW started receiving hundreds of conscientious objector applications from active-duty members of the military—a sharp rise compared to previous years when only about 50 applications were received annually—and that troops were telling the organization that they do not want to be involved in a war that does not align with their values. He cited the Minab school attack as the most popular reason provided by service members for filing their applications.

On April 20, 2026, Prysner was among the dozens of veterans and military family members who were arrested for occupying the Cannon House Office Building while protesting the war. Just before being arrested, he termed the war "deeply unpopular" and "a crisis" for Trump's administration while encouraging conscientious objection among service members.

== Media production ==
Prysner is a producer and co-writer for the program The Empire Files, with his wife Abby Martin. English-language Telesur canceled the show in 2018, and it later moved to a web publishing model. Prysner, Martin, and other Telesur contract journalists had their funding blocked by the application of U.S. sanctions against Venezuela. Academic Stuart Davis cites the cancellation as an example of how United States sanctions hamper public funding of media production in Venezuela.

Prysner performed the rap "Skit 6" on Lowkey's album Soundtrack to the Struggle.

As of 2021, he hosted the Eyes Left podcast with former US Army Cadet and Afghanistan War veteran Spenser Rapone.

== Personal life ==
Prysner is married to journalist Abby Martin; they have two children together.

== See also ==
- The Iraq Solidarity Campaign
