= Hijacking Catastrophe =

- Film poster
- Directed by: Jeremy Earp; Sut Jhally
- Narrated by: Julian Bond
- Release date: 2004
- Running time: 68 minutes
- Country: United States

Hijacking Catastrophe: 9/11, Fear & the Selling of American Empire is a 2004 documentary film narrated by Julian Bond and directed by Jeremy Earp and Sut Jhally. It examines the possibility that neoconservatives used the September 11 attacks to usher in a new doctrine of expanding American power through military force under the guise of a "war on terror" and that the doctrine, known as the Project for the New American Century (PNAC), had been laid out prior to 9/11 by its authors, which include Dick Cheney, Paul Wolfowitz, Donald Rumsfeld, Jeb Bush, and Dan Quayle.

== Summary ==
The film maintains that fear of terrorism was manipulated to support goals which are in step with the PNAC; namely the overthrow of Saddam Hussein. Not just for control of regional strategic resources (natural gas and oil), but to reassert American dominance on the world stage as a warning to potential adversaries. Interviews were conducted with critics such as Noam Chomsky and Nobel Peace Prize laureate Jody Williams. It also interviews policy analysts, military brass, journalists, insider observations from Chief UN Weapons Inspector Scott Ritter and Pentagon whistleblower Lt. Colonel Karen Kwiatkowski.

The historical context of the "Bush Doctrine" is examined and compared to Wolfowitz's PNAC philosophy. The film goes on to look at the "selling of American empire" and the possible economical, social, cultural and political implications it will have in America, and on the world if implemented further during Bush's second term.

== Cast ==
- Tariq Ali
- Benjamin Barber
- Medea Benjamin
- Noam Chomsky
- Kevin Danaher
- Mark Danner
- Shadia Drury
- Michael Dyson
- Daniel Ellsberg
- Michael Franti
- Stan Goff
- William Hartung
- Robert Jensen
- Chalmers Johnson

- Jackson Katz
- Michael T. Klare
- Lt. Col. Karen Kwiatkowski (Ret.)
- Norman Mailer
- Zia Mian
- Mark Crispin Miller
- Scott Ritter
- Vandana Shiva
- Norman Solomon
- Greg Speeter
- Fernando Suarez del Solar
- Immanuel Wallerstein
- Jody Williams
- Max Wolff

== See also ==
- Why We Fight (2005 film)
