= Junk food news =

Sardonic term for trivial news stories

Junk food news, or junk news, is a sardonic term for news stories that deliver "sensationalized, personalized, and homogenized inconsequential trivia", especially when such stories appear at the expense of serious investigative journalism. It implies a criticism of the mass media for disseminating news that, while not very nourishing, is "cheap to produce and profitable for media proprietors."

== Meaning ==
The term junk food news was first used in print by Carl Jensen in the March 1983 edition of Penthouse. As the leader of Project Censored, he had frequently faulted the media for ignoring important stories. In response, says Jensen, editors claimed that other stories were more important, and bolstered this claim with ad hominem comments directed against him.

...news editors and directors...argued that the real issue isn't censorship—but rather a difference of opinion as to what information is important to publish or broadcast. Editors often point out that there is a finite amount of time and space for news delivery—about 23 minutes for a half-hour network television evening news program—and that it's their responsibility to determine which stories are most critical for the public to hear. The critics said I wasn't exploring media censorship but rather I was just another frustrated academic criticizing editorial news judgment.

To give this argument a fair hearing, Jensen decided to conduct a review to determine which stories the media had considered more important. But instead of hard-hitting investigative journalism, what he discovered was the phenomenon that he termed junk food news fell into predictable categories:

- Brand name news (celebrity gossip)
- Sex news (exposés and sexual titillation)
- Yo-yo news (statistics that change daily, such as stock market numbers and box office totals)
- Show business news (movie openings)
- Latest craze news (brief fads)
- Anniversary news (anniversaries of major events or celebrity deaths)
- Sports news (sports rumours)
- Political news (bi-annual coverage of congressional campaign promises)

As the flip side to its annual list of the Top 25 Censored Stories, Project Censored publishes an annual list of the Top 10 Junk Food News stories, compiled by members of the National Organization of News Ombudsmen.

== See also ==
- Fake news – False or misleading information presented as real
- Hot take, also known as Pundit debate and analysis of sports and political news – Immediate opinionated/controversial statement on news events
- Media circus, also known as Media hype – Phrase describing excessive media coverage
- Media culture – Western society shaped by 20th-century media
- Sensationalism – Type of editorial tactic used in mass media
- Soft media, also known as soft news – Organizations focused on producing infotainment
