= Gaza Freedom March =

2009 planned political march in the Gaza Strip

Gaza Freedom March was a plan for a political march, intended to be non-violent, in 2009 to end the blockade of the Gaza Strip. The march planned to depart on 31 December from Izbet Abed Rabbo, an area devastated during Operation Cast Lead, and head towards Erez, the crossing point to Israel at the northern end of the Gaza Strip. This march was intended to be one year after the Israeli assault on Gaza which saw over 1,400 Palestinian casualties. The BDS movement stated that the march itself was “inspired by decades of nonviolent Palestinian resistance from the mass popular uprisings of the first Intifada to the West Bank villagers currently resisting the land grab of Israel’s annexationist wall.”

More than 1350 people from 42 countries around the world were planning to join Palestinians in the march, among them Medea Benjamin, Alice Walker, Ronnie Kasrils, Alima Boumediene-Thiery, Hedy Epstein, Yusif Barakat, Roger Waters, Starhawk, Louie Vitale, and Ann Wright. However, the Egyptian authorities disallowed the protest, and the march could not take place as planned. The march drew inspiration from various other campaigns such as Free Gaza Movement and Viva Palestina.

== Endorsers and participants ==
Endorsers of the march included Howard Zinn, Gore Vidal, Arun Gandhi, Naomi Klein and Noam Chomsky. Norman Finkelstein, who is a controversial figure among many as he opposed BDS but is an avid supporter of Palestinians, was an initial supporter, but later withdrew his endorsement saying that the new statement of context for the march brought in too many contentious issues. Berkeley student organizer Ali Glenesk coordinated student outreach for the march, and over 100 students planned to participate.

Luisa Morgantini, Alima Boumediene-Thiery, Duraid Lahham and Walden Bello also planned to participate in the Gaza Freedom March. Hedy Epstein, a Holocaust survivor, remarked on the planned day of the march that “there comes a time in one’s life when maybe one needs to do more than just talk (in order to) to change the opinion of the Egyptian government so that they will let [us] go to Gaza.” There were to be an estimated 50,000 Palestinians that were going to participate in the march. BDS, the pro-Palestinian organization, made an official call for the march in late October 2009 and called the blockade of Gaza “a flagrant violation of international law” and also stated that the march’s purpose was to push Egypt to lift the siege on Gaza and for Israel to end its decades-long blockage on the region. Contrary to coverage of the Gaza Freedom March in the Arab world, coverage was minimal in the United States and other western countries.

== Plans for the march ==
The march had many obstacles from the beginning, but the ideas that were planned were substantial. According to the Gaza Freedom March website, the march was supposed to, “…feature hip hop music (including a song written especially for the march) and commentary on the impact of the siege by farmers, fishermen, merchants and others. Upon reaching Erez crossing, balloons, kites and/or flags will be flown to express solidarity with Palestinians and Israeli peace activists on the other side.” The march's goal was to bring attention to the horrific attacks on Palestinians in Gaza. Other endorsing groups included American Friends Service Committee, Meta Peace Team, and Palestinian unions who all planned on meeting together in Cairo. Approximately 1400 people planned to protest until Egypt denied entry to Gaza following pressure from the United States and Israel. This blockade continues to this day. However, Egypt did allow 100 protesters to enter Gaza.

== Entry to Gaza denied by Egyptian authorities ==
On December 20, 2009, the Egyptian government announced that it would not allow anyone to cross into Gaza from Egypt, effectively banning the march. The government issued a warning that anyone attempting to cross at Rafah would be, "dealt with by the law." The Egyptian authorities went so far as to revoke permits for public gathering areas and force bus and shuttle companies to cancel previous contracts they had made with march organizers. In fact, 25 Americans were detained outside the United States Embassy in Cairo, Egypt as well as seven or eight inside the embassy. The reason for Americans participating in the march approaching the Embassy was to implore the United States to ensure that Egypt allowed Americans to enter Gaza with humanitarian aid in order to offer help to Gazans. The Americans seeking refuge at the U.S Embassy were met with riot police and K-9 units. Prior to the march, organizers were stationed in Cairo, waiting to travel into Gaza when the time came. They were supposed to meet with organizers in Gaza to help start the march, but the Egyptian government refused to let the organizers in. It was at this moment that the organizers began to be worried about whether or not the march would happen. Prior to this, most organizers believed that they were going to be let in with no problems.

The more than 1,300 internationals in the delegation intending to go to Gaza had asked that Egypt reconsider its ban, which included disallowing the Gaza Freedom March from delivering hundreds of tonnes of aid. The aid, which included specialised medical equipment and powdered milk for babies, sat in Aqaba, a Jordanian port town, awaiting Egyptian permission to enter Egypt. The Egyptian Government recommended that the organizers should use their time in Cairo as a vacation, but the organizers chose to go against the government's recommendation by holding public gatherings and demonstrations in the city. To stop this, Egyptian police sent police trucks to block organizers in and prevent them from leaving their hotels. The ones that managed to escape were dragged away and beaten by Egyptian police. Finally, only a small group of 100 compared to the over a thousand there were let in, and those left behind looked at those driving away with malice. The final 86 which were let in had to face another obstacle of non-governmental sponsors pulling out. Once inside, the group was able to hold the nonviolent protest, which included a conference, chanting freedom songs, and all of the posters littered with “Free Gaza." The 100 internationals that were let in were joined by several hundred Palestinians as they marched toward the border. Around 300 were also protesting on the Israeli side of the border.
