= Sickles High School =

Public high school in Florida, United States

Walter L. Sickles High School
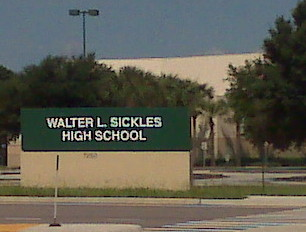

Location
- 7950 Gunn Hwy; Citrus Park, Hillsborough County, Florida 33626; United States; 28°04′45″N 82°34′57″W

Information
- Type: Public High School
- Motto: “Loyalty, Integrity, and Dignity.”
- Established: 1997
- Status: Open and operating
- School district: Hillsborough County Public Schools
- Principal: Krista Luloff
- Teaching staff: 99-100 (2023-2024)
- Grades: 9–12
- Enrollment: 2,389 (2023–2024)
- Student to teacher ratio: 24:1 (2023-2024)
- Campus size: 86 acres
- Colors: Green, grey, and white
- Fight song: "Stand Up and Cheer"
- Athletics conference: Sunshine State Conference
- Sports: Football
- Mascot: Griff the Gryphon
- Nickname: Gryphons
- Rival: Braulio Alonso High School
- Yearbook: Sollerette
- Website: www.hillsboroughschools.org/o/sickles

Walter L. Sickles High School is a public high school located in Citrus Park, Florida, United States. Established in 1997, the school was named in honor of Walter L. Sickles, a former superintendent of Hillsborough County Public Schools. Sickles High School offers a comprehensive academic program, a wide array of extracurricular activities, and a commitment to student success. The school is known for its strong athletics, dedicated faculty, and notable alumni, making it a cornerstone of the local community.

== Academics ==
As of 2010, Sickles High School was meeting the Adequate Yearly Progress mandated under the federal No Child Left Behind Act.According to the Florida Department of Education, Sickles High School was graded as an “A” rated High School on their 2012-2013 School Accountability Report.Sickles High School offers a robust academic program, with approximately 27 Advanced Placement courses. About 45 percent of students enroll in at least one AP class, and the AP pass rate is approximately 70 percent. The school also provides a Gifted and Talented program and the AP Capstone Diploma.

== School Grade by Year ==
School Year	Grade
2012-2013	A
2017-2018	A
2018-2019	A
2019-2020	A
2023-2024	A

== Demographics ==
Race / Ethnicity	2023-2024 Population	2023-2024 Percentage
White	999	41.5%
Hispanic or Latino	958	40.1%
Black or African American	110	4.6%
Asian	196	8.2%
Native American or Alaska Native	2	0.1%
Two or more races or Multiracial	124	5.5%
Total	2,389	100%

== Student life ==
Sickles High School offers a variety of clubs and activities, including the Cultural Appreciation Group, the Student Government Association, and the National Honor Society. The school has a well-regarded band program, known as the Marching Wall of Sound, that plays at events like football games, pep rallies, and Spirit Week. Around 88 percent of students say there are plenty of club options, and 86 percent feel safe at school.

=== Athletics ===
Sickles High School’s athletic teams are called the Gryphons, and they compete under the Florida High School Athletic Association. The school offers a wide range of sports for both boys and girls, including basketball, cross country, football, soccer, swimming, and more. Notably, the football team reached the state championships in both 2013 and 2015, winning the title in 2015.

== Notable alumni ==
- John Henson, NBA basketball player
- Ray-Ray McCloud, NFL wide receiver
- Dillon Mitchell, basketball player
- Chris Oladokun, NFL, Kansas City Chiefs, quarterback
- Michael Prysner, political activist
- Kenny Wilson, Major League Baseball player
