= Kevin Danaher (activist) =

American author and activist

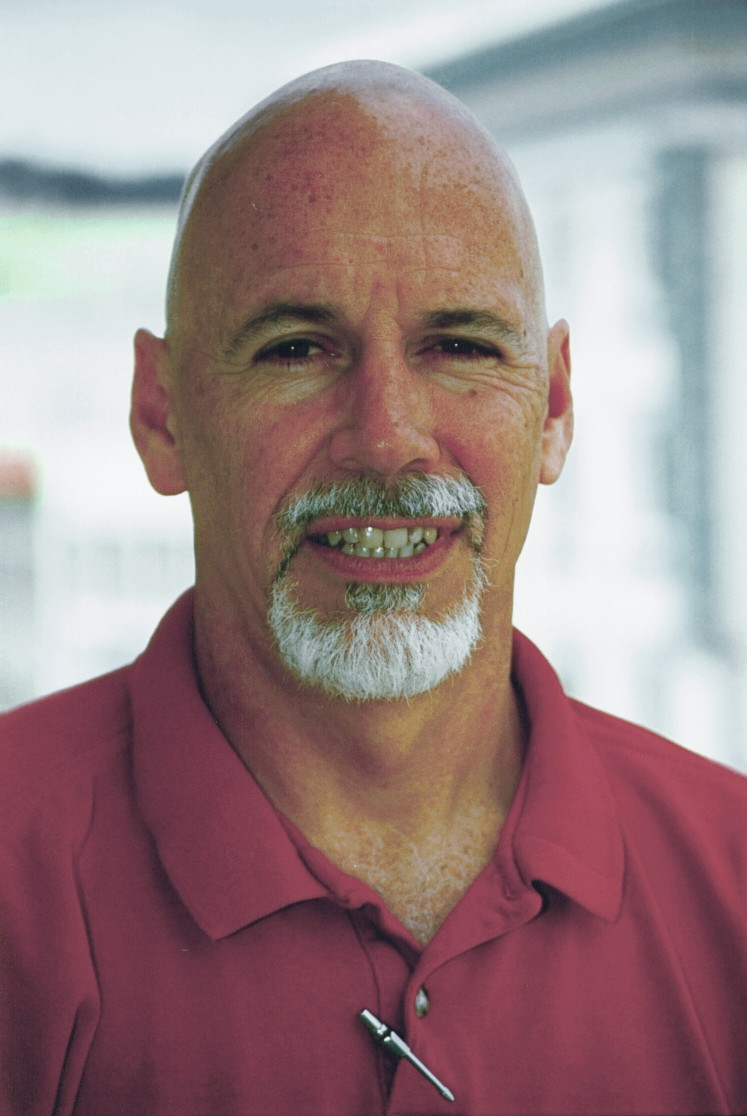
- Born: July 11, 1950 (age 76); New Jersey, U.S.
- Education: Sonoma State University; University of California, Santa Cruz
- Occupations: Political activist, author
- Spouse: Medea Benjamin
- Children: 2

Kevin Danaher (born July 11, 1950) is an American author and anti-globalization activist. With his wife Medea Benjamin and activist Kirsten Irgens-Moller, he co-founded Global Exchange, a social justice and anti-globalization non-governmental organization based in San Francisco, California. He is the founder and executive co-producer of the Green Festivals and he is executive Director of the Global Citizen Center. He received his Ph.D. in sociology from the University of California, Santa Cruz.

== Early life and education ==
Kevin Danaher was born in New Jersey on July 11, 1950.

Danaher is from an Irish Catholic family and is the youngest of three children. His father, who was a bus driver, had immigrated from Ireland. He had an interest in politics and had been a messenger for the Irish Republican Army (IRA). In a 2003 article for Sfgate by Tom Abate, Danaher said that the stories he heard from his father about the IRA made him what he is today.

He graduated from high school in 1968, at which time he was drafted to fight in the Vietnam War, but purposefully failed his physical in order to avoid being deployed. He then worked as a truck driver and bricklayer, as well as spending nights as a bass guitarist for a band (The Everlovin) that primarily played in strip clubs and topless bars. Eventually moving West, he met a woman in Los Gatos, California, where he settled.

Danaher attended De Anza College in Cupertino for a time, followed by attending Sonoma State University, where he graduated with an undergraduate degree in sociology. Following this, he obtained a Ph.D. from the University of California, Santa Cruz, writing his thesis on the boycott movement against the apartheid regime of South Africa.

== Personal life ==
In 1985, Danaher married Medea Benjamin, who comes from Long Island, New York. They have two daughters.

== Activism ==
In an interview with Miguel Bocanegra in February 2000, Danaher said that his government's trying to send him to Vietnam caused him to question what his government was doing, namely the bombing of people who were no threat to the U.S. In the early days, he wrote a dissertation on U.S. policy towards South Africa in what he saw as U.S. policy being supportive of the white minority against the black majority.

He was critical and vocal about the 2003 invasion of Iraq. Along with Scott Ritter, Daniel Ellsberg, Jody Williams, Norman Mailer, Noam Chomsky, and Medea Benjamin, he appeared in the film Hijacking Catastrophe: 9/11, Fear & the Selling of American Empire.

== Professional background ==
From 1979 to 1983, Danaher was with American University in Washington, DC, as an adjunct professor. By 1982, he had earned a Ph.D. in sociology at UC Santa Cruz. In 1984, having moved back to the Bay Area, he was working with Food First as a senior analyst.

== Bibliography ==
- Building the Green Economy: Success Stories from the Grassroots. With Shannon Biggs and Jason Dove Mark. (September 2007) PoliPoint Press. ISBN 978-0-9778253-6-3
- Insurrection: The Citizen Challenge to Corporate Power. With Jason Dove Mark, foreword by Arianna Huffington. (2003) Routledge. ISBN 0-415-94677-8
- 10 reasons to abolish the IMF & World Bank. Foreword by Anuradha Mittal. (2001) Seven Stories. ISBN 1-58322-464-5
- Globalize This! The Battle Against the World Trade Organization and Corporate Rule with Roger Burbach. (2000) Common Courage Press. ISBN 1-56751-196-1
- Corporations Are Gonna Get Your Mama: Globalization and the Downsizing of the American Dream. (1997) Common Courage Press. ISBN 1-56751-112-0
- 50 years is enough: the case against the World Bank and the International Monetary Fund. Boston, Mass: South End Press. 1994. ISBN 0-89608-495-7.

== Filmography ==
Film
Title	Role	Director	Year	Notes #
Timber GAP	Himself	James Ficklin, Kay Rudin	2000	
Trading Freedom: The Secret Life of the FTAA	Himself		2002	David Suzuki appears as well
Hijacking Catastrophe: 9/11, Fear & the Selling of American Empire	Himself	Jeremy Earp, Sut Jhally	2004	
Hannity & Colmes Episode dated 25 January 2006	Himself		2006	Kimberly Guilfoyle also appears
Project Censored the Movie	Himself	Doug Hecker, Christopher Oscar	2013	
