= Turn Your Back on Bush =

Political protest movement

Turn Your Back on Bush was a form of protest in the United States to express dissatisfaction with former president George W. Bush. The first known protest took place on June 14, 2002, in Columbus, Ohio, where President Bush delivered a commencement address to the graduating class of Ohio State University and an audience of over 50,000 people.

== Background ==
A group identified as a coalition of concerned students, graduates, alumni, faculty, staff, guests, and community members on the website turnyourbackonbush.com instructed participants to "stand up silently and turn your back while Bush gives his commencement address." The students and guests at the event were publicly threatened by University administration if they participated in protest.

The phrase was first coined by Hillary Tinapple, one of the organizers of the Ohio State University commencement protest and member of the 2002 graduating class. Since the controversial second election of Bush, Turn Your Back on Bush has become a grassroots organization, co-founded by Jet Heiko.

On January 20, 2005, a Turn Your Back on Bush demonstration took place at the President's second Inaugural parade. The organization's website states that over 5,000 people from around the country participated in this protest by lining the parade route with their backs turned while the motorcade passed by. This was among many counter-inauguration protests that took place in Washington, D.C., and around the United States on that same day (see January 20, 2005 counter-inaugural protest).

Media coverage of the Turn Your Back on Bush inaugural protest appeared in several mainstream publications and was used in a segment of NBC's comedy television show Saturday Night Live.
