= Kingdom of the Unjust =

2016 book by Medea Benjamin

- Behind the U.S.-Saudi Connection
- Author: Medea Benjamin
- Language: English
- Genre: Political Science
- Published: OR Books
- Publication date: 2016
- Pages: 240
- ISBN: 978-1944869021

The Kingdom of the Unjust: Behind the US-Saudi Connection is a 2016 Political Science book authored by Medea Benjamin. This book explains the history of the Saudi Arabia government, its relationship with the United States, and its treatment of women.

== Author ==
Medea Benjamin is a political activist and one of the founders of CODEPINK, an organization promoting peace. Benjamin has won peace awards including the Martin Luther King, Jr. Peace Prize from the Fellowship of Reconciliation, the Peace Prize by the US Peace Memorial, the Gandhi Peace Award, and the Nuclear Age Peace Foundation Award.

== Motivation ==
The author of Kingdom of the Unjust says she was motivated by the amount of weapons bought by Saudi Arabia. Then Benjamin considered the human rights in Saudi Arabia for women. Realizing something about the country was wrong, she decided to inform Americans about Saudi Arabia's connections with the United States. She wrote "Kingdom of the Unjust", hoping to change the political dimension.

How Saudi Arabia gains its power and how it influences the world are two important goals addressed by the writer.

== Context ==
Kingdom of the Unjust – Behind the US-Saudi Connection is a collection of reliable information about the Saudi Arabia political system and its relationship with the United States.

The book consists of seven short chapters which explain the some aspects of Saudi Arabia government that are addressed by social media. Also it describes how political leaders' attempts to disseminate calls for peace are prevented by the country's politic system.

Benjamin explains the origins of Saudi Arabian government and how it achieved increasing influence. The author describes the marriage between the followers of Sheikh Mohammed bin Abd Al-Wahhab and the Al Saud family. In addition she tries to separate Wahhabism from Islam, as one of branch of it. As a CODEPINK peace promoter, she concentrates on issues of justice in Saudi Arabia and describes gender inequalities causing limitations for women. The connection of Saudi Arabia and United States is examined and the nature of this connection and reasons for its continuation are expressed. Finally, Benjamin indicates how the connection could evolve and shows how people can help to weaken the "immoral global alliance".

She explains how Saudi Arabian-led intervention in Yemen and support for terrorists in Syria contribute to the relationship between Saudi Arabia and the United States.

== Reception ==
According to the journal Alghoul, the book presents a complete list of actions that Saudi Arabia has performed while violating human rights. According to this book, Benjamin has embarked on a campaign to stop weapon sales to the Saudi government. She also tries to establish freedom of religion the Shia and Christian peoples. For this goal this author has made contact with people and authorities in Saudi Arabia.

== See also ==
- Saudi Arabia–United States relations
- Walid Fitaihi
