= Kenny Wilson (baseball) =

American baseball player (born 1990)

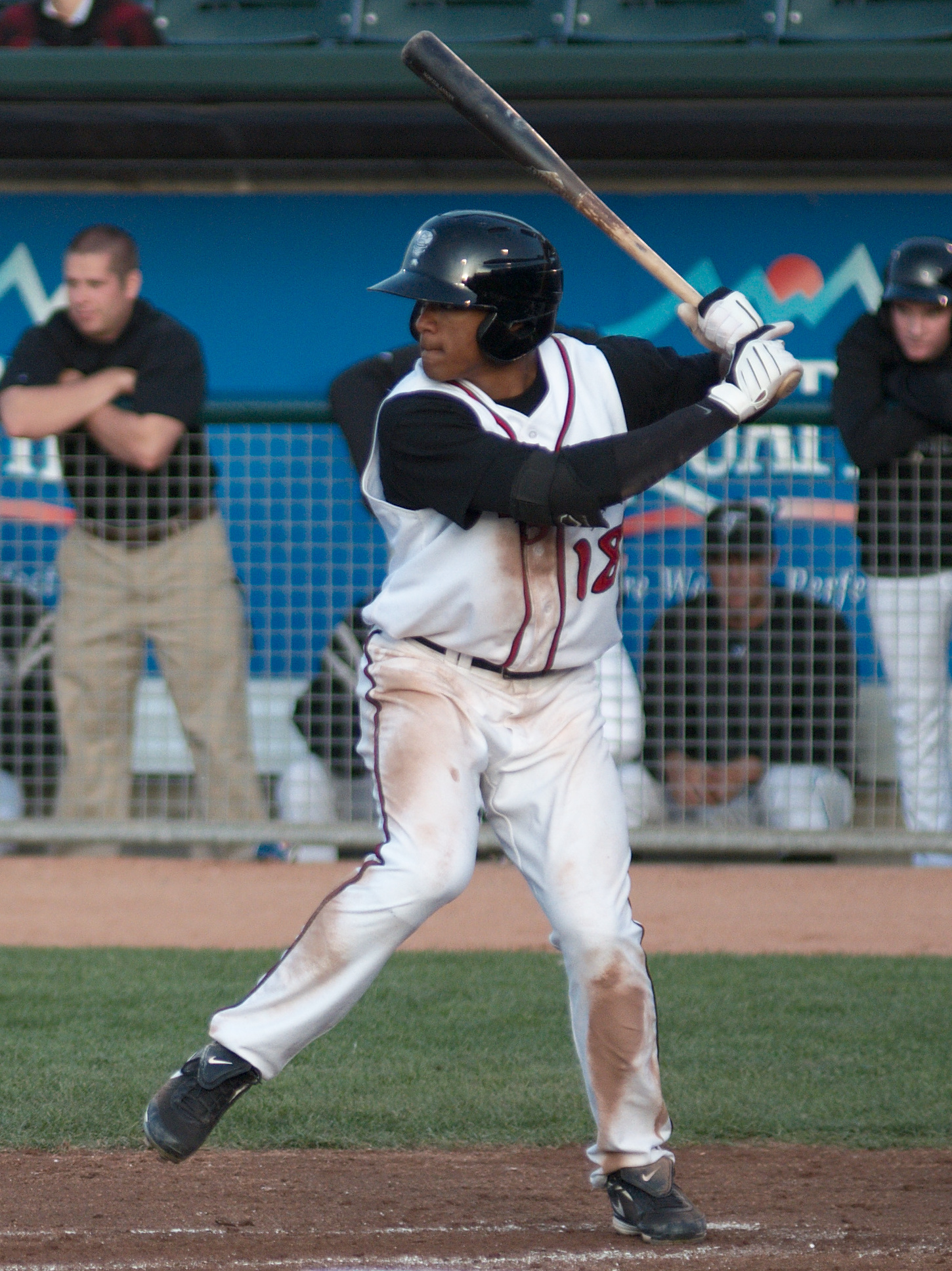
- Wilson with the Lansing Lugnuts in 2010
- Outfielder
- Born: January 30, 1990 (age 36); Tampa, Florida, U.S.
- Bats: Right Throws: Right
- Stats at Baseball Reference

Kenneth Earl Wilson (born January 30, 1990) is an American former professional baseball outfielder and Battlefield 6 REDSEC streamer on Twitch.

== Career ==
=== Toronto Blue Jays ===
Wilson attended Sickles High School in Tampa, Florida. He committed to attend the University of Florida on a college baseball scholarship. The Toronto Blue Jays selected Wilson in the second round, with the 63rd overall selection, of the 2008 Major League Baseball draft. Wilson signed with the Blue Jays, receiving a $644,000 signing bonus, and began his professional career with the Gulf Coast Blue Jays.

In the 2011-12 offseason, they assigned Wilson to play for the Canberra Cavalry of the Australian Baseball League. In 2012, he played for the Lansing Lugnuts of the Class A Midwest League. After the 2013 season, the Blue Jays added Wilson to their 40-man roster. On March 10, 2014, he was optioned to the Double-A New Hampshire Fisher Cats. Wilson was designated for assignment on April 22, to make room on the 40-man roster for Darin Mastroianni.

=== Minnesota Twins ===
Wilson was claimed by the Minnesota Twins on April 24, 2014, and assigned to the Double-A New Britain Rock Cats. He made 11 appearances for New Britain, slashing .195/.327/.268 with one RBI and three stolen bases.

=== Toronto Blue Jays (second stint) ===
Wilson was designated for assignment on May 9, 2014. The Blue Jays claimed Wilson back on waivers on May 11, 2014, and assigned him to New Hampshire. He was again designated for assignment on July 5, this time to make room for Cole Gillespie.

=== Oakland Athletics ===
Wilson was claimed by the Oakland Athletics on July 7, 2014. He made 27 appearances for the Double-A Midland RockHounds, hitting .327 with eight RBI and seven stolen bases; in 14 contests for the Triple-A Sacramento River Cats, he hit .135 with five RBI and two stolen bases. Wilson was designated for assignment by Oakland following the promotion of Billy Burns on July 28.

=== Miami Marlins ===
On November 6, 2014, Wilson signed a minor league contract with the Miami Marlins. He played in 130 games for the Double–A Jacksonville Suns, hitting .270/.348/.394 with eight home runs, 48 RBI, and 37 stolen bases. Wilson elected free agency following the season on November 6, 2015.

On November 12, 2015, Wilson re–signed with the Marlins organization on a new minor league contract. He split the 2016 campaign between Jacksonville and the Triple–A New Orleans Zephyrs, batting an aggregate .255/.346/.336 with three home runs, 32 RBI, and 30 stolen bases. Wilson elected free agency following the season on November 7, 2016.

=== Oakland Athletics (second stint) ===
On November 16, 2016, Wilson signed a minor league contract with the Oakland Athletics. He spent 2017 with both the Midland RockHounds and the Nashville Sounds, where he posted a combined .240 batting average with three home runs and 26 RBI in 90 games between both clubs. He elected free agency following the season on November 6, 2017.

=== Detroit Tigers ===
On December 21, 2017, Wilson signed a minor league contract with the Detroit Tigers.

=== Chicago Dogs ===
On July 7, 2018, Wilson signed with the Chicago Dogs of the American Association of Independent Professional Baseball.

=== Generales de Durango ===
On January 26, 2019, Wilson signed with the Generales de Durango of the Mexican League. He was released on May 14, 2019.
