= Project Censored =

American nonprofit media watchdog and media literacy group

- Founded: 1976; 50 years ago
- Founder: Carl Jensen
- Type: 501(c)(3) nonprofit organization
- Purpose: Journalism, independent media, freedom of speech, solutions journalism
- Location: Fair Oaks, California
- Board of directors: Mickey Huff (director)
- Website: www.projectcensored.org

Project Censored is a nonprofit media watchdog organization in the United States. The group's stated mission is to "educate students and the public about the importance of a truly free press for democratic self-government."

Project Censored produces an annual book and a weekly radio program. Both the annual books and the weekly radio programs, as well as public events sponsored by the Project, focus on issues of news censorship, propaganda, free speech, and media literacy. Past editions of the yearbook were published by Seven Stories Press.

Project Censored was founded at Sonoma State University in 1976 by Carl Jensen (1929-2015). Since 2010, Mickey Huff has been the group's director. It is sponsored by the Media Freedom Foundation, a 501(c)(3) non-profit organization, established in 2000. The organization is based in Ithaca, New York.

== History ==
Project Censored was founded in 1976 by Carl Jensen, Associate Professor of Media Studies at Sonoma State College, as a media research program. The project focused on student media literacy and critical thinking skills, with particular attention to issues of censorship by the mainstream news media in the United States.

Corporate media reporters, editors, and executives lampooned Jensen for claiming they "censored" news stories. They argued that the stories were not censored, but that due to time and space constraints, they could not publish every story. Jensen began an annual study that found that, rather than covering newsworthy stories, the corporate media often featured trivial and non-newsworthy stories, which Jensen termed "junk food news" in a 1983 interview published in Penthouse. Since the first Censored yearbook, published in 1993, each annual Censored volume has featured a chapter dedicated to exposing examples of what Jensen originally identified as "junk food news".

In 1996, when Jensen retired, Peter Phillips, also a sociology professor at Sonoma State University, became director of Project Censored. He continued to expand the Project's educational outreach and the annual book, adding the concept and analysis of "News Abuse" to elaborate Jensen's idea of "junk food" news. "News abuse" refers to corporate media stories that were newsworthy, but presented in a slanted or non-newsworthy manner.

In 2000, Project Censored came under the oversight of the non-profit Media Freedom Foundation, founded by Jensen and Phillips, to ensure its independence. In 2007, two Project Censored judges resigned over then-director Peter Phillips' decision to invite Steven E. Jones, a 9/11 Truth conspiracy theorist, as the keynote speaker at the Project's annual conference.

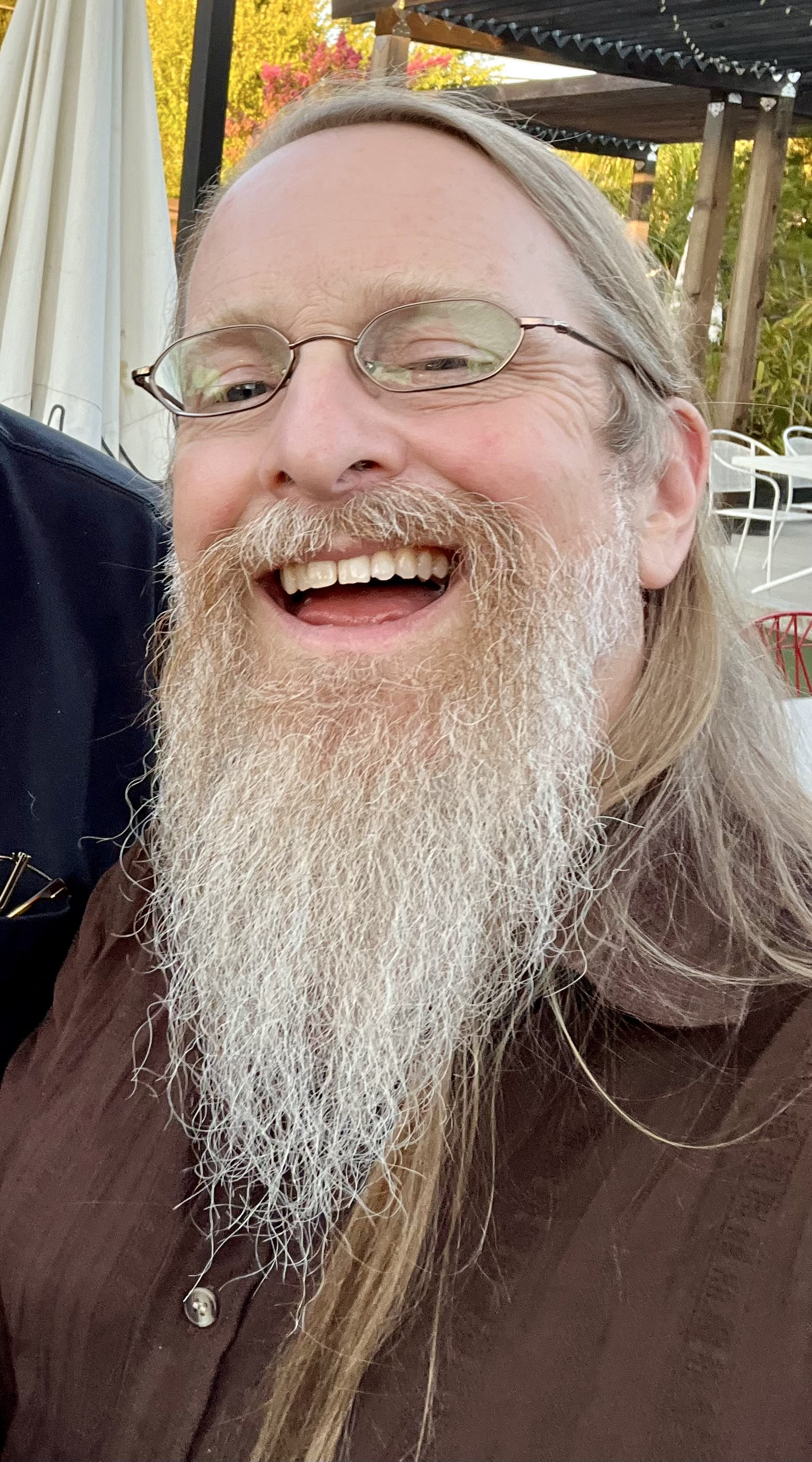
Mickey Huff, director, 2024

Mickey Huff of Diablo Valley College became the director in 2010. He and Andy Lee Roth (associate director, 2012-2024) extended the Project beyond Sonoma State University, and expanded the Campus Affiliates Program launched in 2009. The top "Censored" news stories are identified through the Campus Affiliates Program, a collaborative effort between faculty and students at many colleges and universities. In 2025, Shealeigh Voitl became associate director.

== Activities ==
=== Publications ===
Since 1993, Project Censored has published its annual list of the most under-reported news stories in the form of a book. Since 1996, Seven Stories Press in New York has published each annual Censored book. The first Project Censored yearbook, Censored: The News That Didn’t Make the News—And Why, edited by Carl Jensen, was published by Shelburne Press in 1993. Two subsequent volumes, the 1994 and 1995 yearbooks, were published by Four Walls Eight Windows. From 2022 to 2025, the yearbooks were jointly published by Seven Stories Press and Project Censored’s publishing imprint, The Censored Press. The 2026 yearbook will be published solely by The Censored Press.

The organization's annual listing of the most significant but under-reported news stories, dating back to 1976, is archived on the Project Censored website. Previous years' "Censored" lists have been featured in U.S. national media outlets.

==== Censored Press ====
The Censored Press was established in 2021 by Project Censored and the Media Freedom Foundation. The Censored Press has published a number of notable titles, including Going Remote: A Teacher's Journey (2022), Guilty of Journalism: The Political Case Against Julian Assange (2023), and Titans of Capital: How Concentrated Wealth Threatens Humanity (2024), each of which was co-published by Seven Stories Press.

=== Documentary films ===
Project Censored has been the subject of two feature-length documentary films. In 2013, Doug Hecker and Christopher Oscar produced and directed Project Censored: The Movie: Ending the Reign of Junk Food News. The film features interviews with and commentary by Noam Chomsky, Howard Zinn, Dan Rather, Phil Donahue, Michael Parenti, Greg Palast, Oliver Stone, Daniel Ellsberg, Peter Kuznick, Cynthia McKinney, Nora Barrows-Friedman, John Perkins, Jonah Raskin, Khalil Bendib, Abby Martin, and faculty and students associated with Project Censored.

Project Censored: The Movie screened at numerous film festivals, including its premiere at the Sonoma International Film Festival in April 2013, the Bend Film Festival in October 2013, and the Madrid International Film Festival in July 2013, where Doug Hecker and Christopher Oscar were recognized for Best Directing of a Feature Documentary.

In 1998, Differential Films released Project Censored: Is the Press Really Free?, directed and produced by Steven Keller. In May 2000, Project Censored: Is the Press Really Free? aired on PBS stations across the United States.

== Reception ==
Ralph Nader described Project Censored as "a deep, wide and utterly engrossing exercise to unmask censorship, self-censorship, and propaganda in the mass media." In December 2013, Nader selected Censored 2014: Fearless Speech in Fateful Times as one of his "10 Books to Provoke Conversation" in 2014.

In 2000, Don Hazen, the first executive director of the progressive news analysis and commentary website AlterNet, criticized Project Censored as "stuck in the past" with a "dubious selection process" that "reinforces self-marginalizing, defeatist behavior". It has also been criticized for reporting on stories that are arguably not "under-reported" or "censored" at all, as they have appeared in The New York Times and other such high-profile publications. Furthermore, the organization's use of the term "censorship" to describe under-reported items, rather than governmentally censored material, has been called into question. William Powers, writing in The New Republic, called this broad use of the term "pernicious and deceptive."

New Politics magazine criticized Project Censored for denying Serbian war crimes in the Yugoslav Wars, both crimes in Kosovo committed by Slobodan Milošević's government (such as the Račak massacre), and the Bosnian genocide committed by the Army of Republika Srpska, highlighting Michael Parenti's denial in the 2000 volume.

== Awards ==
The 1995 edition of Censored: The News That Didn’t Make the News—And Why won the 1996 Firecracker Alternative Book Award for Nonfiction.

In 2008, Project Censored received PEN Oakland's Censorship award.
