= William D. Hartung =

American foreign policy scholar (born 1955)

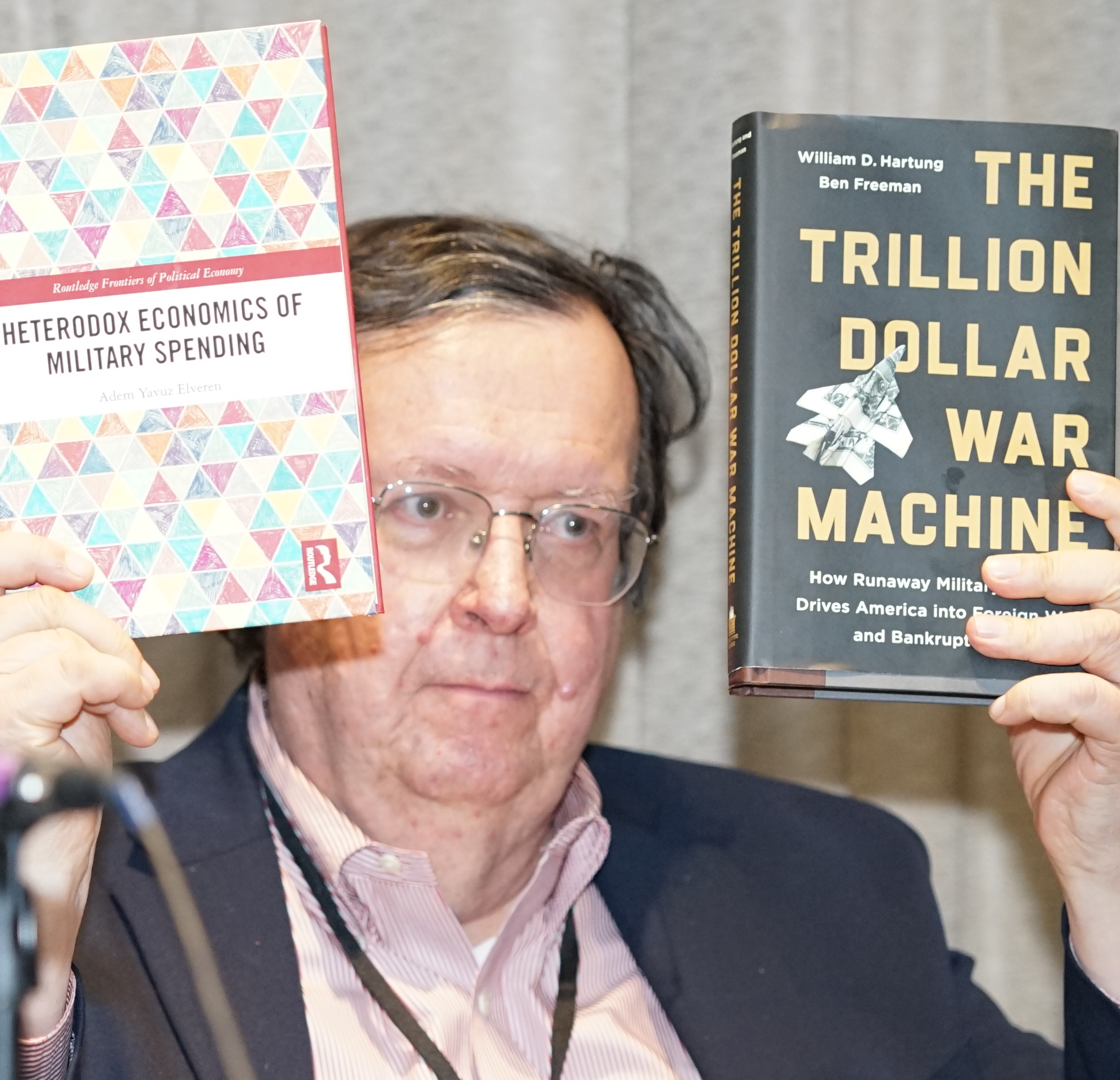
- Hartung at ASSA 2026
- Born: June 7, 1955 (age 71)
- Occupations: Political scientist; author

William D. Hartung (born June 7, 1955) is an American political scientist and author. He is a senior research fellow at the Quincy Institute for Responsible Statecraft, where his work focuses on the arms industry and U.S. military budget.

== Life ==
Hartung is the former director of the Arms and Security Project at the Center for International Policy, a former senior research fellow in the New America Foundation's American Strategy Program, and is former director of the Arms Trade Resource Center at the World Policy Institute.

He specializes in questions of weapons proliferation, the economics of military spending, and alternative approaches to national security strategy. Hartung was director of the Arms and Security Initiative at the New America Foundation. Prior to that, he was director of the Arms Trade Resource Center at the World Policy Institute. He also worked as a speechwriter and policy analyst for New York State Attorney General Robert Abrams.

He has contributed to the Bulletin of the Atomic Scientists, The Nation, The New York Times, The Washington Post, and Mother Jones.

He featured in the documentaries Hijacking Catastrophe: 9/11, Fear & the Selling of American Empire (2004) and Making a Killing: Inside the International Arms Trade (2006).

Hartung opposed the Iraq War and criticised the war on terror on the basis that it would not "quell the political powerlessness and frustration that fuels terrorism" in the Middle East, and that the Bush administration lacked moral authority as it supported Israel and undemocratic regimes.

Hartung resides in N.Y.

== Works ==
- And Weapons For All HarperCollins, 1995, ISBN 0-06-092641-4
- William D. Hartung (2003). How Much are You Making on the War, Daddy?: A Quick and Dirty Guide to War Profiteering in the Bush Administration. Nation Books. pp. 145–. ISBN 978-1-56025-561-1.
- Prophets of War: Lockheed Martin and the Making of the Military-Industrial Complex (Large Print 16pt). ReadHowYouWant.com. December 2010. ISBN 978-1-4596-0893-1.
- Miriam Pemberton; William D. Hartung (2008). Lessons from Iraq: avoiding the next war. Paradigm Publishers. ISBN 978-1-59451-498-2.
- Hartung, William D.; Freeman, Ben (2025). The Trillion Dollar War Machine: How Runaway Military Spending Drives America into Foreign Wars and Bankrupts Us at Home. Bold Type Books. ISBN 978-1645030638.
