= Cole Gillespie =

American baseball player (born 1984)

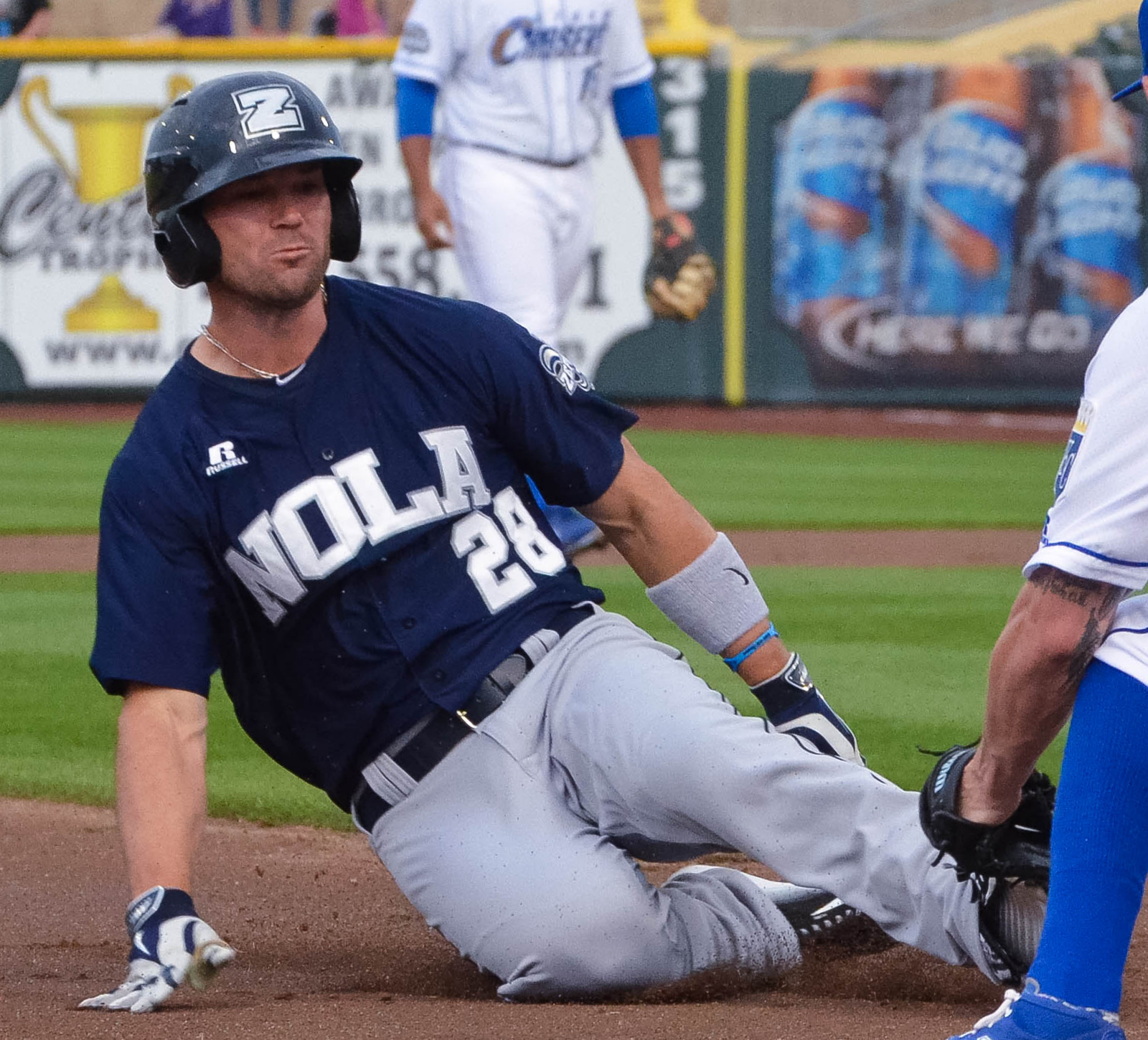
- Gillespie with the New Orleans Zephyrs
- Outfielder
- Born: June 20, 1984 (age 42); Portland, Oregon, U.S.
- Batted: Right Threw: Right

MLB debut
- April 21, 2010, for the Arizona Diamondbacks

Last MLB appearance
- July 27, 2016, for the Miami Marlins

MLB statistics
- Batting average: .251
- Home runs: 6
- Runs batted in: 46
- Stats at Baseball Reference

Teams
- Arizona Diamondbacks (2010–2011); San Francisco Giants (2013); Chicago Cubs (2013); Seattle Mariners (2014); Toronto Blue Jays (2014); Miami Marlins (2015–2016)

Cole Braden Gillespie (born June 20, 1984) is an American former professional baseball outfielder. He played in Major League Baseball (MLB) for the Arizona Diamondbacks, San Francisco Giants, Chicago Cubs, Seattle Mariners, Toronto Blue Jays, and Miami Marlins.

== Amateur career ==
Gillespie was born in Portland, Oregon and raised in West Linn, Oregon, attending West Linn High School, the alma of former MLB pitcher Mitch Williams. For West Linn, Gillespie was a three-year letterman and won All-State honors as a shortstop and was also a standout pitcher. Gillespie also competed in football and basketball at West Linn, and later attended Oregon State University. After redshirting his freshman year at Oregon State, Gillespie won the Most Improved Player award his junior season and then later became a captain of the team. As a senior captain, Gillespie helped lead the Beavers to the 2006 Division I National Championship over the North Carolina Tar Heels and was also named the Pacific-10 Conference Player of the Year.

== Career ==
=== Milwaukee Brewers ===
Gillespie was drafted by the Milwaukee Brewers in the third round of the 2006 Major League Baseball draft. After going pro in 2006, Gillespie played for their Rookie league Helena Brewers. He was promoted to the Class A-Advanced Brevard County Manatees in 2007. Gillespie spent the entire 2008 season with the Double-A Huntsville Stars. In 2009, he was promoted to the Triple-A Nashville Sounds.

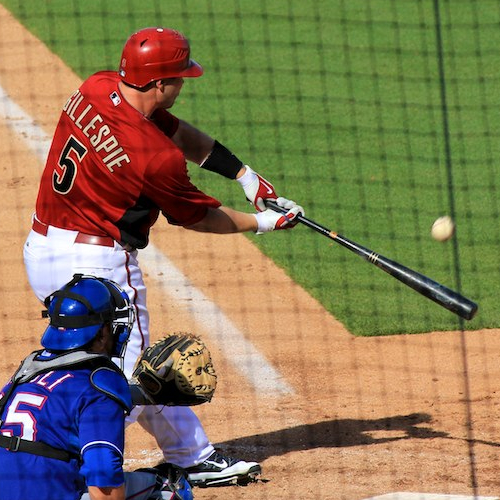
Gillespie batting for the Arizona Diamondbacks in 2011 spring training

=== Arizona Diamondbacks ===
In late July 2009, he was traded to the Arizona Diamondbacks with Roque Mercedes for Felipe López and assigned to Triple-A Reno. Following the season, he was added to the 40 man roster to protect him from the Rule 5 Draft, and made his major league debut in a pinch hitting opportunity on April 21, hitting a double and later scoring a run.

=== San Francisco Giants ===
On December 21, 2012, Gillespie signed a minor league contract with the San Francisco Giants. On July 5, 2013, the Giants purchased his contract and he joined the big league club. After going hitless in 10 plate appearances, he was designated for assignment on July 9, 2013.

=== Chicago Cubs ===
On July 13, 2013, the Chicago Cubs claimed Gillespie off waivers. He was activated on July 14, and got a pinch hit single that night in the eighth inning against the St. Louis Cardinals. He was designated for assignment on September 4, 2013.

=== Seattle Mariners ===
Gillespie signed a minor league deal with the Seattle Mariners in December 2013. He was added to the 25 man roster, starting in left field for the Mariners on April 25, 2014. Going into a June 10 game against the New York Yankees, Gillespie was batting .327 with four multi-hit games, and batted in the cleanup spot for the first time in his major league career. He was designated for assignment on July 4.

=== Toronto Blue Jays ===
On July 5, 2014, Gillespie was claimed off waivers from the Seattle Mariners by the Toronto Blue Jays. Kenny Wilson was designated for assignment to make room for Gillespie. He made his debut with Toronto on July 6 against the Oakland Athletics. He was assigned outright to the Triple-A Buffalo Bisons on August 3. He elected free agency after the season ended.

=== Miami Marlins ===
Gillespie signed a minor league contract with the Miami Marlins on December 6, 2014.

He had his contract purchased by the Miami Marlins on June 27, 2015.

=== Pericos de Puebla ===
On February 27, 2017, Gillespie signed with the Pericos de Puebla of the Mexican League. In 41 games he hit .296/.368/.401 with 2 home runs, 26 RBIs and 4 stolen bases.

=== Acerceros de Monclova ===
On May 20, 2017, he was traded to the Acereros de Monclova for first baseman Nate Freiman. He was released on June 4, 2017. In 10 games he hit .222/.282/.306 with 0 home runs, 3 RBIs and one stolen base.

=== Sugar Land Skeeters ===
On June 16, 2017, Gillespie signed with the Sugar Land Skeeters of the Atlantic League of Professional Baseball. He became a free agent after the 2017 season. In 47 games he hit .302/.385/.479 with 5 home runs, 26 RBIs and 12 stolen bases.

=== San Diego Padres ===
On February 28, 2018, Gillespie signed a minor-league contract with the San Diego Padres. He was released on May 3, 2018.
