= 99%: The Occupy Wall Street Collaborative Film =

- Directed by: Audrey Ewell; Aaron Aites; Lucian Read; Nina Krstic
- Release date: 2013
- Running time: 97 minutes
- Country: United States
- Language: English

99%: The Occupy Wall Street Collaborative Film is a 2013 documentary film about the Occupy Wall Street movement directed by Audrey Ewell, Aaron Aites, Lucian Read, Nina Krstic, and co-directed by Katie Teague, Peter Leeman, Aric Gutnick, Doree Simon, and Abby Martin. The project features the work of more than 100 collaborators who contributed approximately 18 terabytes of film footage from dozens of American cities. Commentators include Naomi Wolf, Matt Taibbi, and Micah White.
