= Iraq Solidarity Campaign =

Political campaign

The Iraq Solidarity Campaign was founded in 2003 and is led by British-born Iraqi writer Hussein Al-Alak. The group is active in protests against the Iraqi invasion and is in various locations throughout the world. The organization was initially established as the Coalition Against Sanctions and War on Iraq in 1997 before transforming into the Iraq Solidarity Campaign in 2003.

The Iraq Solidarity Campaign is an international movement calling for support to the Iraqi people in their efforts to pursue peace, justice, and human rights. Its basis is rooted in anti-war and humanitarian actions brought about by the disastrous consequences of war, foreign intervention, and socio-political turmoil in Iraq. This campaign unites activists, human rights groups, and global individuals who care and express support for Iraqi sovereignty, rebuilding, and well-being of the Iraqi people.

== History ==
The campaign has its origins in the early 2000s, especially following the 2003 Iraq War. With the war resulting in mass destruction, displacement, and loss of human life, global activists and organizations started mobilizing to offer relief, raise awareness, and call for governments participating in the war to be held accountable. Iraq Solidarity Campaign emerged from this need to give voice to the Iraqi people and to call for a peaceful solution to crises.
