= Global Exchange =

US-based non-profit organization

- Abbreviation: GX
- Formation: 1988
- Founders: Medea Benjamin; Kevin Danaher; Kirsten Moller; Kathie Klarreich
- Founded at: San Francisco, California, US
- Type: Nonprofit
- Headquarters: San Francisco, California, US
- Coordinates: 37.776272°N 122.418636°W
- Website: globalexchange.org

Global Exchange was founded in 1988 and is an advocacy group, human rights organization, and a 501(c)(3) organization, based in San Francisco, California, United States. The group defines its mission as, "to promote human rights and social, economic, and environmental justice around the world." Global Exchange deals with a wide range of issues, ranging from the U.S. war in Iraq to worker abuse and fair trade issues.

== History ==
In 1988, Medea Benjamin, Kevin Danaher, Kirsten Moller, and Kathie Klarreich founded Global Exchange. The formation of the organization was rooted in the increasing interdependence of national economies and the subsequent need to build political alliances across national boundaries to promote the group's ideas about economic, social and political rights.

Along with Rainforest Action Network and the Ruckus Society, Global Exchange played a central role in organizing the 1999 Seattle WTO protests against the World Trade Organization (WTO) summit in Seattle in 1999.

For many years Global Exchange produced a Green Festival Expo in Seattle, Washington.

Global Exchange was part of a coalition of groups that charged US retailers, including Gap, with illegally underpaying workers in their sweatshops in Saipan.

In 2011, Global Exchange released a book called, The Rights of Nature: The Case for a Universal Declaration of the Rights of Mother Earth (2011), with articles by Maude Barlow, Pablo Solón Romero, Vandana Shiva, Nnimmo Bassey and others.

=== Programs ===
Global Exchange defined its goals to include increasing public awareness of injustice. They promote change within a profit-oriented global economy, to what it calls ‘people-oriented local economies’ which, supposedly, respect the rights of workers and nature. The Community Rights Program assists communities confronted by corporate projects to assert their right to make decisions, which the group says should be to that place ‘the rights of residents above the legal rights of corporations’.

The Economic Activism for Palestine Project focuses on corporate accountability for human rights and international law violations in Palestine. The program, with an anti-Zionist focus, targets corporations that are directly involved in Israeli settlement activity in the occupied West Bank. They offer an "Economic Activism for Palestine" residency program, participates have included Dalit Baum.

The Fair Trade Program promotes fair trade to end child and forced labor in the cocoa industry, as well as educate consumers to purchase fair trade chocolate. Its corporate campaigns targeted among others Starbucks and M&M's. In 2012 Global Exchange joined with Green America and the International Labor Rights Forum to pressure The Hershey Company to go fair trade and end child labor in the Theobroma cacao fields. The campaign is called Raise the Bar, Hershey.

The Mexico Program confronts the rising violence and unrest. The program is described as developing dialogue and effective advocacy toward bilateral military policies, gun trafficking, drug policy, and democratic reform.

The Elect Democracy campaign challenges corporate money in US politics. The campaign's strategy is to expose the impact of the FIRE economy campaign contributions and to provide factual examples of its belief that a political campaign dependency upon corporate campaign contributions and subsequent corporate lobbying can lead to the prioritization of corporate interests over the needs of the We are the 99%. The ultimate goal of the campaign is to increase accountability through campaign finance reform.

The Green Economy Leadership Training (GELT) Program ran from 2010 to 2012 to implement green economy solutions (home weatherization, establishing urban gardens, etc.) while training individuals in how to build, work and live in a new green economy/clean energy framework. GELT was based in Highland Park, a low-income community in Detroit. Dozens of full-time volunteers worked side-by-side with Highland Park community members to put energy efficiency and LEED for Neighborhood Development guidelines into practice, demonstrating what the transition to and opportunities in a clean energy economy looks like.

Global Exchange offers Reality Tours to various countries of the world with the stated aim of educating the visitor regarding the realities of living in different cultures through using local, independent guides and supporting the local economy. Global Exchange Reality Tours organizes trips to over 30 countries in Latin America, Africa, Asia and the Middle East. Reality Tours offers experiential educational tours, connecting people to issues, issues to movements, and movements to social change social change.

As part of their campaign to reduce oil consumption, on November 29, 2006, two protesters from Global Exchange and Rainforest Action Network, Mike Hudema and Matt Leonard, at the Greater Los Angeles Auto Show illegally disrupted a press stage where General Motors CEO Rick Wagoner was speaking and tried to get him to sign a pledge making GM the most fuel-efficient car company by 2010. Wagoner refused to sign, saying that he promised just that in his keynote speech.

== Criticism ==
The World Trade Organization has claimed that a number of websites such as the Global Exchange, etc., "contain accusations against the WTO which are based on incorrect information or downright falsehoods."

The conservative think tank Capital Research Center has labeled Global Exchange as a "far-left activist group", citing its continuing promotion of tours to Communist-ruled Cuba, and thinks they were responsible for "violent demonstrations" at the World Trade Organization meetings in Seattle in 1999. It also says that Global Exchange appears to be spearheading former Venezuelan President Hugo Chavez's public relations efforts in the United States by offering reality tours for American tourists in Venezuela.
