= Midge Potts =

American artist

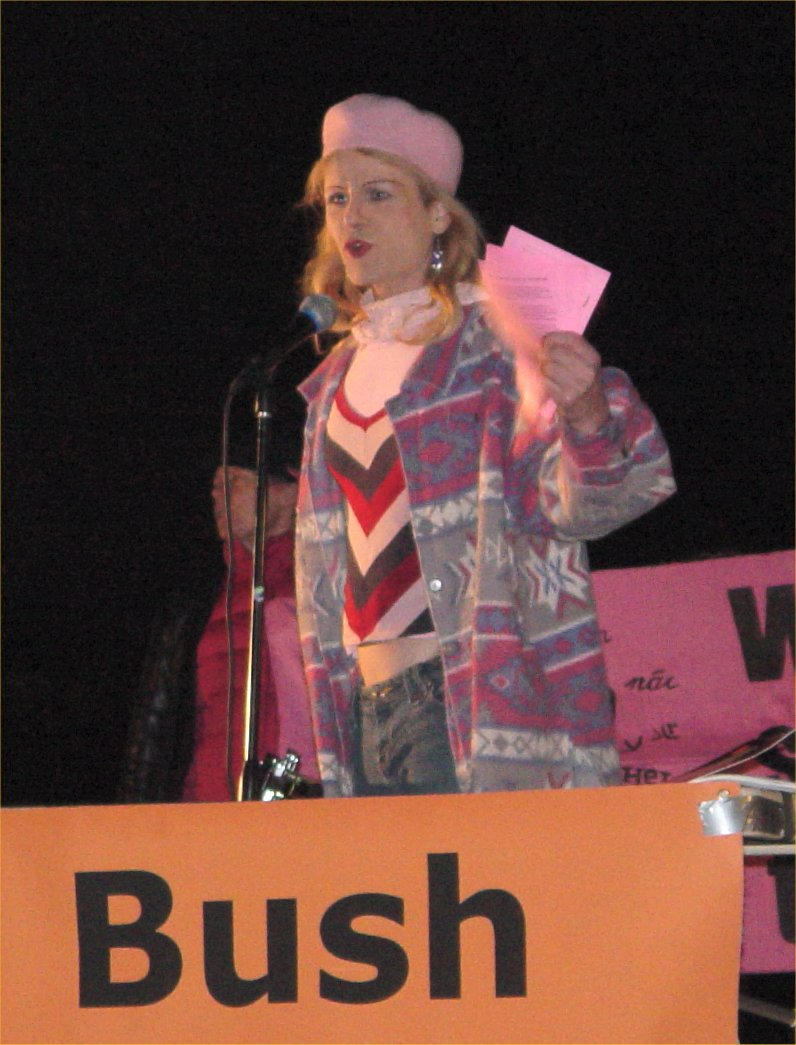
Midge Potts speaks at a protest during the 2007 State of the Union Address.

Midgelle Regina Potts, known as Midge Potts, is a transgender peace activist and Navy veteran who ran as a Progressive Party (Green Party) candidate in the 2010 Missouri Senate election.

== Biography ==
Potts was born in on January 10, 1969, in Gainesville, Missouri.

Potts served aboard the destroyer tender USS Yosemite (AD-19) off the coast of Kuwait during the Gulf War. It was there that Potts was exposed to evaporated mercury in an engine room aboard the ship, and was offered an honorable discharge after failing to get treatment. She now lives off of Social Security disability benefits.

After her discharge Potts reportedly married and had a child, before divorcing in 2003. After the divorce, Potts began living as a woman full-time, and while she began her transition by taking supplements to alter her body's hormones to be more female, she underwent conventional hormone therapy.

She unsuccessfully ran in Missouri's primary for the 7th District Congressional seat as a Republican in 2006 against incumbent Republican Congressman Roy Blunt. Potts received 4294 votes which equated to 7.2 percent of the vote in the Republican primary in the southwest Missouri district.

Potts announced on June 27, 2009, that she would run for the seat being vacated by retiring senator Kit Bond in 2010. Potts had no recordable votes in that election. On March 23, 2015, Potts announced on Facebook possibly seeking another attempt at the Senate seat by stating "Last week, I made an announcement on several Green Party Fb pages stating that I have firmly decided to NOT SEEK THE PRESIDENTIAL NOMINATION in 2016, and instead will most likely run for US Senator against Republican incumbant [sic], Roy Blunt, in my home state of Missouri."
