= Stan Goff =

American anti-war activist, writer, and former special forces soldier (born 1951)

Stan Goff (born November 12, 1951, in San Diego, California) is an American writer, anti-war activist and former special forces soldier. Goff served in the United States Army from 1970 to 1996 with two breaks in service. After retiring from the military he became a political activist, adopting anti-imperialist, feminist, and socialist/Marxist views, and is now a Christian. He is an active blogger and is the author of several books, including Hideous Dream (2000), Full-Spectrum Disorder: The Military in the New American Century (2004), Energy War (2006), Sex & War (2006), Borderline - Reflections on War, Sex, and Church (2015), "Mammon's Ecology - Metaphysic of the Empty Sign" (2018), and "Tough Gynes - Violent Women in Film as Honorary Men" (2019). He has also been a contributor to CounterPunch and Huffington Post.

== Military career ==
Goff was sent to Vietnam in 1970-71 during the Vietnam War. He served with the 173rd Airborne Brigade as an infantryman, after which he was reassigned to the 82nd Airborne Division at Fort Bragg, North Carolina following a bout with drug-resistant malaria. In 1973, he was honorably discharged with the rank of sergeant.

During a break in service, he attended college at the University of Arkansas in Monticello and married Elizabeth Mackall. Their daughter, Elan Mackall Goff, was born September 1, 1976. In 1977, he enlisted again in the Army and was assigned to the 4th Infantry Division (Mechanized) as a Private First Class, re-earning his sergeant's stripes in 1979. That same year, he joined the 75th Ranger Regiment, and after graduation from indoc, was reassigned to the 2nd Ranger Battalion on Fort Lewis, Washington.

After two years with the 2nd Ranger Battalion, Goff earned the rank of staff sergeant, and reenlisted on condition of reassignment to the Jungle Operations Training Center in Panama working as a small unit tactics instructor. He volunteered for the 1st Special Forces Operational Detachment-Delta (SFOD-D) during that assignment. After unit selection and training, Goff participated in operations in Guatemala, El Salvador, and Grenada (see Operation Urgent Fury).

He was reassigned to the staff and faculty at the United States Military Academy at West Point. He served as the NCOIC of the Service Orientation Course, and developed the Ranger Orientation Program that selected cadets to attend Ranger School during their Junior-Senior summer. He permitted his enlistment to expire in 1987 - working for a time training SWAT teams for the Department of Energy Y-12 nuclear weapon facility in Oak Ridge, Tennessee.

He rejoined the US Army in 1988, as a staff sergeant, and was assigned to the 1st Ranger Battalion.

Goff then volunteered for Special Forces training in 1989, and became a Special Operations Medical Sergeant assigned to the 7th Special Forces Group at Fort Bragg. While with 7th Group, he performed training and operational missions in Central and South America. Many of these missions were presented officially to the public as "counter-narcotics" operations supporting the war on drugs.

Goff was reassigned to the 75th Ranger Regiment as a Special Operations Medical Sergeant in 1993, and was attached to 3rd Ranger Battalion as part of Task Force Ranger for the operation in Mogadishu, Somalia. Not long after, he was promoted to Master Sergeant, effectively changing his job description from Special Forces Medic to SF Operations Sergeant.

Goff was then reassigned back to Fort Bragg, to the 3rd Special Forces Group, where he was given the task of running ODA 354, a military free-fall parachute specialty team.

== Activism against the Iraq War ==
Goff is referred to in Mary Tillman's book, Boots on the Ground by Dusk” as being a major influence and assistance in getting to the truth behind the death of former NFL player Pat Tillman.

After the publication of Full Spectrum Disorder, Goff became interested in the connections between militarism and the social construction of masculinity. He studied feminist writings and theory over the next two years in the process of writing his third book, Sex & War (Lulu Press, 2006).

== Books by Goff ==
- (2000) Hideous Dream. Soft Skull Press. ISBN 9781887128636
- (2004) Full-Spectrum Disorder. CreateSpace Publishing. ISBN 9781932360127
- (2006) Energy War - Exterminism. Publisher: Stan Goff (Std Copyright). ASIN B002EVQC8C
- (2006) Sex & War. Lulu Press Publishers. ISBN 9781411643802
- (2015) Borderline - Reflections on War, Sex, and Church. Cascade Books Publishers. ISBN 9781625644855
- (2018) Mammon's Ecology - Metaphysic of the Empty Sign. Cascade Books ISBN 9781532617683
- (2019) "Tough Gynes - Violent Women in Film as Honorary Men". Cascade Books ISBN 9781532617683

== Filmography ==
- Hijacking Catastrophe (2004), interviewee
- Leave No Soldier (2008), interviewee
- The Tillman Story (2010), interviewee
