= Left–right paradigm =

The left–right paradigm is a concept from political sciences and anthropology which proposes that societies have a tendency to divide themselves into ideological opposites. Important contributions to the theory of the paradigm were made by British social anthropologist Rodney Needham, who saw it as a basic human classifying device. It shares affinity with the cultural "romantic-classic" paradigm.

The term is used to analyze political discourse since the 19th century. It has, however, been suggested that in the 21st century the paradigm will become less useful as a tool of social and political analysis; some of the major current issues (such as population growth, individual liberties and biological warfare) cannot be said to allow for either a left- or right-wing perspective.

== The left–right paradigm as political criticism ==
Used in another context, the phrase refers to a political theory that alleges that members of opposing major political parties such as the Republican and Democratic parties in the United States share common interests and goals, as well as a covertly unified ruling authority over the political issues of the masses. The two major political entities act in concert to create divisiveness among the population while keeping control of the political spectrum.

This "left–right paradigm" concept theorizes that the two opposing political parties utilize their tremendous hold over mainstream media to dramatize political distractions and engage in covert warfare and operations, in grand performances of bureaucratic rivalry meant to propagandize and divide the populace. Divisive issues are purposefully fed through the major media outlets to divert attention away from the ruling class's hidden and ulterior (and sometimes global) agendas. By drawing attention to the differences between the two embedded political systems, ideologies, races and classes, the political groups obscure political clarity and divide unity among the masses. The tactic creates confusion and frustration among the population, which enables the ruling class to increase and consolidate their wealth and power through maintaining an illusion of a two-party system of checks and balances that actually works. The theory contends that the fresh interjection of a new political party or group (such as the expanding Libertarian or Green parties) into the political arena, would be the only way to provide a means to break the cyclical paradigm, currently established in the political system.

== False left–right paradigm political theory ==
The "false left–right paradigm" is the political theory that members of opposing political parties such as Republican and Democrat deceptively share common interests and goals, as a one body ruling authority over the masses. The two parties act to create divisiveness and influence the general population while keeping control of the political spectrum. The false left–right paradigm political theory is closely related to theory of Inverted totalitarianism and Managed Democracy.

The false left–right paradigm theorizes that opposing political groups use their influence over the establishment media to dramatize party warfare distraction, in grand performances of bureaucratic rivalry meant to propagandize and divide the populace. Psychological deception is coordinated on all levels of politics and fed through controlled media outlets to divert attention away from the ruling class's hidden agendas. By drawing attention to differences between two political systems, ideologies, races, and classes, the political groups obscure and divide unity among the masses. The tactic creates confusion and frustration among the population, enabling the global elite to increase and consolidate their wealth and power through maintaining an illusion of a two-party system of checks and balances.

Former Council on Foreign Relations (CFR) archivist and Georgetown University professor Carroll Quigley, who is known as being President Bill Clinton's mentor, wrote in his 1966 book "Tragedy and Hope"—

"The argument that the two parties should represent opposed ideals and policies, one, perhaps, of the Right and the other of the Left, is a foolish idea acceptable only to the doctrinaire and academic thinkers."

"Instead, the two parties should be almost identical, so the American people can 'throw the rascals out' at any election without leading to any profound or extreme shifts in policy."

== See also ==
- Left–right politics

== Bibliography ==
- Needham, Rodney (1973). Right and Left: Essays in Dual Symbolic Classification. University of Chicago Press.
