= Medea Benjamin =

American political activist and author (born 1952)

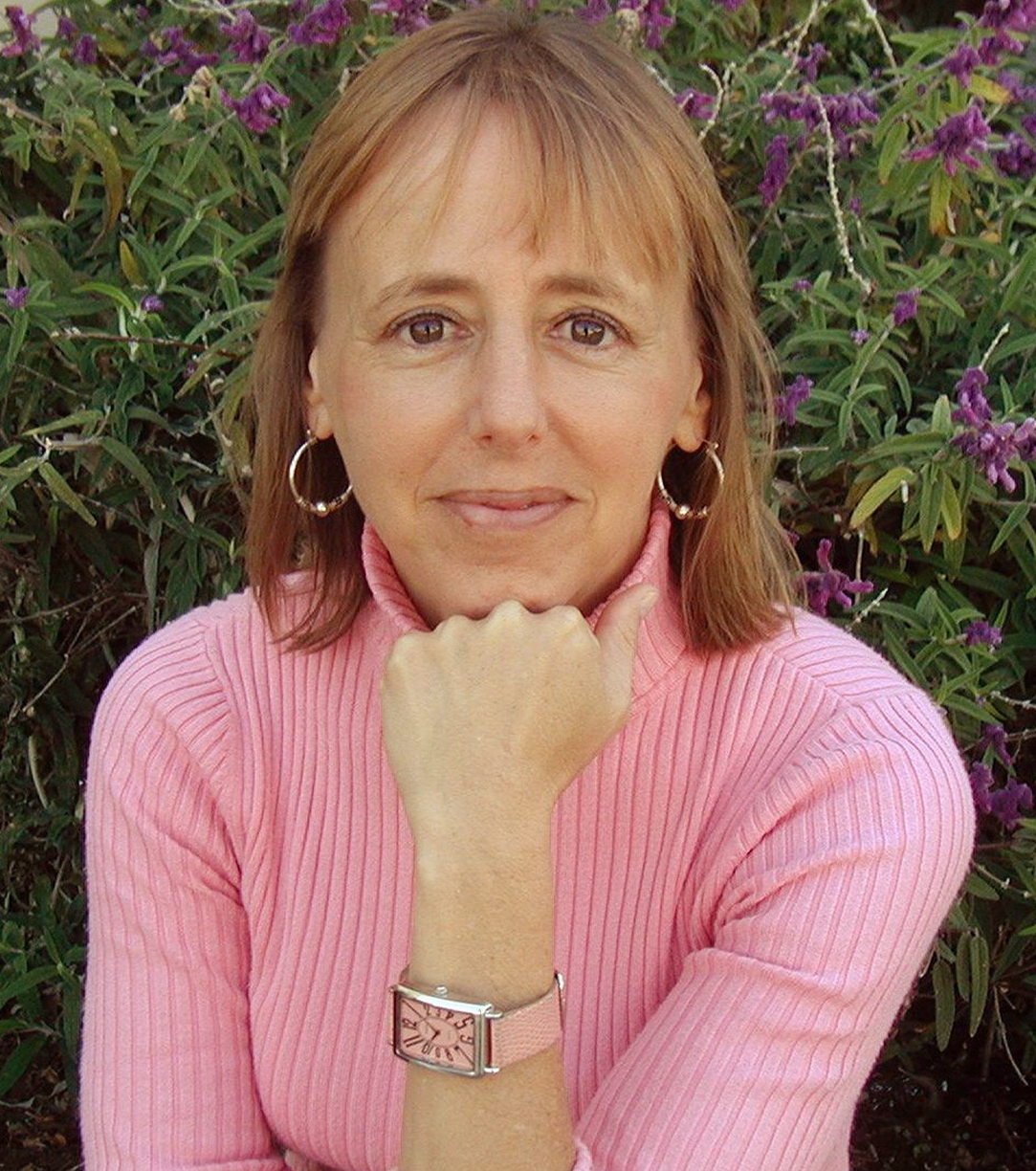
- Benjamin in 2007
- Born: Susan Benjamin; September 10, 1952 (age 74); Freeport, New York, U.S.
- Education: Tufts University; Columbia University; New School for Social Research
- Occupations: Political activist, author
- Spouse: Kevin Danaher
- Children: 2

Medea Benjamin (born Susan Benjamin on September 10, 1952) is an American political activist who, along with Jodie Evans and others, co-founded Code Pink. She also co-founded, along with her then husband Kevin Danaher, the fair trade advocacy group Global Exchange. Benjamin was the Green Party nominee in the 2000 United States Senate election in California, running under the name Medea Susan Benjamin. She finished in third place with 326,828 votes (3.1%).

== Early life ==
Medea Benjamin was born Susan Benjamin on September 10, 1952, daughter of Alvin and Rose Benjamin. She grew up in Freeport, New York, on Long Island, and is of Jewish descent. Her father, Alvin Benjamin (1920–2012), was a wealthy real estate developer and president of The Benjamin Companies.

During her first year at Tufts University, she renamed herself after the Greek mythological character Medea. Samuel Moyn wrote that Benjamin "liked how the name sounded, and she had heard a feminist interpretation of the Greek tragedy suggesting that Medea had never killed her children and was only blamed for it by patriarchal traditions".

She also joined the Students for a Democratic Society. Later she dropped out of school and hitchhiked through Europe and Africa, teaching English classes to earn money. She later returned to the United States and received master's degrees in public health from Columbia University and in economics from The New School. Benjamin worked for ten years as an economist and nutritionist in Latin America and Africa for the United Nations Food and Agriculture Organization, the World Health Organization, the Swedish International Development Agency, and the Institute for Food and Development Policy.

== Career ==
=== Organizations ===
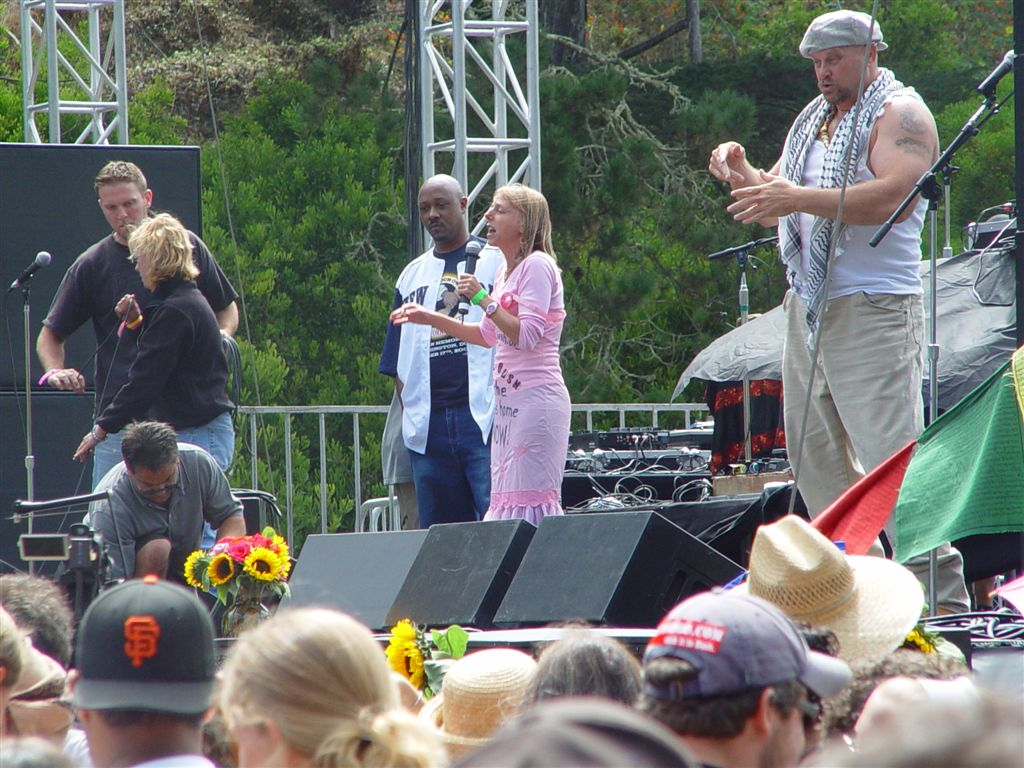
Benjamin speaking at a Code Pink rally in 2004.

In 1988, with her then-husband, Kevin Danaher, and Kirsten Moller, Benjamin co-founded the San Francisco-based Global Exchange, which advocates fair trade alternatives to what she describes as corporate globalization. In 2002, with Jodie Evans and others, she co-founded the feminist anti-war group Code Pink: Women for Peace, which advocated for an end to the Iraq War, the prevention of future wars, and social justice. Benjamin has been involved with the anti-war organization United for Peace and Justice.

She later created the Occupation Watch Center in Baghdad (IOWC) to monitor the United States military and the war's effect on civilian populations. Through this center, she brought U.S. military family members to see the conditions under which enlisted personnel served, and to speak out against the war, in Congress and at the United Nations, in 2003.

She is a member of the Board of Directors of Liberty Tree.

=== Politics ===
In 2000, Benjamin ran as a Green Party candidate challenging incumbent US Senator from California, Dianne Feinstein. She advocated for a living wage, universal healthcare, and delaying genetically engineered foods. During the campaign, Benjamin and her Republican rival Tom Campbell participated in joint events, including a joint press conference, touting their opposition to Feinstein (but also disagreeing with each other on many issues). Benjamin garnered 99,716 votes, 74%, in the Green Party primary, and 326,828 votes, 3.08%, of the general election total ballots. Since then, she has remained active in the Green Party and has also supported efforts by the Progressive Democrats of America.

In 2015, the Green Party created a shadow cabinet, naming Benjamin as the shadow Secretary of State.

== Protest actions ==
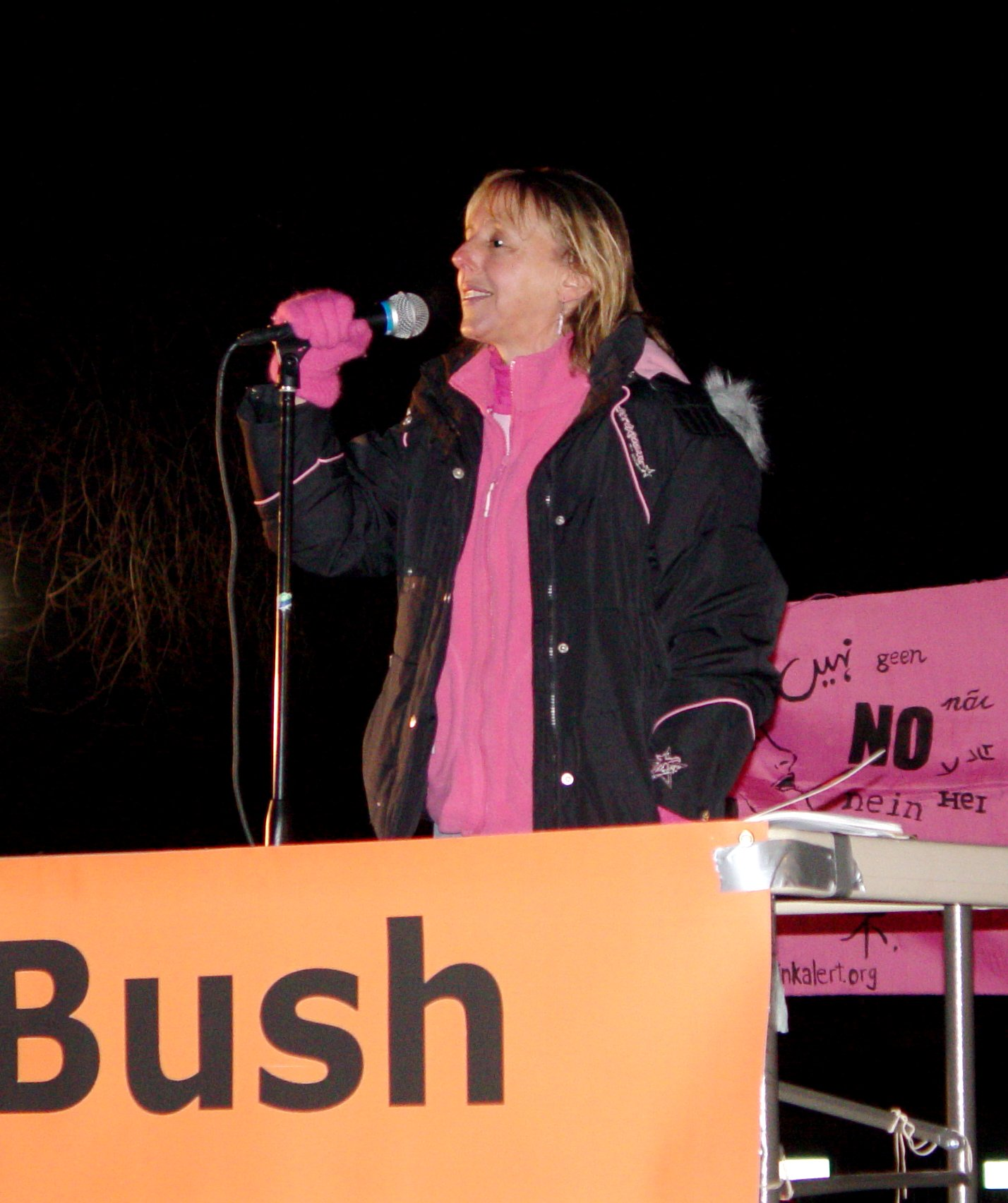
Benjamin speaks at a rally during the 2007 State of the Union Address in Washington, D.C.

From 2002 to 2009, Benjamin engaged in numerous protests involving members of the Bush administration (Secretary of Defense Donald Rumsfeld; President George W. Bush; Secretary of State Condoleezza Rice); Iraqi Prime Minister Nouri al-Maliki, and others. Benjamin engaged in protest actions at the 2004 Democratic National Convention and the 2004 Republican National Convention. On December 4, 2007, she was arrested by plainclothes police in Lahore, Pakistan, detained by the ISI for eight hours, and deported after protesting the house arrest of lawyers (including Aitzaz Ahsan). In 2009, Benjamin joined the steering committee for the Gaza Freedom March. In February 2012, Benjamin was arrested and deported for illegal entry to Bahrain and her participation in an illegal protest.

During 2005–2010, she worked to oppose United States threats of a possible impending war with Iran, including lobbying Congress, taking peace delegations to Iran, and bringing Iranian youth to Congress.

Benjamin repeatedly interrupted a major speech by President Barack Obama regarding United States policy in the war on terror at the National Defense University on May 23, 2013. After Benjamin was removed for her actions, President Obama then went off script. "The voice of that woman is worth paying attention to," he said. "Obviously I do not agree with much of what she said. And obviously she wasn't listening to me and much of what I said. But these are tough issues. And the suggestion that we can gloss over them is wrong." Benjamin responded by telling The Daily Beast, "If he had indeed made significant policy changes, I wasn't going to say anything. I would have preferred that option, but given that he didn't make those kind of changes I was looking for, I was glad to be given the opportunity to speak out."

On July 21, 2016, Benjamin heckled Donald Trump's acceptance speech at the Republican National Convention with a sign that read "Build bridges not walls".

In 2024, Benjamin joined other activists on the 2024 Gaza freedom flotilla.

She joined other activists through her CodePink group on the March 2025 Nuestra America ("Our America") flotilla to bring humanitarian aid to Cuba that was suffering increased economic crisis after the US capture of Venezuelan president Nicolás Maduro and the subsequent cut off of oil shipments from Venezuela.

In early 2026, Benjamin and CodePink joined international activists to bring humanitarian aid to Cuba. Some weeks later, the Trump administration's Treasury Department subpoenaed Benjamin and fellow visitor, leftist streamer and political pundit Hasan Piker, about their trip.

== Organization efforts ==
=== Labor rights and corporate responsibility ===
During the 1990s, Benjamin focused on countering what she believed was unfair trade as promoted by the World Trade Organization. She participated in an anti-sweatshop movement, initiating campaigns against Nike and clothing companies such as the GAP. In 1999, Benjamin helped expose the problem of indentured servitude among garment workers in the United States territory of Saipan (the Marianas Islands), which led to a billion-dollar lawsuit against 17 United States retailers. In 1999, she produced the documentary Sweating for a T-Shirt about the sweatshop industry.

During the World Trade Organization meeting in Seattle in December 1999, Benjamin's organization, Global Exchange, helped organize the 1999 Seattle WTO protests.

In 2000, she helped a campaign to pressure Starbucks to carry fair trade coffee in all their cafes. In October 2000, Starbucks introduced whole bean Fair Trade Certified coffee at more than 2,300 stores.

For 2001, Benjamin focused on California's energy crisis, assisting low-income ratepayers and small businesses. She headed a coalition of consumer, environmental, union and business leaders working for clean and affordable power under public control.

In September 2003, Benjamin was in Cancún, Mexico challenging the policies of the World Trade Organization (WTO) and in November, she was in Miami protesting the proposed Free Trade Area of the Americas (FTAA) while trying to bring attention to global peace and economic justice movements.

After several fact-finding visits to China, Benjamin co-sponsored with the International Labor Rights Fund an initiative to improve the labor and environmental practices of United States multinationals in China. The ensuring Human Rights Principles for US Businesses in China have been endorsed by major companies such as Cisco, Intel, Reebok, Levi Strauss and Mattel.

=== Israel-Palestine ===
In 2006, Benjamin organized humanitarian aid for war refugees in Lebanon and spoke out against Israeli bombing. In 2008 during the Gaza War and Israeli invasion of Gaza, she organized a daily protest at the hotel where President-elect Barack Obama was staying, and then visited Gaza to see the immediate effects of the bombing. She brought humanitarian aid and helped put together six other delegations to Gaza. She was one of the lead organizers of the Gaza Freedom March, where 1,350 people from dozens of countries came together in Cairo to try to march to Gaza. Benjamin criticized the United States government for passing legislation to send Israel $3 billion in aid, lobbied Congress and sailed on the U.S. Flotilla to Gaza in November 2011. Days after Israel launched its Pillar of Defense operation targeting sites in Gaza during November 2012, Benjamin led a delegation to deliver medical supplies to the Shifa hospital and the Palestinian Red Crescent in Gaza. She also helped to organize an annual gathering in Washington, D.C., with the objective of exposing the "negative influence" of the United States lobby group American-Israel Public Affairs Committee (AIPAC).

In January 2018, it was announced that activists from 20 American groups, including Code Pink, were banned from entering Israel because of their support for the Boycott, Divestment and Sanctions (BDS) movement. The Algemeiner reported in April 2014 that Benjamin's charitable foundation, which was worth $12 million, had shareholdings in Caterpillar, a company targeted by the BDS movement, as well as the oil company Chevron and the tobacco conglomerate Phillip Morris.

In November 2023, Benjamin conducted an ambush interview with US Senator Marco Rubio, and asked him if he would "call for a ceasefire in Gaza." Rubio responded "No I will not. On the contrary, … I want Israel to destroy every element of Hamas they can get their hands on."

=== Iraq ===
After the United States invaded Iraq in 2003, she created the Occupation Watch Center in Baghdad to monitor the United States military and the war's effect on civilian populations. Through this center she brought Iraqi women to the United States to speak about the occupation, organized delegations of U.S. military family members to see the conditions of their children serving in Iraq, and documented United States abuses, including at Abu Ghraib prison before the scandal involving it broke in the United States media. She also organized medical aid delegations to Iraq to civilians harmed by the United States military. She testified in Congress and the United Nations against the Iraq War.

In 2005, she was involved in the Hammering Halliburton campaign which was concerned with the abuses of United States military contractors such as Halliburton, the goal of which was to expose the awarding of corrupt no-bid contracts to corporations with close ties to the Bush administration. Along with this, Benjamin also exposed Blackwater Worldwide's illegal activities, including protests at the headquarters of the International Association of War Contractors. She was arrested outside the home of Blackwater's CEO.

In opposition to indefinite detention in Guantanamo, in 2007, Benjamin organized a delegation of prisoners' family members to Guantanamo Naval Base prison camp in Cuba, demanding its closing. In 2007 as well, she continued to protest weekly outside the Justice Department concerning water boarding and indefinite detention, and called for the resignation of Attorney General Alberto Gonzales. She was arrested many times for disrupting Congressional hearings.

On October 31, 2009, Benjamin led a group of Code Pink protestors at a protest aimed at military families queued up for a White House Halloween Party hosted by President Obama and First Lady Michelle Obama. The event raised controversy when a Reuters News photo showing the protesters (dressed as wounded soldiers), including one identified as Benjamin, were described as "taunting" the children.

=== Drones ===
In 2009, Benjamin began her efforts to bring attention to the effects of drone warfare, participating in demonstrations at United States bases where drones are piloted and at headquarters of drone manufacturers. On April 28, 2012, in Washington, D.C., she was responsible for organizing the first International Drone Summit with lawyers, scientists, academics, and activists to kick off an international campaign to rein in the use of drones in the U.S. and abroad.

On April 30, 2012, Benjamin interrupted a speech on United States counterterrorism strategy given by John Brennan at the Woodrow Wilson Center, to ask about civilians' casualties of US drone strikes in Pakistan, Somalia, and Yemen.

In October 2012, she organized a 34-person delegation to Pakistan to protest U.S. drone warfare. While in Pakistan she allegedly met with drone victims, family members, lawyers, academics, women's groups, and Pakistani leaders, as well as the U.S. Ambassador to Pakistan. The delegation made international headlines when they joined a caravan to Waziristan organized by prominent political leader and former Pakistani cricket captain Imran Khan, a staunch opponent of American involvement in Pakistan. (See CNN video, The New York Times, The Washington Post, Al Jazeera, the BBC, and more than 100 major news outlets, September 28 – October 14, 2012). She also organized a public fast in Islamabad in sympathy with alleged drone victims.

In 2012, she authored Drone Warfare: Killing by Remote Control, published by OR Books, and toured the country speaking out against drone warfare.

=== Other campaigns ===
As part of Code Pink's mission, Benjamin helped organize many International Women's Day Marches and Mother's Day Calls for Peace, the latter to bring back the original intent of Mother's Day as women mobilizing against war. These included bringing women from war torn countries such as Iraq, Palestine and Afghanistan to the U.S. to speak about their experiences. Between 2003 and 2010, Benjamin helped organize anti-war mass mobilizations in Washington, D.C., New York City and San Francisco.

Benjamin organized the campaign Bring Our War Dollars Home, which fought to divert money from the Pentagon into social programs at home.

=== WTO protest violence ===
During the 1999 anti-globalization movement protests against the WTO in Seattle, a quote from Benjamin was published by The New York Times, which implied that she was calling for the arrest of those who destroyed property during the protests. Benjamin later clarified that, while she did not approve of the tactics of destroying property, she did not want the arrest of those responsible.

=== Anybody But Bush ===
Benjamin has been criticized by some Greens for her support for "Anybody But Bush" in 2004. Explaining why she supported this movement, she said that "maybe it's time for the people who voted for Bush in 2000, the people who didn't vote at all in 2000, and yes, people like myself who voted for Ralph Nader in 2000, to admit our mistakes. I'll say mine — I had no idea that George Bush would be such a disastrous president. Had I known then what I know now, and had I lived in a swing state, I would have voted for Gore instead of Ralph Nader."

Todd Chretien, a member of the International Socialist Organization, responded:

Medea Benjamin ... and many other liberal and progressive leaders tell us that a Kerry regime "would be less dangerous" than Bush ... But, even if Kerry is "less dangerous", he will be more capable of wreaking havoc on Iraq, Palestine, Venezuela, abortion, gay rights, civil rights and unions if we sacrifice our political movement to getting behind him ... any movement that ever aims to win, must learn to stand up for itself precisely when it is darkest.

=== Views on United States involvement in the Middle East ===
Benjamin writes in The Huffington Post that the U.S. needs to end military interventionism and that the "U.S. military should close all foreign military bases and use our soldiers to protect us here at home."

Benjamin also writes in The Huffington Post that the United States never had any "justification for invading Iraq", that there is no "justification for continuing the war in Afghanistan", and that in Pakistan, the United States "drone attacks are only fueling the violence and creating more Osama bin Ladens". Regarding the killing of bin Laden, she says: "Let us not sink into a false sense of triumphalism in the wake of Bin Laden's passing."

=== Arrest In Egypt ===
On March 3, 2014, Benjamin was arrested in Egypt. She had flown there en route to participating in a women's conference in the Palestinian territory of Gaza. Upon her arrival at Cairo International Airport, Benjamin was detained by airport police and held overnight, during which time she said she was assaulted by police officers, resulting in a broken arm and a dislocated shoulder. She was later deported to Turkey. Questions arose regarding the role of the United States Embassy in her detention, as embassy spokesman Mofid Deak said that Benjamin left the country following assistance from the embassy, while Code Pink's Alli McCracken said the embassy did not help Benjamin.

=== Venezuela ===
In 2006, Benjamin said that it was a myth that Venezuelan President Hugo Chávez had limited freedom of speech and eroded civil rights in Venezuela. In May 2007, Benjamin appeared as a guest on talk-show host Tucker Carlson's show, which was then part of MSNBC's schedule. Carlson criticized Benjamin for her statement and asked her: "Do you want to revise that given the news that Hugo Chávez has closed the last nationally broadcast opposition television station for criticizing him?" Benjamin replied that Chávez had not renewed the license of RCTV because the station "participated in a coup against a democratically elected government, his [Chavez's] government". Benjamin also said: "Peru recently did not renew a license. Uruguay didn't renew a license. Why do you hold Venezuela to a different standard?"

Carlson responded that a 360-page Venezuelan government-published book accused RCTV of showing lack of respect for authorities and institutions. Carlson asked Benjamin: "I would think, as a self-described liberal, you would stand up for the right of people to 'challenge authorities and institutions.' And yet you are apologizing for the squelching of minority views. Why could that be?" Benjamin replied: "They [RCTV] falsified information. They got people out on the street. They falsified footage that showed pro-Chavez supporters killing people, which did not happen. They refuse to cover any of the pro-Chavez demonstrations."

In January 2019, in a Democracy Now! interview, Benjamin said she was against "US intervention in Venezuela", which had the potential to "create a civil war leading to tremendous violence".

In April and May 2019, Benjamin was part of an "Embassy Protection Collective" formed by groups that include CodePink, ANSWER Coalition, Poor People's Army, People's Power Assembly, Revolutionary Alliance and Popular Resistance, which occupied the Venezuelan Embassy in Washington. Benjamin said the group had the permission of the Maduro government to stay in the embassy.

=== Arc of Justice ===
The Arc of Justice was a charity founded by Benjamin that donates money to Code Pink and other left-wing organizations. In August 2026 the Attorney General of the state of California ordered the non-profit to cease all operations after failing to file taxes for three years and account for more than fifty one million in missing assets. Benjamin ran Arc of Justice while serving as the treasurer for Code Pink. The organization reportedly funded Code Pink with more than two million dollars from 2009 until 2022.

== Awards ==
In 2010, Benjamin received the Martin Luther King Jr. Peace Prize from the Fellowship of Reconciliation. In 2012, she won the Marjorie Kellogg National Peacemaker Award and the Thomas Merton Center Peace Award. Also in 2012, she was awarded The US Peace Prize "in recognition of her creative leadership on the front lines of the antiwar movement", and in 2014 the organization she founded, Code Pink, received the same prize. In 2014, she received the Gandhi Peace Award from Promoting Enduring Peace "to honor her for her unyielding advocacy for social justice of more than 30 years". In 2016, she received the Humanist Heorine Award from the American Humanist Association.

In 2003, the Los Angeles Times described her as "one of the high profile leaders" of the peace movement.

== Criticism and incidents ==
In 2014, Benjamin attended the second annual New Horizon conference in Tehran. The Anti-Defamation League criticized Benjamin for attending the conference. Benjamin responded saying she was "uncomfortable" with many of the attendees but learned a lot and had nothing to apologize for.

== Personal life ==
Benjamin has been married twice. Her second marriage is to activist Kevin Danaher. She has two daughters, Maya Danaher and Arlen Gomez, who respectively serve as treasurer and secretary of the Benjamin Fund, an organization for which she serves as president.

Benjamin lives in Washington, D.C., and in San Francisco.

== Books ==
- Benjamin, Medea; Freedman, Andrea (1989). Bridging the Global Gap: A Handbook to Linking Citizens of the First and Third Worlds. Global Exchange / Seven Locks Press. ISBN 0-932020-73-9.
- Benjamin, Medea; Collins, Joseph; Scott, Michael (1989). No Free Lunch: Food and Revolution in Cuba Today. Princeton University Press. ISBN 0-935028-52-8.
- Benjamin, Medea (1989). Don't Be Afraid, Gringo: A Honduran Woman Speaks From The Heart: The Story of Elvia Alvarado. Harper Perennial. ISBN 0-06-097205-X.
- Benjamin, Medea; Rossett, Peter (1995). Greening of the Revolution: Cuba's Experiment with Organic Agriculture. Ocean Press. ISBN 1-875284-80-X.
- Benjamin, Medea; Antonio Blanco, Juan (1996). Cuba: Talking About Revolution: Conversations with Juan Antonio Blanco. Inner Ocean Publishing. ISBN 1-875284-97-4.
- Benjamin, Medea; da Silva, Benedita; Mendonca, Maisa (1997). Benedita Da Silva: An Afro-Brazilian Woman's Story of Politics and Love. Institute for Food and Development Policy. ISBN 0-935028-70-6.
- Benjamin, Medea; Rodolfo-Sioson, Miya (1997). The Peace Corps and More: 175 Ways to Work, Study and Travel at Home & Abroad. Global Exchange / Seven Locks Press. ISBN 0-929765-04-4.
- Benjamin, Medea (2000). I, Senator: How, together, we transformed the state of California and the United States. Green Press.
- Benjamin, Medea; Evans, Jodie, eds. (2005). How to Stop the Next War Now: Effective Responses to Violence and Terrorism. Inner Ocean Publishing. ISBN 1-930722-49-4.
- Benjamin, Medea (2012). Drone Warfare: Killing by Remote Control. OR Books. ISBN 978-1-935928-81-2.
- Benjamin, Medea (2016). Kingdom of the Unjust: Behind the U.S. – Saudi Connection. OR Books. ISBN 978-1-682190-46-3.
- Benjamin, Medea (2018). inside Iran: The Real History and Politics of the Islamic Republic of Iran. OR Books. ISBN 978-1-682191-40-8.
- Benjamin, Medea; Davies, Nicolas J. S. (2022). War in Ukraine: Making Sense of a Senseless Conflict. OR Books. ISBN 978-1-68219-371-6.
- Benjamin, Medea; Swanson, David (2024). NATO: What You Need to Know. OR Books. ISBN 978-1682195208.

== See also ==
- List of peace activists
