= Khalil Bendib =

American cartoonist

Khalil Bendib in 2007

Khalil Bendib (born Paris, France) is an Algerian American fine artist and political cartoonist.

== Biography ==
Born during the Algerian revolution, Bendib spent 3 years in Morocco before returning to Algeria aged 6. After receiving his bachelor's degree in Algiers, he left Algeria at the age of 20. He currently resides in Berkeley, California.

Bendib became a professional political cartoonist and sculptor/ceramicist after earning his master's degree at the University of Southern California in 1982. His early political cartoons were published in the USC Daily Trojan newspaper.

In 1995, Bendib resigned a position he had held working for Gannett Newspapers (based at the San Bernardino Sun).

Largely utilizing the internet, Bendib now distributes his political cartoons independently to alternative media outlets outside of the corporate mainstream media. By August 2007, when his first book, Mission Accomplished: Wicked Cartoons by America's Most Wanted Political Cartoonist, was published,

His work has been featured by the Institute for Policy Studies on its web site.

In addition to his work as a cartoonist, Bendib also co-hosts a weekly one-hour radio program called Voices of the Middle East and North Africa on Pacifica Radio station KPFA (94.1 FM), in Berkeley, California. He also continues to exhibit his sculptures and ceramics.

In 2008, Bendib ran a spoof campaign for President of the United States, claiming to be the first Muslim-American candidate. However, Randall A. Venson, an actual candidate, preceded him in 2000.

== Bibliography ==
- Mission Accomplished: Wicked Cartoons by America's Most Wanted Political Cartoonist, Olive Branch Press/Interlink Books, 2007
- Verax: The True History of Whistleblowers, Drone Warfare, and Mass Surveillance: A Graphic Novel, (with Pratap Chatterjee) Metropolitan Books, 2017
- It Became Necessary to Destroy the Planet in Order to Save It!: Truly Subversive Editorial Cartoons, Plan 9 Publishing, 2003
