= The People's Forum =

American nonprofit organization

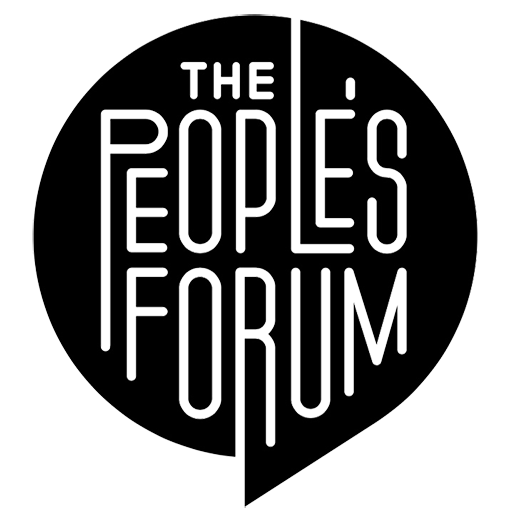
- Formation: 2017
- Founder: Manolo De Los Santos
- Type: Nonprofit
- Headquarters: Manhattan, New York City
- Board members: Jodie Evans, Claudia De La Cruz
- Budget: $13.6 million (2021)
- Staff: 15
- Website: peoplesforum.org

The People's Forum is an American nonprofit organization founded in 2017. It is based in Manhattan and describes itself as a "movement incubator" which promotes social equality and economic equality across the world. The organization serves as a gathering place for more than 200 left-wing groups, providing them with workspace.

The People's Forum organized multiple protests against Immigration and Customs Enforcement and Gaza war. Ways and Means Committee, chaired by Representative Jason Smith, suspected the organization of being an agent of the Chinese Communist Party in 2025 because it received funds of American businessman Neville Roy Singham, who is allegedly affiliated with the CCP.

== History ==
The People's Forum was founded in 2017 and is based in Manhattan. It described itself as a "movement incubator" which promotes social equality and economic equality across the world. The organization was founded by Manolo De Los Santos, an activist who met with President of Venezuela Nicholas Maduro in 2021.

The organization serves as a gathering place for more than 200 left-wing groups in Its Manhattan building, offering workspaces such as a conference room, theater, library and a media laboratory. The organization's headquarters also houses a coffee shop called "The People's Cafe". According to the People's Dispatch, The People's Forum organized solidarity campaigns with Cuba and gatherings of socialist organizers. It has provided workspaces for protest groups such as Palestinian Youth Movement and Code Pink, as well as political organizations such as the Democratic Socialists of America and the Party for Socialism and Liberation. The People's Forum is a member of International Peoples’ Assembly.

According to The Free Press, since the founding of The People's Forum, its main donor has been American businessman Neville Roy Singham, who, together with his wife Jodie Evans, donated $20.4 million to the organization from 2017 to 2022. In 2021, The People's Forum employed 15 people and owned $13.6 million worth of assets. That year, the organization acknowledged Singham's support, calling him its "Marxist comrade”. Jodie Evans serves on organization's board along with activist Claudia De La Cruz. In 2022, The People's Forum granted office space to news agency BreakThrough News and Justice and Education Fund, both backed by Singham. Documents of BreakThrough News showed that it operates from the headquarters of The People's Forum.

== Activity ==
=== Protests ===
The People's Forum held a protest in New York City one day after the October 7 attacks. The Times of Israel said that protesters "applauded" the attacks. In November 2023, the organization took part in National March on Washington: Free Palestine along with ANSWER Coalition. In March 2024, pro-Palestine protest groups held meetings in the offices The People's Forum in New York City.

In March 2025, the organization held an event at New York Society for Ethical Culture, calling for the release of activist Mahmoud Khalil who was detained by Immigration and Customs Enforcement. The event was hosted by Manolo De Los Santos. On April 5, 2025, the organization held a memorial event in memory of the Palestinian children killed during the Gaza War, displaying 17,000 pairs of children's shoes on Pennsylvania Avenue.

On January 6, 2026, The People's Forum organized protests in New York City against the detention of Nicolas Maduro. One of the protests organized by The People's Forum took place near the Metropolitan Detention Center in Brooklyn, where protesters chanted: “No more coups, no more wars, Latin America isn't yours”. On January 23, 2026, The People's Forum, together with 50501 movement and ANSWER Coalition, organized a protest against Immigration and Customs Enforcement in New York City, which was attended by thousands of people. According to NewsNation, The People's Forum was one of the most prominent groups organizing anti-ICE protests in 2026.

=== Others ===
The People's Forum hosts classes and seminars in its headquarters, such as "Lenin and the Path to Revolution", which expresses support to countries like China and Cuba for having “smashed the shackles of Western imperialism”, and “Healthcare Under Siege and Apartheid”, which discusses discrimination in Israel and the genocide in Gaza. One of the organization's lecturers includes Marxist historian Vijay Prashad, who is a friend of Neville Roy Singham. The People's Forum has its own bookstore, which sells literature about various communist leaders. In addition, The People's Forum offers language courses, graphic design classes, and a program of art house films.

New Lines Magazine reported that one of The People's Forum's events in 2021 hosted marxist group Qiao Collective, which promotes Chinese government views, including denial of the Uyghur genocide. The magazine said The People's Forum along with Tricontinental "promote and amplify the narrative of Uyghur genocide denial".

== Allegations and investigation ==
In December 2024, Representatives Bruce Westerman and Paul Gosar sent a letter to Manolo De Los Santos accusing The People's Forum of organizing violent protests and being tied to Hamas and Iran. On April 15, 2025, Senator Chuck Grassley sent a letter to Attorney General Pamela Bondi and FBI Director Kash Patel, accusing The People's Forum and Code Pink of being affiliated with Chinese Communist Party. Grassley said the organization should be asked to register as a foreign agent under the Foreign Agent Registration Act. The People’s Forum described the accusations as a "dangerous escalation to crush dissent".

In September 2025, Ways and Means Committee, chaired by Representative Jason Smith, launched an investigation into The People's Forum for allegedly being an agent of the Chinese Communist Party. Smith said that the organization is being suspected because it was financially supported by Neville Roy Singham and his wife, both allegedly affiliated with the CCP. He said the organization is abusing its tax-exempt status to spread pro-CCP propaganda. The People's Forum said the accusations are smear campaign and an attempt to "silence" the organization's work and "crush dissent".

On July 21, 2026, Ways and Means Committee sent Manolo De Los Santos a subpoena demanding documents, information on donors and grant recipients of The People's Forum. It also requested information about communications between the organization and Neville Roy Singham. Jason Smith said that the information will “expose" how tax laws have been "exploited to advance the CCP’s influence operations". De Los Santos called the subpoena a “wholesale political attack on free speech". Workers union 32BJ SEIU, along with dozens of progressive groups, released a statement condemning the investigation of the organization as an attack on free speech. The statement was signed by 71 groups, including New York Civil Liberties Union, Jewish Voice for Peace, NAACP Legal Defense Fund and New York City Democratic Socialists of America.
