= Langeberg Local Municipality elections =

The council of the Langeberg Local Municipality (formerly the Breede River/Winelands Local Municipality) consists of twenty-three members elected by mixed-member proportional representation. Twelve councillors are elected by first-past-the-post voting in twelve wards, while the remaining eleven are chosen from party lists so that the total number of party representatives is proportional to the number of votes received.

In the election of 4 November 2026 the Democratic Alliance (DA) obtained a plurality of nine seats.

== Results ==
The following table shows the composition of the council after past elections.

| Event | ANC | DA | FF+ | PA | PDM | Other | Total |
|---|---|---|---|---|---|---|---|
| 2000 election | 7 | 9 | — | — | — | 3 | 19 |
| 2002 floor-crossing | 8 | 11 | — | — | — | 0 | 19 |
| 2006 election | 9 | 6 | — | — | 1 | 4 | 20 |
| 2011 election | 7 | 11 | — | — | 1 | 4 | 23 |
| 2016 election | 6 | 12 | 0 | — | 1 | 4 | 23 |
| 2021 election | 6 | 10 | 3 | 1 | 1 | 2 | 23 |
| 2026 election | 4 | 9 | 2 | 4 | 0 | 4 | 23 |

== December 2000 election ==
The following table shows the results of the 2000 election.

| Party | Ward | | | List | | | Total seats |
| Party | Votes | % | Seats | Votes | % | Seats | Total seats |
|---|---|---|---|---|---|---|---|
| Democratic Alliance | 7,393 | 43.72 | 5 | 7,799 | 46.09 | 4 | 9 |
| African National Congress | 6,088 | 36.01 | 4 | 6,275 | 37.09 | 3 | 7 |
| Civic Alliance | 1,333 | 7.88 | 1 | 1,330 | 7.86 | 0 | 1 |
| People's Forum | 960 | 5.68 | 0 | 925 | 5.47 | 1 | 1 |
| Alliance for the Community | 652 | 3.86 | 0 | 591 | 3.49 | 1 | 1 |
| Independent candidates | 482 | 2.85 | 0 | | | | 0 |
| Total | 16,908 | 100.00 | 10 | 16,920 | 100.00 | 9 | 19 |
| Valid votes | 16,908 | 98.30 | | 16,920 | 98.18 | | |
| Invalid/blank votes | 293 | 1.70 | | 314 | 1.82 | | |
| Total votes | 17,201 | 100.00 | | 17,234 | 100.00 | | |
| Registered voters/turnout | 28,899 | 59.52 | | 28,899 | 59.64 | | |

=== By-elections from December 2000 to October 2002 ===
The following by-elections were held to fill vacant ward seats in the period between the election in December 2000 and the floor crossing period in October 2002.

| Date | Ward | Party of the previous councillor | Party of the newly elected councillor |
|---|---|---|---|
| 15 September 2001 | 3 | African National Congress | Democratic Alliance |

=== October 2002 floor crossing ===
In terms of the Eighth Amendment of the Constitution and the judgment of the Constitutional Court in United Democratic Movement v President of the Republic of South Africa and Others, in the period from 8–22 October 2002 councillors had the opportunity to cross the floor to a different political party without losing their seats. In the Breede River/Winelands council, one councillor crossed from the African National Congress (ANC) to the Democratic Alliance, while the single councillors for the Alliance for the Community, Civic Alliance and People's Forum all crossed to the ANC.

| Party | Seats before | Net change | Seats after |
|---|---|---|---|
| Democratic Alliance | 10 | ▲1 | 11 |
| African National Congress | 6 | ▲2 | 8 |
| Civic Alliance | 1 | ▼1 | 0 |
| People's Forum | 1 | ▼1 | 0 |
| Alliance for the Community | 1 | ▼1 | 0 |

=== By-elections from October 2002 to March 2006 ===
The following by-elections were held to fill vacant ward seats in the period between the floor crossing period in October 2002 and the election in March 2006.

| Date | Ward | Party of the previous councillor | Party of the newly elected councillor |
|---|---|---|---|
| 26 November 2003 | 8 | African National Congress | African National Congress (Note: Elected uncontested as no other candidates were nominated.) |
| 26 May 2004 | 4 | African National Congress | African National Congress |
| 28 July 2004 | 10 | African National Congress | African National Congress |

== March 2006 election ==
The following table shows the results of the 2006 election.

| Party | Ward | | | List | | | Total seats |
| Party | Votes | % | Seats | Votes | % | Seats | Total seats |
|---|---|---|---|---|---|---|---|
| African National Congress | 8,649 | 45.69 | 6 | 8,671 | 45.84 | 3 | 9 |
| Democratic Alliance | 5,849 | 30.90 | 4 | 5,777 | 30.54 | 2 | 6 |
| Independent Democrats | 2,634 | 13.91 | 0 | 2,759 | 14.59 | 3 | 3 |
| Western Cape Community | 543 | 2.87 | 0 | 546 | 2.89 | 1 | 1 |
| People's Democratic Movement | 491 | 2.59 | 0 | 434 | 2.29 | 1 | 1 |
| African Christian Democratic Party | 208 | 1.10 | 0 | 417 | 2.20 | 0 | 0 |
| Pan Africanist Congress of Azania | 187 | 0.99 | 0 | 169 | 0.89 | 0 | 0 |
| First Community Party of South Africa | 157 | 0.83 | 0 | 142 | 0.75 | 0 | 0 |
| Independent candidates | 213 | 1.13 | 0 | | | | 0 |
| Total | 18,931 | 100.00 | 10 | 18,915 | 100.00 | 10 | 20 |
| Valid votes | 18,931 | 98.45 | | 18,915 | 98.23 | | |
| Invalid/blank votes | 299 | 1.55 | | 340 | 1.77 | | |
| Total votes | 19,230 | 100.00 | | 19,255 | 100.00 | | |
| Registered voters/turnout | 34,915 | 55.08 | | 34,915 | 55.15 | | |

=== By-elections from March 2006 to May 2011 ===
The following by-elections were held to fill vacant ward seats in the period between the elections in March 2006 and May 2011.

| Date | Ward | Party of the previous councillor | Party of the newly elected councillor |
|---|---|---|---|
| 10 December 2008 | 10 | African National Congress | African National Congress |

== May 2011 election ==
On 28 August 2009, the Breede River/Winelands Local Municipality was renamed to the Langeberg Municipality.

The following table shows the results of the 2011 election.

| Party | Ward | | | List | | | Total seats |
| Party | Votes | % | Seats | Votes | % | Seats | Total seats |
|---|---|---|---|---|---|---|---|
| Democratic Alliance | 10,854 | 46.72 | 10 | 11,049 | 47.96 | 1 | 11 |
| African National Congress | 6,661 | 28.67 | 2 | 6,997 | 30.37 | 5 | 7 |
| Civic Independent | 1,403 | 6.04 | 0 | 1,405 | 6.10 | 2 | 2 |
| People's Democratic Movement | 1,111 | 4.78 | 0 | 1,067 | 4.63 | 1 | 1 |
| Western Cape Community | 600 | 2.58 | 0 | 630 | 2.73 | 1 | 1 |
| Congress of the People | 480 | 2.07 | 0 | 676 | 2.93 | 1 | 1 |
| Independent candidates | 962 | 4.14 | 0 | | | | 0 |
| Community Workers Forum | 261 | 1.12 | 0 | 244 | 1.06 | 0 | 0 |
| National People's Party | 224 | 0.96 | 0 | 190 | 0.82 | 0 | 0 |
| Civic Democrats | 122 | 0.53 | 0 | 179 | 0.78 | 0 | 0 |
| Democratic Christian Party | 159 | 0.68 | 0 | 140 | 0.61 | 0 | 0 |
| National Independent Civic Organisation | 152 | 0.65 | 0 | 138 | 0.60 | 0 | 0 |
| Dagga Party | 124 | 0.53 | 0 | 124 | 0.54 | 0 | 0 |
| South African Progressive Civic Organisation | 83 | 0.36 | 0 | 106 | 0.46 | 0 | 0 |
| United Independent Front | 35 | 0.15 | 0 | 94 | 0.41 | 0 | 0 |
| Total | 23,231 | 100.00 | 12 | 23,039 | 100.00 | 11 | 23 |
| Valid votes | 23,231 | 98.29 | | 23,039 | 97.47 | | |
| Invalid/blank votes | 405 | 1.71 | | 598 | 2.53 | | |
| Total votes | 23,636 | 100.00 | | 23,637 | 100.00 | | |
| Registered voters/turnout | 38,275 | 61.75 | | 38,275 | 61.76 | | |

=== By-elections from May 2011 to August 2016 ===
The following by-elections were held to fill vacant ward seats in the period between the elections in May 2011 and August 2016.

| Date | Ward | Party of the previous councillor | Party of the newly elected councillor |
|---|---|---|---|
| 6 May 2015 | 2 | African National Congress | African National Congress |
| 22 July 2015 | 10 | African National Congress | African National Congress |

== August 2016 election ==
The following table shows the results of the 2016 election.

| Party | Ward | | | List | | | Total seats |
| Party | Votes | % | Seats | Votes | % | Seats | Total seats |
|---|---|---|---|---|---|---|---|
| Democratic Alliance | 12,400 | 49.13 | 9 | 12,753 | 51.03 | 3 | 12 |
| African National Congress | 6,387 | 25.31 | 3 | 6,827 | 27.32 | 3 | 6 |
| People's Democratic Movement | 1,049 | 4.16 | 0 | 1,078 | 4.31 | 1 | 1 |
| Congress of the People | 1,063 | 4.21 | 0 | 977 | 3.91 | 1 | 1 |
| Langeberg Independent Party | 838 | 3.32 | 0 | 800 | 3.20 | 1 | 1 |
| Independent Civic Organisation of South Africa | 683 | 2.71 | 0 | 620 | 2.48 | 1 | 1 |
| Economic Freedom Fighters | 459 | 1.82 | 0 | 506 | 2.02 | 1 | 1 |
| Independent candidates | 910 | 3.61 | 0 | | | | 0 |
| Community and Workers Alliance | 420 | 1.66 | 0 | 390 | 1.56 | 0 | 0 |
| Civic Independent | 404 | 1.60 | 0 | 386 | 1.54 | 0 | 0 |
| Freedom Front Plus | 268 | 1.06 | 0 | 260 | 1.04 | 0 | 0 |
| Western Cape Community | 224 | 0.89 | 0 | 254 | 1.02 | 0 | 0 |
| Alliance for Democratic Freedom | 101 | 0.40 | 0 | 141 | 0.56 | 0 | 0 |
| Nationalist Coloured Party | 31 | 0.12 | 0 | | | | 0 |
| Total | 25,237 | 100.00 | 12 | 24,992 | 100.00 | 11 | 23 |
| Valid votes | 25,237 | 98.68 | | 24,992 | 97.99 | | |
| Invalid/blank votes | 337 | 1.32 | | 512 | 2.01 | | |
| Total votes | 25,574 | 100.00 | | 25,504 | 100.00 | | |
| Registered voters/turnout | 43,290 | 59.08 | | 43,290 | 58.91 | | |

The local council sends three representatives to the council of the Cape Winelands District Municipality: two from the Democratic Alliance and one from the African National Congress.

| Date | Ward | Party of the previous councillor | Party of the newly elected councillor |
|---|---|---|---|
| 9 December 2020 | 9 | Democratic Alliance | Democratic Alliance |

== November 2021 election ==
The following table shows the results of the 2021 election.

| Party | Ward | | | List | | | Total seats |
| Party | Votes | % | Seats | Votes | % | Seats | Total seats |
|---|---|---|---|---|---|---|---|
| Democratic Alliance | 8,536 | 41.98 | 9 | 9,090 | 44.75 | 1 | 10 |
| African National Congress | 5,129 | 25.22 | 3 | 5,190 | 25.55 | 3 | 6 |
| Freedom Front Plus | 2,168 | 10.66 | 0 | 2,033 | 10.01 | 3 | 3 |
| People's Democratic Movement | 796 | 3.91 | 0 | 806 | 3.97 | 1 | 1 |
| Patriotic Alliance | 525 | 2.58 | 0 | 501 | 2.47 | 1 | 1 |
| Good | 492 | 2.42 | 0 | 512 | 2.52 | 1 | 1 |
| Langeberg Independent Party | 307 | 1.51 | 0 | 395 | 1.94 | 1 | 1 |
| Economic Freedom Fighters | 332 | 1.63 | 0 | 351 | 1.73 | 0 | 0 |
| Independent Civic Organisation of South Africa | 324 | 1.59 | 0 | 328 | 1.61 | 0 | 0 |
| Congress of the People | 311 | 1.53 | 0 | 306 | 1.51 | 0 | 0 |
| Independent candidates | 588 | 2.89 | 0 | | | | 0 |
| African Christian Democratic Party | 207 | 1.02 | 0 | 228 | 1.12 | 0 | 0 |
| Youth Independence Party and Youth Associates | 197 | 0.97 | 0 | 203 | 1.00 | 0 | 0 |
| Compatriots of South Africa | 178 | 0.88 | 0 | 141 | 0.69 | 0 | 0 |
| Economic Liberation Congress | 108 | 0.53 | 0 | 94 | 0.46 | 0 | 0 |
| Cape Independence Party | 101 | 0.50 | 0 | 95 | 0.47 | 0 | 0 |
| The Organic Humanity Movement | 35 | 0.17 | 0 | 38 | 0.19 | 0 | 0 |
| Total | 20,334 | 100.00 | 12 | 20,311 | 100.00 | 11 | 23 |
| Valid votes | 20,334 | 99.07 | | 20,311 | 98.79 | | |
| Invalid/blank votes | 190 | 0.93 | | 249 | 1.21 | | |
| Total votes | 20,524 | 100.00 | | 20,560 | 100.00 | | |
| Registered voters/turnout | 43,599 | 47.07 | | 43,599 | 47.16 | | |

The DA then formed a majority coalition with the Freedom Front Plus (FF+) to govern the municipality.

The Democratic Alliance (DA) governed the council in coalition with the People's Democratic Movement (PDM) and Langeberg Independent Party (LIP).

=== By-elections (November 2021–present) ===
The following by-elections were held to fill vacant ward seats in the period from the election in November 2021.

| Date | Ward | Party of the previous councillor | Party of the newly elected councillor |
|---|---|---|---|
| 15 Oct 2025 | 4 | African National Congress | African National Congress |
| 3 Feb 2026 | 4 | African National Congress | Democratic Alliance (Note: The former councillor was re-elected to the ward on behalf of a different party.) |

== November 2026 election ==
The following table shows the results of the 2026 election.

| Party | Ward | | | List | | | Total seats |
| Party | Votes | % | Seats | Votes | % | Seats | Total seats |
|---|---|---|---|---|---|---|---|
| Democratic Alliance | 9,691 | 38.85 | 9 | 9,948 | 39.75 | 0 | 9 |
| African National Congress | 3,878 | 15.55 | 1 | 3,959 | 15.82 | 3 | 4 |
| Patriotic Alliance | 3,791 | 15.20 | 1 | 3,685 | 14.72 | 3 | 4 |
| Freedom Front Plus | 2,079 | 8.33 | 0 | 2,016 | 8.05 | 2 | 2 |
| Langerberg Independent Party | 1,390 | 5.57 | 0 | 1,339 | 5.35 | 1 | 1 |
| Better Zolani | 863 | 3.46 | 1 | 911 | 3.64 | 0 | 1 |
| Langeberg First | 864 | 3.46 | 0 | 692 | 2.76 | 1 | 1 |
| Langeberg Ratepayers Association | 530 | 2.12 | 0 | 581 | 2.32 | 1 | 1 |
| People's Democratic Movement | 474 | 1.90 | 0 | 440 | 1.76 | 0 | 0 |
| Economic Freedom Fighters | 265 | 1.06 | 0 | 276 | 1.10 | 0 | 0 |
| Good | 257 | 1.03 | 0 | 268 | 1.07 | 0 | 0 |
| uMkhonto weSizwe Party | 236 | 0.95 | 0 | 224 | 0.89 | 0 | 0 |
| African Christian Democratic Party | 182 | 0.73 | 0 | 204 | 0.82 | 0 | 0 |
| South African Communist Party | 97 | 0.39 | 0 | 96 | 0.38 | 0 | 0 |
| People's Movement for Change | 104 | 0.42 | 0 | 77 | 0.31 | 0 | 0 |
| Pan Africanist Congress of Azania | 81 | 0.32 | 0 | 96 | 0.38 | 0 | 0 |
| National Coloured Congress | 70 | 0.28 | 0 | 79 | 0.32 | 0 | 0 |
| Africa Restoration Alliance | 23 | 0.09 | 0 | 57 | 0.23 | 0 | 0 |
| Cape Independence Party | 30 | 0.12 | 0 | 37 | 0.15 | 0 | 0 |
| Afrika Mayibuye Movement | 23 | 0.09 | 0 | 21 | 0.08 | 0 | 0 |
| Organic Humanity Movement | 18 | 0.07 | 0 | 22 | 0.09 | 0 | 0 |
| Total | 24,946 | 100.00 | 12 | 25,028 | 100.00 | 11 | 23 |
| Valid votes | 24,946 | 98.29 | | 25,028 | 98.34 | | |
| Invalid/blank votes | 435 | 1.71 | | 423 | 1.66 | | |
| Total votes | 25,381 | 100.00 | | 25,451 | 100.00 | | |
| Registered voters/turnout | 48,560 | 52.27 | | 48,560 | 52.41 | | |
