= Archibald Singham =

Sri Lankan political scientist and historian (1932–1991)

Archibald Wickeramaraja Singham, also known as Archie Singham or A. W. Singham (1932–1991) was a Sri Lankan political scientist and historian, professor of political science at Brooklyn College of City University of New York. He was an authority on the Caribbean and a participant in the Non-Aligned Movement.

== Life ==
Archie Singham was born in British Burma to Sri Lankan parents. He was educated in Sri Lanka before doing his bachelors at Wesleyan University. He married Shirley Hune, who later became the associate provost of Hunter College.

Singham became one of the founding members of the Department of Government at the University of the West Indies – Mona, and taught there from 1960 to 1970. He also gained a master's from the University of Michigan, and in 1967 completed his Ph.D. there.

Singham taught briefly at the University of Michigan before being recruited as one of the 'black scholars' (despite his Asian heritage) by Andrew Billingsley to Howard University at the end of the 1960s. He also taught at the University of Manchester in England before moving to Brooklyn College in 1978. In testimony to the US Congress, Singham criticized the 1983 United States invasion of Grenada, and called for the US to withdraw its troops.

Singham died on 13 March 1991. Two books on peace were dedicated to Singham's memory.

His son is the software entrepreneur Neville Roy Singham.

== Works ==
- "Three Cases of Constitutionalism and Cuckoo Politics: Ceylon, British Guyana and Grenada". New World Quarterly. 2 (1): 23–33. 1965.
- Readings in government and politics of the West Indies. Kingston, Jamaica: Printed by Instant Letter Service Co., 1967.
- The hero and the crowd in a colonial polity. New Haven: Yale University Press, 1968.
- "C. L. R. James on the Black Jacobin Revolution in San Domingo – Notes toward a Theory of Black Politics". Savacou. 1: 82–96. 1970.
- (with N. L. Singham) Singham, A. W.; Singham, N. L. (June 1973). "Cultural Domination and Political Subordination: Notes Towards a Theory of the Caribbean Political System". Comparative Studies in Society and History. 15 (3): 258–88. doi:10.1017/S0010417500007118. S2CID 145658566.
- (ed.) The Commonwealth Caribbean into the seventies : proceedings of a conference held on 28–30 September 1973 at Howard University, Washington, D.C. Montreal: Center for Developing-Area Studies, McGill University, 1975.
- (ed. with Tran Van Dinh) From Bandung to Colombo : conferences of the non-aligned countries, 1955-75. New York: Third Press Review Books, 1976.
- Singham, A. W. (1976). "The Fifth Summit Conference of the Non-Aligned Movement". The Black Scholar. 8 (3): 2–9. doi:10.1080/00064246.1976.11413869. ISSN 0006-4246. JSTOR 41066077.
- (ed.) The Nonaligned movement in world politics: a symposium held at Howard University. Includes proceedings of the Sri Lanka Nonalignment conference. Westport, Conn.: Lawrence Hill, 1977.
- (with Shirley Hune) The non-aligned movement and the Namibian question. Chandigarh, India: Centre for Research in Rural & Industrial Development, 1985.
- (with Shirley Hune) Non-alignment in an age of alignments. Westport, Conn.: L. Hill; London: Zed Books, 1986.
