= Midvaal Local Municipality elections =

Local elections in Gauteng, South Africa

The Midvaal Local Municipality council consists of thirty members elected by mixed-member proportional representation. Fifteen councillors are elected by first-past-the-post voting in fifteen wards, while the remaining fifteen are chosen from party lists so that the total number of party representatives is proportional to the number of votes received.

In the election of 4 November 2026 the Democratic Alliance (DA) won a majority of nineteen seats on the council.

== Results ==
The following table shows the composition of the council after past elections.

Event	ANC	DA	EFF	FF+	Other	Total
2000 election	6	9	—	1	2	18
2006 election	8	11	—	0	0	19
2011 election	11	15	—	1	0	27
2016 election	9	17	2	1	0	29
2021 election	6	19	2	2	1	30
2026 election	5	19	1	2	3	30

== December 2000 election ==
The following table shows the results of the 2000 election.

Party	Ward			List			Total seats
Party	Votes	%	Seats	Votes	%	Seats	Total seats
Democratic Alliance	7,831	52.06	5	8,097	55.50	4	9
African National Congress	4,846	32.21	3	5,040	34.54	3	6
Alliance of Independents Midvaal	912	6.06	0	626	4.29	1	1
Independent candidates	677	4.50	1				1
Freedom Front Plus	331	2.20	0	342	2.34	1	1
Inkatha Freedom Party	160	1.06	0	212	1.45	0	0
Pan Africanist Congress of Azania	188	1.25	0	139	0.95	0	0
African Christian Democratic Party	98	0.65	0	134	0.92	0	0
Total	15,043	100.00	9	14,590	100.00	9	18
Valid votes	15,043	97.61		14,590	95.42		
Invalid/blank votes	369	2.39		701	4.58		
Total votes	15,412	100.00		15,291	100.00		
Registered voters/turnout	30,803	50.03		30,803	49.64		

== March 2006 election ==
The following table shows the results of the 2006 election.

Party	Ward			List			Total seats
Party	Votes	%	Seats	Votes	%	Seats	Total seats
Democratic Alliance	11,908	55.40	6	11,892	56.00	5	11
African National Congress	8,165	37.99	4	8,289	39.04	4	8
People's Forum	299	1.39	0	287	1.35	0	0
Freedom Front Plus	260	1.21	0	306	1.44	0	0
Independent candidates	421	1.96	0				0
Pan Africanist Congress of Azania	174	0.81	0	161	0.76	0	0
Independent Democrats	141	0.66	0	145	0.68	0	0
Inkatha Freedom Party	127	0.59	0	154	0.73	0	0
Total	21,495	100.00	10	21,234	100.00	9	19
Valid votes	21,495	98.63		21,234	97.57		
Invalid/blank votes	299	1.37		529	2.43		
Total votes	21,794	100.00		21,763	100.00		
Registered voters/turnout	38,552	56.53		38,552	56.45		

== May 2011 election ==
The following table shows the results of the 2011 election.

Party	Ward			List			Total seats
Party	Votes	%	Seats	Votes	%	Seats	Total seats
Democratic Alliance	18,271	56.58	9	18,186	56.20	6	15
African National Congress	13,256	41.05	5	13,525	41.80	6	11
Freedom Front Plus	316	0.98	0	254	0.78	1	1
Pan Africanist Congress of Azania	237	0.73	0	106	0.33	0	0
Congress of the People	101	0.31	0	150	0.46	0	0
National Freedom Party	48	0.15	0	52	0.16	0	0
Inkatha Freedom Party	0	0.00	0	87	0.27	0	0
Independent candidates	65	0.20	0				0
Total	32,294	100.00	14	32,360	100.00	13	27
Valid votes	32,294	98.84		32,360	98.87		
Invalid/blank votes	379	1.16		369	1.13		
Total votes	32,673	100.00		32,729	100.00		
Registered voters/turnout	47,961	68.12		47,961	68.24		

== August 2016 election ==
The following table shows the results of the 2016 election.

Party	Ward			List			Total seats
Party	Votes	%	Seats	Votes	%	Seats	Total seats
Democratic Alliance	21,346	59.61	11	21,426	59.80	6	17
African National Congress	11,487	32.08	4	11,497	32.09	5	9
Economic Freedom Fighters	1,731	4.83	0	1,706	4.76	2	2
Freedom Front Plus	1,088	3.04	0	1,053	2.94	1	1
Congress of the People	159	0.44	0	150	0.42	0	0
Total	35,811	100.00	15	35,832	100.00	14	29
Valid votes	35,811	99.21		35,832	99.23		
Invalid/blank votes	286	0.79		278	0.77		
Total votes	36,097	100.00		36,110	100.00		
Registered voters/turnout	54,978	65.66		54,978	65.68		

== November 2021 election ==
The following table shows the results of the 2021 election.

Party	Ward			List			Total seats
Party	Votes	%	Seats	Votes	%	Seats	Total seats
Democratic Alliance	19,384	62.44	12	19,471	62.95	7	19
African National Congress	6,613	21.30	3	6,515	21.06	3	6
Freedom Front Plus	1,963	6.32	0	1,909	6.17	2	2
Economic Freedom Fighters	1,589	5.12	0	1,529	4.94	2	2
Transformative Youth Movement	589	1.90	0	537	1.74	1	1
African Christian Democratic Party	219	0.71	0	262	0.85	0	0
Patriotic Alliance	181	0.58	0	199	0.64	0	0
Pan Africanist Congress of Azania	84	0.27	0	111	0.36	0	0
United Independent Movement	64	0.21	0	89	0.29	0	0
Congress of the People	62	0.20	0	87	0.28	0	0
African Transformation Movement	62	0.20	0	84	0.27	0	0
Independent candidates	105	0.34	0				0
Community Solidarity Association	52	0.17	0	48	0.16	0	0
Africa Restoration Alliance	45	0.14	0	42	0.14	0	0
New Horizon Movement	20	0.06	0	24	0.08	0	0
South African Royal Kingdoms Organization	13	0.04	0	26	0.08	0	0
Total	31,045	100.00	15	30,933	100.00	15	30
Valid votes	31,045	98.90		30,933	98.76		
Invalid/blank votes	344	1.10		388	1.24		
Total votes	31,389	100.00		31,321	100.00		
Registered voters/turnout	58,122	54.01		58,122	53.89		

=== By-elections from November 2021 ===
The following by-elections were held to fill vacant ward seats in the period from the election in November 2021.

Date	Ward	Party of the previous councillor	Party of the newly elected councillor
5 Feb 2025	1	Democratic Alliance	Democratic Alliance

== November 2026 election ==
The following table shows the results of the election.

Party	Ward			List			Total seats
Party	Votes	%	Seats	Votes	%	Seats	Total seats
Democratic Alliance	24,478	61.34	13	24,844	62.50	6	19
African National Congress	6,733	16.87	2	6,072	15.27	3	5
Freedom Front Plus	3,059	7.67	0	3,038	7.64	2	2
Economic Freedom Fighters	1,525	3.82	0	1,504	3.78	1	1
uMkhonto weSizwe Party	1,246	3.12	0	1,275	3.21	1	1
ActionSA	1,131	2.83	0	1,242	3.12	1	1
Transformative Yes Movement	471	1.18	0	435	1.09	1	1
South African Communist Party	280	0.70	0	282	0.71	0	0
Pan Africanist Congress of Azania	162	0.41	0	171	0.43	0	0
African Christian Democratic Party	154	0.39	0	153	0.38	0	0
African Transformation Movement	82	0.21	0	171	0.43	0	0
Patriotic Alliance	119	0.30	0	110	0.28	0	0
Active Citizens of South Africa	116	0.29	0	95	0.24	0	0
Afrika Mayibuye Movement	76	0.19	0	66	0.17	0	0
Inkatha Freedom Party	72	0.18	0	70	0.18	0	0
Vaal Party	54	0.14	0	60	0.15	0	0
African Congress for Transformation	17	0.04	0	60	0.15	0	0
Civic Movement for Progressive Citizens	65	0.16	0				0
United Africans Transformation	14	0.04	0	49	0.12	0	0
All Citizens Party	7	0.02	0	22	0.06	0	0
Organic Humanity Movement	18	0.05	0	10	0.03	0	0
African Economic Freedom	8	0.02	0	14	0.04	0	0
Mawusa Movement Party	8	0.02	0	9	0.02	0	0
Economic Liberators Forum South Africa	13	0.03	0				0
Total	39,908	100.00	15	39,752	100.00	15	30
Valid votes	39,908	98.31		39,752	98.54		
Invalid/blank votes	685	1.69		590	1.46		
Total votes	40,593	100.00		40,342	100.00		
Registered voters/turnout	66,306	61.22		66,306	60.84		
