= BreakThrough News =

New York City-based news agency

BreakThrough News @btnewsroom
- Abbreviation: BT News or BTN
- Location: New York City, United States
- Website: breakthroughnews.org

BreakThrough News (BT News or BTN) is an American far-left online media and news outlet based in New York City.

== History ==
In early 2020, BTN began posting to Instagram and YouTube with coverage of the COVID-19 pandemic, the George Floyd protests, racial injustice in the US, and economic inequality.

In 2022, the American think tank Newlines Institute alleged that BreakThrough News had denied the persecution of Uyghurs in China, and described BTN contributor Rania Khalek as an "apologist" for former Syrian dictator Bashar al-Assad with links to Russian State-funded media.

In 2023, Pacifica Radio's New York station WBAI began hosting a 1-hour slot for BTN, with hosts including Eugene Puryear, Rania Khalek, Kei Pritzker, and Brian Becker.

In 2024, BTN journalists provided on-the-ground coverage of pro-Palestinian campus protests, including at Columbia University, which was cited by outlets including Al Jazeera, The Guardian, The Independent, and Fortune.

In 2025, BTN and Watermelon Pictures produced the documentary film The Encampments. The film covered the 2024 pro-Palestinian protests on university campuses, with particular focus on the Gaza Solidarity Encampment and broader campus protests at Columbia University. The film's directors were BTN journalist Kei Pritsker and filmmaker Michael Workman; its executive producers were Macklemore and BTN editor-in-chief Ben Becker. It premiered at the CPH:DOX Film Festival in Copenhagen in March 2025, where it received a Special Mention from the Human Rights Award jury. The film subsequently received a limited U.S. theatrical release, grossing approximately $500,000.

On July 21, 2026, the US House Ways and Means Committee issued a subpoena to BreakThrough News demanding the release of certain internal communications and donor information pursuant to its probe into $39 million in donations tied to businessman and far-left activist Neville Roy Singham. BreakThrough News appeared on Democracy Now! denouncing the subpoena as being a violation of their First Amendment rights and a McCarthyism-like witch hunt.

== Staff and contributors ==
BTN's leadership are almost all leaders in the Party for Socialism and Liberation (PSL). In 2023, BTN's anchors were PSL co-founders Brian Becker and Eugene Puryear, and Rania Khalek; its editor-in-chief was PSL central committee member Ben Becker; and its secretary was Claudia De la Cruz. BTN works closely with Tricontinental Institute for Social Research and has often hosted Tricontinental founder Vijay Prashad. Other frequent contributors include Abby Martin, Kei Pritsker, and Katie Halper.

In 2023, The Daily Beast contributor William Bredderman wrote that BreakThrough News is part of a "network of pro-Moscow, pro-Beijing content creators" funded by the American businessman Neville Roy Singham. BTN is a member of the International People's Media Network, a coalition of media outlets that also work in conjunction with the Tricontinental Institute for Social Research.

== See also ==
- Party for Socialism and Liberation
