= Neville Roy Singham =

American businessman and socialist activist (born 1954)

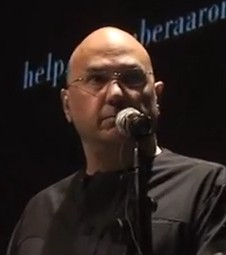
- Singham in 2013
- Born: Neville Roy Singham; May 13, 1954 (age 72); Middletown, Connecticut, U.S.
- Other names: Chinese: 罗一, Pinyin: Luó Yī
- Education: Howard University
- Occupation: Businessman
- Known for: Social activism
- Spouse: Jodie Evans (married 2017–present)
- Parent: Archibald Singham (father)

Neville Roy Singham (Chinese: 罗一, Pinyin: Luó Yī; born May 13, 1954) is an American businessman and leftist activist. He founded and led the IT consulting firm Thoughtworks, which he sold for $785 million in 2017. He also served as a strategic technical advisor at Huawei throughout the 2000s. A resident of Shanghai, China, Singham is a prominent benefactor of far-left causes globally. He has been described as a socialist and admirer of Maoism.

According to The New York Times, Singham coordinates closely with the Chinese government and state media, and funds groups, news organizations and politicians around the world which spread Chinese government propaganda. He has funded efforts to deny or downplay allegations of Chinese persecution and human rights abuses against Uyghur Muslims. He also funded opposition to aid to Ukraine following Russia's full-scale invasion.

In the United States, Singham funds and leads an array of far-left advocacy organizations, political parties, think tanks and news outlets. This group of organizations, once described by leftist commentator Hasan Piker as Singham's "operation", include: Code Pink, The People's Forum, ANSWER Coalition, BreakThrough News, Tricontinental, and the International Peoples' Assembly. He also leads organizations in Brazil, India, and South Africa.

Singham's activities have prompted investigations by the US Department of Justice under both the Biden and second Trump administrations, and by the US Congress' House Ways and Means Committee.

== Early life ==
Singham's father Archibald Singham was Sri Lankan. In his youth, Singham was a member of the League of Revolutionary Black Workers, a Black nationalist–Maoist group, taking a job at a Chrysler plant in Detroit in 1972 as an activist in the group. He attended Howard University before starting a consulting firm for equipment-leasing companies from his Chicago home.

== Career ==
Singham founded Thoughtworks, a Chicago-based IT consulting company that provides custom software, software tools, and consulting services, in the late 1980s; it was incorporated in 1993.

From 2001 to 2008, Singham was a strategic technical consultant for Huawei.

In 2005, Thoughtworks opened offices in China.

By 2008, Thoughtworks employed 1,000 people and was growing at a rate of 20–30% per annum, with locations around the world. Its clients included Microsoft, Oracle, major banks, and The Guardian newspaper. Singham owned 97% of the common stock of the company.

In 2010, Singham opened Thoughtworks' Fifth Agile Software Development Conference in Beijing, where he spoke about his influence on Huawei.

Singham sold ThoughtWorks to private equity firm Apax Partners in 2017 for $785 million, by which time it had 4,500 employees across 15 countries, including South Africa and Uganda. Its chief scientist, Martin Fowler, wrote that Singham had not been involved in the running of the business for some years by that time.

After selling the company, he moved to China, where he owns or co-owns a number of businesses.

In 2019, he started a consulting business with partners who also co-own (with a Chinese municipality) a media company that promotes anti-poverty policies in Tongren in 2019. Singham has business interests in Chinese companies in the food and consultancy markets. As of 2023, his office is in Shanghai, and is shared with the Maku Group, "whose goal is to educate foreigners about 'the miracles that China has created on the world stage'" and to which Singham has given nearly $1.8 million in funding.

== Positions ==
Singham praised Hugo Chavez, describing Venezuela under his rule as a "phenomenally democratic place." He also described his admiration for China, where Thoughtworks had a growing operation, describing it as a model for governance: "China is teaching the West that the world is better off with a dual system of both free-market adjustments and long-term planning."

He is a supporter of WikiLeaks and its founder Julian Assange, speaking in his defense at a 2011 event hosted by The Real News Network, along with fellow activist software businessman Peter Thiel and former intelligence whistleblower Daniel Ellsberg. Alongside Ellsberg, he has also advocated for Jeremy Hammond and Aaron Swartz; the latter was working for him at Thoughtworks when he committed suicide while facing prosecution by the US government. Singham, a friend of Swartz, described his prosecution as part of a coordinated campaign.

During the Russo-Ukrainian war, Singham has been funding efforts to oppose NATO enlargement.

In July 2023, Singham "joined a Communist Party workshop" about international promotion of the Chinese Communist Party.

Singham has funded The People's Forum, a US nonprofit group in New York City that has been associated with organizing the Gaza war protests at universities.

== Funding network and links to Chinese government ==
According to a January 2022 report by New Lines Magazine, Singham was linked to donations of almost $65 million to a network of non-profit organizations, including Code Pink, the People’s Support Foundation, Tricontinental, and The People’s Forum, that often takes Beijing's side on genocide allegations. The report also described Singham‘s personal connections to members of the network (to Code Pink’s Jodie Evans and Vijay Prashad of Tricontinental) and overlapping personnel between Thoughtworks and members of the network (specifically the Peoples Support Fund and United Community Fund).

In July 2022, the South African publication New Frame shut down, after having discreetly received most of its money from Singham since its 2018 launch. The staff wanted to keep raising money to continue the project, with some suspecting that it was an outlier because it had not fallen into line with the ideology of the rest of Singham's network of outlets.

According to a May 2023 article in The Daily Beast, there are connections between Singham and organizations on the far-left that promote CCP talking points, including BreakThrough News, Peoples Dispatch and other members of the International People's Media Network. The article said there were overlapping personnel at a number of these organizations and media outlets without actual office locations. The article said some members of BreakThrough News' leadership are affiliated with the Party for Socialism and Liberation.

In August 2023, The New York Times reported that Singham works closely with the Chinese government and state media, and donates to various groups, news organizations and entities through non-profit groups and shell companies which spread pro-Chinese government messages. Chinese state media accounts had retweeted people and organizations in Mr. Singham's network 122 times since February 2020. The non-profits distributing the funding included the United Community Fund, Justice and Education Fund and People's Support Foundation, have addresses at UPS store mailboxes in Illinois, Wisconsin and New York, and headed by Jodie Evans (founder of CODE PINK) or former ThoughtWorks employees. Funded groups include: an Indian-based independent news site, NewsClick, that the Times described as having "sprinkled its coverage with Chinese government talking points"; in South Africa the Nkrumah School, the Socialist Revolutionary Workers Party and the New Frame news startup (whose editor had resigned in 2022 citing its "soft coverage" of China and Russia); the Brasil de Fato newspaper in Brazil; and activist groups No Cold War, Code Pink, People's Forum, and Tricontinental in the United States. In response to the Times report, Singham said that he was not a "member of, work for, take orders from, or follow instructions of any political party or government or their representatives".

Following the August 2023 New York Times report, US senator Marco Rubio asked the United States Department of Justice to open an investigation into entities related to Singham for potential violations of the Foreign Agents Registration Act (FARA).

The Delhi Police also opened an investigation into NewsClick, focused on funding by Singham and its role in pushing a pro-China narrative. The police allege that "Email communications between Singham, Vijay Prashad, Prabir and their associates established that Singham was actively pursuing the China line on Covid-19, despite mounting criticism of the same from the international community. Singham is seen clearly nudging Prabir and the PPK NewsClick team to peddle the Chinese version…" It also accused Singham and his associates with creating a web of organizations to funnel money into NewsClick.

Singham also funds the People's Forum, ANSWER Coalition, the International People's Assembly, and the "Shut It Down for Palestine" (SID4P) campaign established in October 2023 during the start of the Gaza war. This prompted Republicans on the United States House Committee on Oversight and Government Reform to call for an investigation.

The United States House Committee on Ways and Means began an investigation into Singham and his connections to the CCP in January 2026.

In May 2026, left-wing streamer Hasan Piker implicated Neville Roy Singham's funding network in a federal subpoena served to Piker and fellow activists regarding a 2026 trip to Cuba. In a livestream titled: "The Feds are After Me," Piker alleged that the government investigation into him and activists associated with Code Pink and the ANSWER coalition were actually a way of indirectly targeting Mr. Singham. Saying during the livestream: “I think that ultimately the target is probably Singham and his operation from PSL to ANSWER Coalition to CodePink — like anything that he has ever financed.”

In July 2026, it was reported that he was being investigated for potential violations of US tax law.

=== ANSWER Coalition ===
ANSWER (Act Now to Stop War and End Racism), which has some "financial, personal, personnel and ideological" connections to Singham, is a coalition of groups that organize protests against the "Iran war, Israel and US policy".

=== Tricontinental ===
Tricontinental is a Massachusetts-based think-tank, where Neville Roy Singham serves as chairman of the international advisory board and his son, Nate Singham, was a researcher. Tricontinental’s executive director, Vijay Prashad, said that Singham was the "original source" for Tricontinental’s endowment. Tricontinental is now the main arm of the opposition to the United States' efforts to divorce itself from Chinese technology and artificial intelligence research. Prashad is also a member of a CCP-linked think-tank whose leader, Wang Wen, is a member of the CCP’s leading foreign influence arm known as the United Front.

=== Code Pink ===
Code Pink is an activist group founded and formed by Singham's wife Jodie Evans, a former Democratic Party operative, to protest the 2003 invasion of Iraq. Since 2017, approximately a quarter of Code Pink’s donations totaling more than $1.4 million have come from groups linked to Neville Roy Singham. Before Evans's and Singham's partnership, Evans and Code Pink were critics of the human rights violations of the Chinese Communist Party. Post-marriage Evans and her organization have toned down their critical stance towards China and its government. Both Evans and Code Pink have been critical of reports that China is conducting a genocide of its Muslim minority ethnic population. Code Pink activists have denied evidence of forced labor re-education camps in Xinjiang. Jodie Evans and other Code Pink members have visited North Korea with the group “Women Cross DMZ."

=== The People's Forum ===
The People's Forum is a Nongovernmental Organization connected to progressive groups and based in New York City. The People’s Forum hosts classes titled “Racial Capitalism” and “Spanish for Social Justice.” CBS News described it as "a left-leaning nonprofit that advocates for causes impacting the working class and other marginalized groups". It is a frequent organizer of protests in the city, including the October 8, 2023, rally "All Out For Palestine." The organization has been accused of supporting Hamas. President of the Government Accountability Institute, Peter Schweizer, has accused The People's Forum of with groups similar to Antifa. The People's Forum has been accused of being connected to the CCP through Neville Roy Singham's financial backing of the organization. Neville Roy Singham's partner Jodie Evans is also listed as a board member of the People's Forum. According to the Free Press, the People's Forum received $20 million from 2017 to 2022 from Singham through a Goldman Sachs Philanthropy Fund. The People's Forum was also active during the racial justice protests of 2020.

BreakThrough News, which is a digital media outlet that has received funding from the People’s Forum, operates out of the same building and has an overlap in staff with the organization. It is alleged to have a pro-Palestine and pro-CCP point of view in its programming.

=== Party for Socialism and Liberation ===
According to Fergie Chambers, the Party for Socialism and Liberation is a central component of Singham's organized network of non-profits and coalitions. Donations to the Party of Socialism and Liberation are processed through its official newsletter, Liberation News. Over the past several years, the PSL has established more than a dozen "Liberation Centers" in multiple American cities. These centers operate as hubs for protest coordination and organizing efforts. Chambers accused Singham's organisation of trying unsuccessfully to dissuade Palestine Action US from taking direct action against the Israeli defence firm Elbit Systems. The PSL is alleged to have ties to the Chinese Communist Party.

== Personal life ==
Singham lives in Shanghai, China. He is married to Code Pink co-founder Jodie Evans, who has become pro-China after marrying Singham in 2017. Singham has also become a major donor to Code Pink, with organizations from his network providing around a quarter of the budget.

His son Nathan Singham works for the Tricontinental: Institute for Social Research, which he funds.
