= Party for Socialism and Liberation =

Communist party in the United States

- Abbreviation: PSL
- Leader: Central Committee
- Founded: June 18, 2004; 22 years ago
- Split from: Workers World Party
- Headquarters: San Francisco, California; Washington, D.C.
- Newspaper: Liberation News
- Ideology: Communism; Marxism–Leninism
- Political position: Far-left
- International affiliation: International Peoples' Assembly
- Colors: Red
- Members in elected offices: 0

Website
- www.pslweb.org

The Party for Socialism and Liberation (PSL) is a Marxist-Leninist communist political party in the United States. PSL formed in 2004, when its members split from the Workers World Party.

PSL describes itself as a revolutionary socialist party in the Leninist tradition, because the party believes that only a revolution can end capitalism and establish socialism. PSL pursues this goal by participating in local protests, running candidates in elections, and conducting political education.

Notable members include Claudia De la Cruz, Eugene Puryear, Gloria La Riva, Jodi Dean, and Michael Prysner.

== Organization ==
=== Membership ===
PSL does not release membership numbers. In 2019, PSL reported branches in "some 90 cities" or "nearly 100 cities". In 2022, PSL reported an "organized presence in over 100 cities". In 2024, PSL reported being "in over 50 cities".

PSL is a democratic centralist party, which means that "all members, including those who disagree, are duty bound to publicly defend and carry out" all PSL decisions. PSL's highest body is its Party Congress, held "every two to three years", which selects its Central Committee leadership. The PSL Central Committee can appoint up to "40 percent" of Congress delegates.

==== ANSWER Coalition ====
When ANSWER was founded, many of ANSWER's lead organizers were members of the Workers World Party (WWP) and its International Action Center, such as Brian Becker. Many of these founders later created PSL.

After PSL split from the WWP, ANSWER became more tightly tied to PSL than to WWP. ANSWER's National Coordinator is Brian Becker, a PSL co-founder who said "we do a great deal of work through" ANSWER. The New Republic described ANSWER as a PSL "front group", and the two have significant financial overlap.

==== BreakThrough News ====
PSL leadership are closely involved with BreakThrough News (BTN). In 2023, BTN's anchors were PSL co-founders Brian Becker and Eugene Puryear, and Rania Khalek; its editor-in-chief was PSL central committee member Ben Becker; and its secretary was Claudia De la Cruz. BTN works closely with Tricontinental Institute for Social Research and has often hosted Tricontinental founder Vijay Prashad.

==== The People's Forum ====
PSL leadership are closely involved with The People's Forum, an event space in New York City, which hosts the BreakThrough News studio. People's Forum was directed by Claudia De la Cruz and funded by Neville Singham. In 2024, De la Cruz ran as the PSL's candidate for President of the United States. In April 2025, Senate Judiciary Committee Chairman Chuck Grassley asked Pam Bondi and Kash Patel to assess whether The People's Forum and Code Pink should register under the Foreign Agents Registration Act due to their alleged connections to the CCP because of their relationship with Neville Roy Singham.

==== Neville Singham ====
Many of the organizations above are funded in part by Neville Roy Singham, an American businessman based in Shanghai who supports organizations and media outlets that have been noted for echoing pro-Beijing political positions. Most of this funding comes from the Justice and Education Fund (JEF), to which Neville Singham has donated more than $20 million, and for which Claudia De la Cruz works as a coordinator.

== History ==
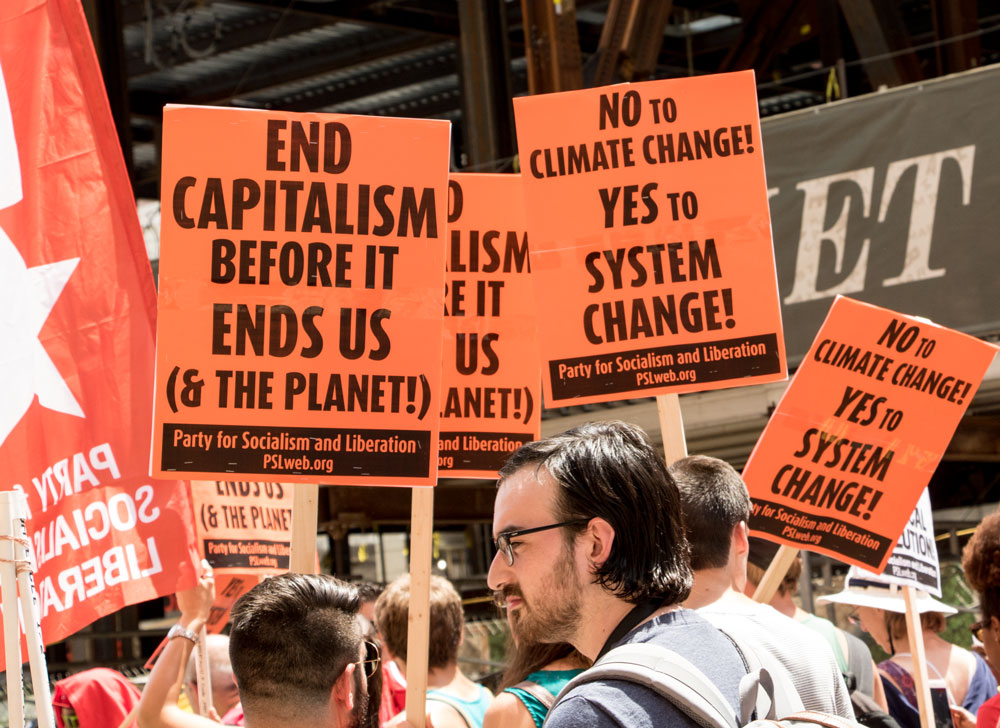
PSL protesters at the 2016 Democratic National Convention in Philadelphia

PSL was formed in June 2004 when the San Francisco branch of Sam Marcy's Workers World Party left the organization. The San Francisco branch, alongside other members, announced that "the Workers World Party leadership is no longer capable of fulfilling [the] mission" of building socialism. PSL co-founders included Richard Becker, Brian Becker, Gloria La Riva, and Eugene Puryear.

In 2015, PSL members joined the 2015 Baltimore protests.

In late 2016 and on January 20, 2017, PSL led protests against the inauguration of Donald Trump in Los Angeles, New York City, and Washington, DC.

In 2020, PSL denied an accusation that it mishandled a sexual abuse allegation in its Philadelphia branch. In 2024, PSL presidential candidate Claudia De la Cruz again denied these allegations, some of which she described as misinformation "doing the job of agents".

In 2020, PSL participated in protests against the Aurora, Colorado police department for the killing of Elijah McClain. Five PSL members were arrested. Three were charged with "kidnapping" for "attempting to ... secrete 18 officers" inside the police station. The kidnapping charges were all thrown out and all felony charges were dropped.

On October 7, 2023, PSL described "the actions of the resistance over the course of the last day" as "a morally and legally legitimate response to occupation". On October 8, 2023, PSL organized a rally in support of Palestine in Times Square in which Central Committee member Eugene Puryear stated: "[T]here was some sort of rave or desert party where they were having a great time, until the resistance came in electrified hang gliders and took at least several dozen hipsters, and I'm sure they're doing very fine despite what the New York Post says."

Since 2023, PSL has organized numerous rallies in favor of Palestinian liberation, including many of the Gaza war protests in the United States.

In 2024, PSL and American Muslims for Palestine (AMP) organized a protest outside of Ohr Torah synagogue in Edison, New Jersey, in opposition to the synagogue holding auctions for property in illegal Israel settlements in the West Bank. A minor scuffle ensured. Both sides blamed the other as aggressors. The Department of Justice (DOJ)'s civil rights head Harmeet Dhillon filed a civil complaint against PSL and AMP, which it accused of making the protest turn "violent". The DOJ used the Freedom of Access to Clinic Entrances (FACE) Act, the first time the law had ever been applied to a non-clinic.

In May 2025, Elias Rodriguez killed two employees of the Israeli embassy in Washington, D.C. Rodriguez was a former PSL member. PSL stated that they "do not support" the shooting, rejected "any attempt to associate the PSL with the DC shooting", and stated that Rodriguez was not a current PSL member, and had only briefly been associated with PSL Chicago in 2017. In 2017, Rodriguez attended a police brutality protest as a PSL member.

PSL helped organize the June 2025 Los Angeles protests against mass deportation.

In May 2026, longtime PSL Steering Committee member Walter Smolarek led a split from PSL, which took the Brooklyn branch. Smolarek claimed PSL leadership suppressed internal debate, surveilled its members, and opposed "base-building" labor organizing work. PSL leadership denied each charge in detail.

During the 2026 midterm elections, the PSL won its first elected office when Frank Lara was elected to the South San Francisco Unified School District Board of Trustees with 61% of the vote in a nonpartisan election.

== Political positions ==
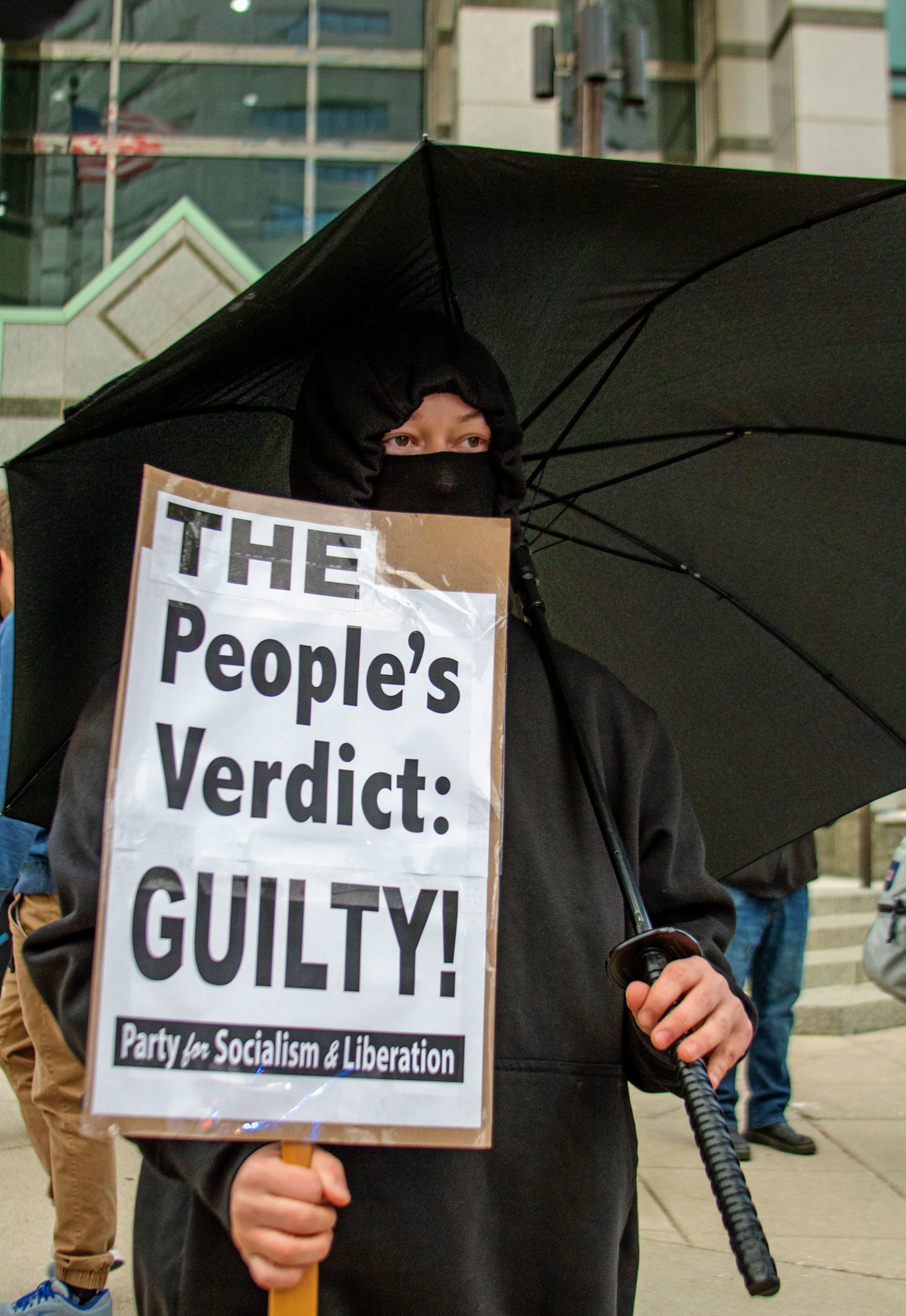
A PSL supporter protesting against the 2021 killing of Ma'Khia Bryant

PSL is a Marxist–Leninist party. PSL's program and constitution simply identify PSL as Marxist, while PSL's other writings identify PSL as a Marxist–Leninist party in the Leninist party model. Other socialists, such as Green presidential candidate Howie Hawkins, label PSL as second campist.

PSL describes its primary goal as the revolutionary overthrow of capitalism and the institution of socialism, stating that "humanity today has only two choices: an increasingly destructive capitalism, or socialism". PSL holds that the United States is "a dictatorship of the capitalist class" that cannot change "without a socialist revolution".

=== Domestic affairs ===
PSL's supports nationalization of the largest 100 domestic corporations, free childcare for all, expanded public transit, social housing, prohibition on "exploitation of labor for private profit", guaranteed employment, a "guaranteed living income", comprehensive social benefits, a 30-hour workweek, and socialist economic planning.

PSL supports a guaranteed right to abortion, equal pay regardless of gender, protection against gender-based or sexuality-based discrimination and violence, and national self-determination and reparations for African Americans and residents of US territories in Puerto Rico, Samoa, Guam, the Virgin Islands and Mariana Islands. The Brown Daily Herald described De la Cruz's platform as prioritizing the needs of Black Americans, women, LGBTQ+ people, and undocumented immigrants. In an interview with Arizona Luminaria, Karina Garcia called for amnesty and legalization for undocumented immigrants.

=== International affairs ===
PSL calls for a 90% cut to the military budget of the United States, the closure of all overseas military bases, and a halt of American aid to Israel.

PSL supports the Workers' Party of Korea, the ruling party of North Korea, which PSL describes as a "communist government" and "one of the few top-to-bottom, actually-existing, alternatives to the global capitalist system". PSL has defended North Korea's human rights record against criticism by the United Nations, which it calls "thinly veiled justification for U.S. aggression toward North Korea", and argues that "conditions in North Korea are vastly better than those in other developing countries". PSL supports North Korea's nuclear weapons program.

PSL supports the Communist Party of China, criticizing only its economic reforms concerning a "market socialist economy". PSL argues that "militant political defense of the Chinese government" is necessary to stave off "counterrevolution, imperialist intervention and dismemberment". PSL defends China's human rights record, and strongly denies that the People's Liberation Army massacred peaceful student protestors in the 1989 Tiananmen Square protests and massacre. PSL denies that China has suppressed democracy in Hong Kong during the 2019–2020 Hong Kong protests.

PSL supported the 2014 Russian annexation of Crimea. PSL did not support the Russian invasion of Ukraine in 2022, but blamed the Russo-Ukrainian war on NATO and the United States. In its statement on "Russia's military intervention", PSL highlighted the "plight of ethnic Russians [...] in the Donbas", Russia's "legitimate security concerns", and NATO's "provocative behavior".

PSL opposes American-led intervention in the Syrian civil war, and has generally been supportive of former Syrian President Bashar al-Assad, and Russian intervention in the conflict. PSL denies that the Syrian government used chemical weapons.

PSL and Code Pink are on the coordinating committee for Neville Roy Singham's International People's Assembly (IPA). The International People's Assembly also includes Singham's thank tank Tricontinental. PSL coordinates with IPA, the People's Forum, Al-Awada, the Palestine Youth Movement and the ANSWER coalition as organizers of the Shut it Down for Palestine coalition.

== Election results ==
PSL has fielded electoral candidates for local, state, and federal offices. PSL candidates usually run on the Peace and Freedom Party ballot line or as independent candidates.

From 2004 to 2024, no PSL candidate won an election. In 2026, PSL-PFP candidate Frank Lara won a nonpartisan school board election.

=== Presidential elections ===
Year	Presidential candidate	Vice presidential candidate	Popular votes	%	Electoral votes	Result	Ballot access	Notes	Ref.
2024	Claudia De la Cruz	Karina Garcia	171,786 (#6)	0.11%	0	Lost	220 / 538	The Peace and Freedom Party and the South Carolina Workers Party also nominated De la Cruz. (Note: 2024: "Ballot access" above includes all states where Claudia de la Cruz was not a write-in; ie, where they were a listed PSL, PFP, or SCWP candidate. Claudia de la Cruz has write-in status in 22 states, with 243 possible electoral votes from write-ins.)	
2020	Gloria La Riva	Sunil Freeman (Note: PSL initially nominated Leonard Peltier, who withdrew for health reasons but remained on the ballot in Minnesota and Illinois.)	86,239 (#6)	0.05%	0	Lost	195 / 538	The Peace and Freedom Party also nominated La Riva. (Note: 2020: "Ballot access" above includes all states where La Riva was not a write-in; ie, where they were a listed PSL, PFP, or LUP candidate.)	
2016	Gloria La Riva	Eugene Puryear	74,027 (#8)	0.05%	0	Lost	112 / 538	The Peace and Freedom Party also nominated La Riva, with Dennis Banks as her running mate. (Note: 2016: "Ballot access" above includes all states where La Riva was not a write-in; ie, where they were a listed PSL, PFP, or LUP candidate.)	
2012	Peta Lindsay	Yari Osorio	7,791 (#7)	0.01%	0	Lost	146 / 538		
2008	Gloria La Riva	Eugene Puryear	6,818	0.01%	0	Lost	137 / 538		

In 2024, the Democratic parties of Georgia and Pennsylvania successfully sued to remove PSL from the ballot. In Georgia, some early ballots still contained De la Cruz's name. Claudia de la Cruz claimed that 6,000 volunteers helped PSL win ballot access in the 2024 United States presidential election.

=== Congressional elections ===
Year	Candidate	Chamber	State	District	Votes	%	Result	Notes	Ref.
2026	Joe Tache	Senate	Massachusetts	n.a.	56,436	2.2%	Lost	running as a Party for Socialism and Liberation candidate	
2026	Greg Levy	Senate	Ohio	n.a.	94.509	2.2%	Lost	running as an independent	
2026	Andre Easton	House	New York	NY-15	10,647	8.7%	Lost	running as a Party for Socialism and Liberation candidate	
2022	José Cortés	House	California	CA-51	3,327	2.2%	Lost	ran as Peace and Freedom Party candidate; did not advance to top-two general	
2020	José Cortés	House	California	CA-50	1,821	0.9%	Lost	ran as Peace and Freedom Party candidate; did not advance to top-two general	
2018	Jordan Mills	House	California	CA-49	233	0.1%	Lost	ran as Peace and Freedom Party candidate; did not advance to top-two general	
2014	Frank Lara	House	California	CA-12	2,107	1.9%	Lost	ran as Peace and Freedom Party candidate; did not advance to top-two general	
2010	Gloria La Riva	House	California	CA-8	5,161	2.5%	Lost	ran as Peace and Freedom Party candidate	
2008	Nathalie Hrizi	House	California	CA-12	5,793	2.2%	Lost	ran as Peace and Freedom Party candidate; did not advance to top-two general	
2008	Michael Prysner	House	Florida	FL-22	6	0.0%	Lost	ran as write-in candidate	

=== Statewide elections ===
Year	Candidate	Office	State	District	Votes	%	Result	Notes	Ref.
2022	Nathalie Hrizi	Insurance Commissioner	California	At-Large	189,289	2.8%	Lost	ran as Peace and Freedom Party candidate	
2022	Meghann Adams	State Treasurer	California	At-Large	242,234	3.6%	Lost	ran as Peace and Freedom Party candidate	
2018	Gloria La Riva	Governor	California	At-Large	19,075	0.3%	Lost	ran as Peace and Freedom Party candidate	
2018	Nathalie Hrizi	Insurance Commissioner	California	At-Large	309,399	5.0%	Lost	ran as Peace and Freedom Party candidate	
2014	Nathalie Hrizi	Insurance Commissioner	California	At-Large	212,991	5.4%	Lost	ran as Peace and Freedom Party candidate	
2010	Carlos Alvarez	Governor	California	At-Large	92,856	0.9%	Lost	ran as Peace and Freedom Party candidate	
2010	Marylou Cabral	Secretary of State	California	At-Large	164,450	0.9%	Lost	ran as Peace and Freedom Party candidate	

=== State legislature elections ===
Year	Candidate	Office	State	District	Votes	%	Result	Notes	Ref.
2024	Kevin Martinez	State Assembly	California	6	1,861	1.8%	Lost	ran as Peace and Freedom Party candidate	
2022	Noah Leininger	State House	Indiana	90	259	1.9%	Lost	ran as write-in candidate	
2021	Ernesto Huerta	State Senate	California	30	1,565	2.2%	Lost	ran as Peace and Freedom Party candidate	
2017	John Prysner	State Assembly	California	51	232	1.0%	Lost	ran as Peace and Freedom Party candidate	
2010	Corey Ansel	State House	Ohio	22	716	1.4%	Lost	ran as Green Party candidate	
2008	Heather Benno	State House	Illinois	40	2,276	10.1%	Lost	ran as Green Party candidate	
2008	John Beacham	State House	Illinois	14	4,745	14.5%	Lost	ran as Green Party candidate	
2008	Lucilla Esguerra	State Assembly	California	48	11,173	12.9%	Lost	ran as Peace and Freedom Party candidate	

=== Local elections ===
Year	Candidate	Office	Area	District	Votes	%	Result	Notes	Ref.
2026	Frank Lara	School Board	South San Francisco	Area E	1,267	60.8%	Won	non-partisan election	
2026	Jasmine Brown	Mayor	Pensacola	At-Large	569	4.1%	Lost	non-partisan election	
2025	John Parker Studebaker	City Council	Phoenixville	West	403	24.6%	Lost	ran as Party for Socialism and Liberation candidate	
2024	Eduardo "Lalo" Vargas	City Council	Los Angeles	14	1,638	4.66%	Lost	non-partisan election	
2023	Ana Santoyo	City Council	Chicago	45	895	5.59%	Lost	non-partisan election	
2021	Colin Dodson	City Council	Urbana	2	57	40.1%	Lost	ran as Party for Socialism and Liberation candidate	
2021	Cathy Rojas	Mayor	New York	At-Large	27,982	2.5%	Lost	ran as Party for Socialism and Liberation candidate	
2014	Eugene Puryear	City Council	Washington D.C.	At-Large	12,525	3.5%	Lost	ran as D.C. Statehood Green Party candidate	
2014	John Beacham	City Council	Chicago	49	0	0%	Lost	withdrawn from ballot due to insufficient nominating petition signatures	
2010	Stevie Merino	Mayor	Long Beach	At-Large	5,057	16%	Lost	non-partisan election	
2009	Carlos Alvarez	Mayor	Los Angeles	At-Large	3,047	1.1%	Lost	non-partisan election	
2009	Francisca Villar (Note: Francisca Villar also given as Frances Villar.)	Mayor	New York	At-Large	3,517	0.3%	Lost	ran as Party for Socialism and Liberation candidate	
2008	Stephen Hinze	Board of Supervisors	Los Angeles	5	29,875	20.7%	Lost	non-partisan election	
2008	Marylou Cabral (Note: Marylou Cabral also given as Marilu Cabral Romero.)	Board of Supervisors	Los Angeles	4	23,703	17.5%	Lost	non-partisan election	
2008	Amanda Todd	City Council	Sioux Falls		12,710	11.1%	Lost		
2008	Sergio Farias	City Council	San Juan Capistrano		1,133	5.0%	Lost		
2008	Crystal Kim	Council	Washington, D.C.	At-Large	0	0%	Lost	write-in, votes not tabulated	

== National conventions ==
PSL does not publish its party constitution. The 2022 Constitution was leaked.

Name	Date	Location	Report	Program	Constitution
Fifth Party Congress	July 2022		no public report	Program, 6th ed	Constitution, 5th ed
Fourth Party Congress	August 2019		no public report	Program, 5th ed	Constitution, 4th ed
Third Party Congress	April 1–3, 2016	San Francisco, CA	Convention report	Program, 4th ed	Constitution, 3rd ed
Second Party Congress	February 2013		no public report	Program, 3rd ed	Constitution, 2nd ed
First Party Congress	February 13–15, 2010	Los Angeles, CA	Convention report	Program, 2nd ed	Constitution, 1st ed
Third National Convention	June 2007		no public report	no changes	
Second National Convention	February 18–20, 2006	San Francisco, CA	Convention report	no changes	
First National Convention	2005		no public report	Program, 1st ed	
Founding Convention	June 18–20, 2004	San Francisco, CA	Convention report	Founding statement	

== See also ==
- History of the socialist movement in the United States
- Democratic Socialists of America
- Freedom Road Socialist Organization
- Socialist Alternative (United States)
- Communist Party USA
- Green Party of the United States
