= Feminist Peace Network =

The Feminist Peace Network (FPN) advocates for the human rights of women and raises awareness about misogyny and the global pandemic of violence against women.

== About ==
Feminist Peace Network (FPN) was started in 2001 by Lucinda Marshall. The organization is based in Louisville. FPN advocates and supports the active participation of women and the full reflection of women's needs in the process of conflict resolution and the creation of sustainable peace and examines many issues including education, health, economics, the environment and media from a gendered lens.

During the Occupy movement, both Code Pink and FPN recruited women to get involved.
