= The Withdrawal =

2022 book by Noam Chomsky and Vijay Prashad

- Author: Noam Chomsky, Vijay Prashad
- Language: English
- Publisher: New Press
- Publication date: August 30, 2022
- Media type: Hardcover
- Pages: 208
- ISBN: 9781620977606

The Withdrawal: Iraq, Libya, Afghanistan and the Fragility of U.S. Power is a 2022 non-fiction book written by Noam Chomsky and Vijay Prashad and is based on a conversation between them in 2021.

== Context ==
The writers discuss American power, in the wake of the 2020–2021 U.S. troop withdrawal from Afghanistan after its war there, and its implications on the involved countries such as Afghanistan, Iraq, Libya, and Vietnam. Then they compare United States' power with China who is trying to build their own power through institutions like Shanghai Cooperation Organisation and Asian Infrastructure Investment Bank.

In their opinion, this will likely lead to a conflict.

== Reception ==
The book has been reviewed by Kirkus Reviews, Foreign Policy, and Library Journal. Kirkus Reviews called it "a collection of insightful geopolitical analyses".
