= Alípio Freire =

Brazilian journalist (1945–2021)

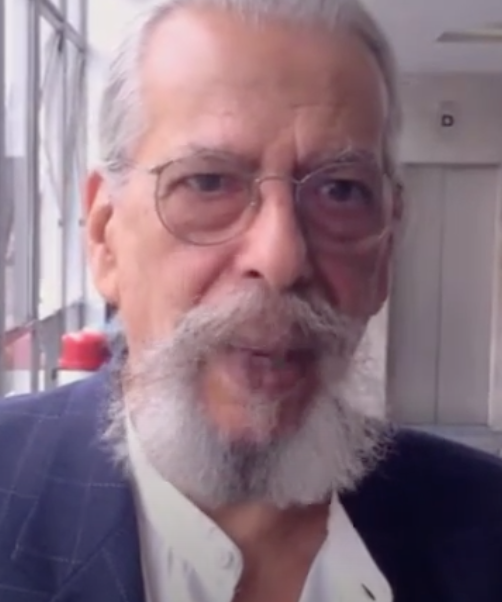
- Born: November 4, 1945; Salvador
- Died: April 22, 2021 (aged 75); São Paulo
- Occupation: Journalist, writer, plastic artist
- Employer: Brasil de Fato

Alípio Raimundo Viana Freire (November 4, 1945, Salvador – April 22, 2021, São Paulo), better known as Alípio Freire, was a Brazilian journalist, writer and artist.

== Biography ==
Freire was a political prisoner in the Brazilian military dictatorship between 1969 and 1974, imprisoned and tortured in the Tiradentes prison. His arrest was due to his role in resisting the military coup, especially for his militancy in the Red Wing. He was amnestied in 2005.

Testimony (in Portuguese) by Alípio Freire in the documentary "Nothing Will Be Like Before. Nothing?" (1985).

Freire was a founding member of the Workers' Party. He served in the Landless Rural Workers Movement.

Freire worked in several alternative journalistic publications. During the dictatorship, he participated in Proletarian Struggle and Operative Unit. Later, he founded the magazine Sem Terra and the newspaper Brasil de Fato.

He wrote Estação Paraíso and Estação Liberdade. He produced the documentary "1964 – A coup against Brazil".

Freire died on April 22 as a result of complications related to COVID-19.
