= International Peoples' Assembly =

International network of socialist and labor organizations

- Formation: 2015
- Website: ipa-aip.org

The International Peoples' Assembly (IPA) is an international network of socialist and labor organizations.

== History ==
In 2015, the Landless Workers' Movement (MST) created the Dilemmas of Humanity conference, which would later become the IPA.

In 2019, the IPA held its first global convention in Caracas, Venezuela, where attendees agreed to "pronounce ourselves in defense of the Bolivarian Revolution and the legitimate and constitutional President, Nicolás Maduro". In 2020, IPA and other leftist organizations held an "International Week of Anti-Imperialist Struggle" that lasted from May 25 to May 30. In 2023, the IPA held a "brigade" in Havana, Cuba, in opposition to the US embargo of Cuba.

== International People's Media Network ==
IPA partners include its International People's Media Network (IPMN) and its International Collective for Political Education (ICPE), the former and later previously described as IPAs "Coordinating Committee."

IPMN is a self-described "network of independent progressive media projects from across the globe seeking to collectively redefine journalism and the media in a time of global crisis"

This media network includes People's Dispatch, Dongsheng, Brasil de Fato, BreakThrough News, Pan African TV, ARG, and Madaar.

Additional media network members include:

- ALBA Movements
- ArgMedios
- Bangladesh Women's Liberation Council
- Brasil de Fato
- BreakThrough News
- CODEPINK
- Communist Party of Nepal (Unified Socialist) (defunct)
- Communist Party of Spain
- Committee for Peasant Unity
- Democratic Way
- Dongsheng
- Francisco de Miranda Front
- Landless Workers' Movement
- Moroccan Human Rights Association
- Madaar
- National Union of Metal Workers of South Africa
- New Frame
- NewsClick
- Palestinian People's Party
- Patria Grande Front
- People's Dispatch, formerly The Dawn News
- Popular Education Project
- Power to the People
- Party for Socialism and Liberation
- Pan African Television
- Resumen Latinoamericano
- Socialist Party of Zambia
- Socialist Revolutionary Workers Party of South Africa
- Tricontinental: Institute for Social Research
- Workers Party of Bangladesh
- Workers' Party of Tunisia
- Workers' Central Union of Cuba

== See also ==
- São Paulo Forum
- List of left-wing internationals
