= Eugene Puryear =

American journalist, writer, activist, and politician

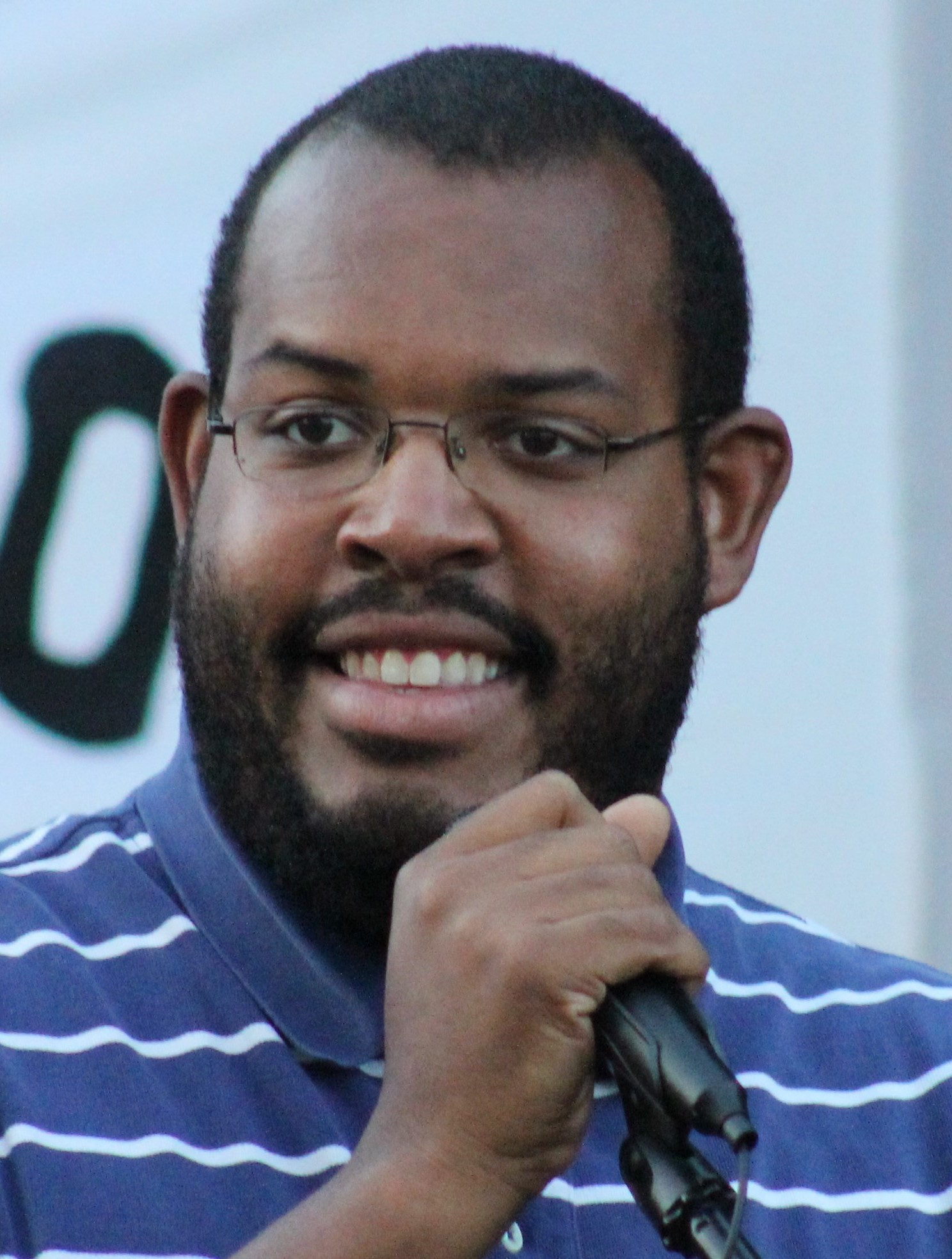
- Puryear in 2015
- Born: February 28, 1986 (age 40); Charlottesville, Virginia, U.S.
- Education: Howard University
- Occupations: Journalist, activist
- Political party: D.C. Statehood Green Party; Party for Socialism and Liberation

Eugene Puryear (born February 28, 1986) is a leftist American journalist, writer, activist, politician, and host on BreakThrough News. In 2014, he was a candidate for the at-large seat in the DC Council with the D.C. Statehood Green Party. In the 2008 and 2016 United States presidential elections, Puryear was the vice presidential nominee of the Party for Socialism and Liberation (PSL), despite being ineligible to become vice president due to his age.

== Campaign for Council of the District of Columbia ==
In 2014, Puryear ran as a D.C. Statehood Green Party candidate for the At-Large City Council seat held at the time by Anita Bonds. Puryear was also endorsed by the Metro DC Democratic Socialists of America. His campaign put forward a 10-point program, which describes some of the policy positions taken by Puryear. On April 1, 2014, Puryear won the party's nomination, defeating G. Lee Aikin 67.3%–25.1%. On November 4, 2014, Puryear placed sixth out of 14 candidates in the general election.

== Journalism ==
Puryear wrote the book Shackled and Chained: Mass Incarceration in Capitalist America, published by PSL Publications. Among the book's perspectives is a critique of Michelle Alexander's The New Jim Crow, which Puryear writes does not attend to the historical transformations of white supremacy and capitalism. He stated that mass incarceration "is a political and state response to the masses of Black people being thrown out of the productive process altogether," whereas "slavery and Jim Crow were designed around Black people actually laboring."

Puryear writes regularly for Liberation News, the newspaper of the Party for Socialism and Liberation. He has co-edited some of the PSL's books, such as Imperialism in the 21st Century: Updating Lenin's Theory a Century Later. He was the host of the daily political talk show By Any Means Necessary, on Russian government-owned Radio Sputnik. Puryear is currently the host of the shows The Freedom Side LIVE and the Punch Out on BreakThrough News. Additionally, he taught a 4-part digital course for Liberation School titled, "Black Struggle is Class Struggle," which analyzes Black revolutionary history in the United States and its central role in the development of U.S. society.

== Activism ==
Puryear studied at Howard University, where he became a lead organizer with the anti-war ANSWER coalition and has helped organize large protests against the Israeli blockade of Gaza. Puryear and the ANSWER coalition were involved in the campaign to free the Jena 6. As a freshman at Howard in 2005, Puryear was interviewed by The Washington Post as an "activist-in-training" and cited his engagement with activism against gentrification, racism, the US occupation of Iraq and other issues.

Puryear has been deeply involved in the Black Lives Matter movement.

On October 8, 2023, the day after the 2023 Hamas-led attack on Israel, Puryear helped organize a rally in support of Palestine in Times Square. He was recorded giving a speech in which he defended the Re’im music festival massacre, saying, "And as you might have seen, there was some sort of rave or desert party where they were having a great time, until the resistance came in electrified hang gliders and took at least several dozen hipsters, and I'm sure they're doing very fine despite what the New York Post says". When questioned about his words five days later, he re-affirmed them and stated that "Palestinians are right to resist".

== Vice presidential campaigns ==
In 2008, Puryear ran on the Party for Socialism and Liberation's ticket alongside presidential nominee Gloria La Riva. The La Riva/Puryear slate was on the ballot in six states and received 6,818 total votes.

In July 2015, Puryear was again announced as the running mate of La Riva, the Party for Socialism and Liberation's 2016 presidential nominee. However, he was not eligible to hold the office, as he would not have been at least 35 years old by Inauguration Day. Puryear was critical of the Democratic presidential candidates Hillary Clinton and Bernie Sanders.
