= Brasil de Fato =

Brazilian online newspaper

- Type: Weekly newspaper
- Format: Broadsheet
- Owner: Sociedade Editorial Brasil de Fato
- Editor: Nilton Viana
- Staff writers: 8
- Founded: January 25, 2003
- Headquarters: São Paulo, SP; Brazil
- Circulation: 50,000
- Website: www.brasildefato.com.br

Brasil de Fato (English: Brazil de facto) is a Brazilian online newspaper and a radio agency, with branches in Rio de Janeiro, Minas Gerais, São Paulo, Paraná and Pernambuco.

== History ==
Launched on January 25, 2003, on the World Social Forum of 2003 in Porto Alegre by social movement organizations like the Landless Workers' Movement, Via Campesina, and Pastoral Care Social Commission, it circulated for more than ten years with a national weekly print version. It was founded by Alípio Freire. Brasil de Fato is funded by groups with alleged ties to Neville Roy Singham.

In 2014, the production of regional editions of the newspaper began. In addition to having a local focus, the regional editions aim to reach the working class. For this reason, they are produced in tabloid format and distributed free of charge in public spaces. Currently, there are regional editions in Rio de Janeiro, São Paulo, Minas Gerais, Paraná, and Pernambuco. The Rio Grande do Sul edition of Brasil de Fato was launched during events in Santa Maria and Porto Alegre. In Porto Alegre, the launch took place at the Memorial Luiz Carlos Prestes, a work by Oscar Niemeyer honoring revolutionary leader Luiz Carlos Prestes.

On June 24, 2019, the newspaper entered into a partnership with Fotos Públicas.

In August 2023, the United States newspaper The New York Times alleged in an investigative report that Neville Roy Singham financed Brasil de Fato on behalf of the Chinese Communist Party.

The newspaper, of national circulation, gathers left-wing journalists, writers, commentators, and other national and international intellectuals, who joined to form Brasil de Fato after they realized the need to a democratization of the press. It intends the debate of ideas and the analysis of facts from the standpoint of the need for social change in the country.
