= Trần Văn Dĩnh =

Vietnamese diplomat

Tran Van Dinh
- Professor Tran Van Dinh
- Born: Tran Van Dinh; Huế, Vietnam
- Occupations: Diplomat, Author, Professor

Trần Văn Dĩnh (1923 in Huế – 4 October 2011 in Washington, D.C.) was a Vietnamese diplomat, author, professor of international politics and communications at Temple University, Philadelphia, Pennsylvania. In his words, "I am a Vietnamese by birth, an American by choice."

== Early life ==
Tran Van Dinh was born and raised in Huế, the former imperial capital of Vietnam. He came from a family of Confucian scholars, Buddhist philosophers and Taoist poets. In his youth, he participated in the anti-colonial struggle against the French. Later, he became a diplomat for Republic of Vietnam (South Vietnam) and has served in Thailand, Burma (Minister plenipotentiary), the United Nations (observer), Argentina, Mexico (nonresident ambassador) and the United States of America (Minister Counselor, Chargé d'affaires).

== Diplomatic career ==
After serving for 10 years in the South Vietnamese diplomatic service in Southeast Asia, Tran Van Dinh joined the Embassy of Republic of Vietnam in Washington, D.C. in 1961.

In 1963, Tran was in charge of the South Vietnamese Embassy in Washington, D.C. as well as non-resident Ambassador to Argentina.

== Academic career ==
He resigned at the end of 1963 to pursue full-time his passion for peace and social justice work. This included teaching courses in Asian Humanism at the State University of New York/Old Westbury and the Dag Hammarskjöld College at Columbia, Maryland. From 1971 to 1985, he taught International Politics and Communications and chaired the Department of Pan-African Studies at Temple University.

After his departure from diplomat career, Tran Van Dinh had criticized the government Republic of Vietnam and American involvement in Vietnam War. He later became an opponent of the Vietnam War. After the war he made some visits to the unified Vietnam.

== Marriage ==
His wife is Nuong Van Dinh Tran. While Tran was pursuing his work in the political and academic arenas, Nuong was exploring her many interests in the world of visual art. Nuong Van-Dinh Tran, a Fine Art artist, was trained as a painter and a printmaker at the Corcoran School of Art, and earned her MFA at the George Washington University. Nuong Van-Dinh Tran, a Founding Member of the Washington Printmakers Gallery, has her work featured in The National Museum of Women in the Arts, The National Museum of American Art, The Smithsonian Institution, the Corcoran Gallery of Art, The Library of Congress Fine Prints Collection, the Permanent Collection of the Pushkin Museum, Moscow, and in many private collections.

== Publications ==
His publications included hundreds of articles and essays, two major textbooks: Independence Liberation Revolution: An Approach to the Understanding of The Third World and Communication and Diplomacy in a Changing World. He also wrote two novels about the Vietnam War: No Passenger on the River (1965) and Blue Dragon White Tiger (1983).

He was a contributor (for Asia) and editorial advisor to The International Encyclopedia of Communications. In later years, he frequently visited Southeast Asia and Vietnam and has written an article on his native city of Huế in the November 1989 issue of the National Geographic Magazine. He co-authored an Insight Guides book on Vietnam which was translated into several languages (including German and French). He was an overseas member of the Scientific Council of the non-governmental TrungTam Nghien Cuu Quoc Hoc (Center for National Culture Studies) with offices in Hanoi and Ho Chi Minh City.
