= Jodie Evans =

American activist and filmmaker

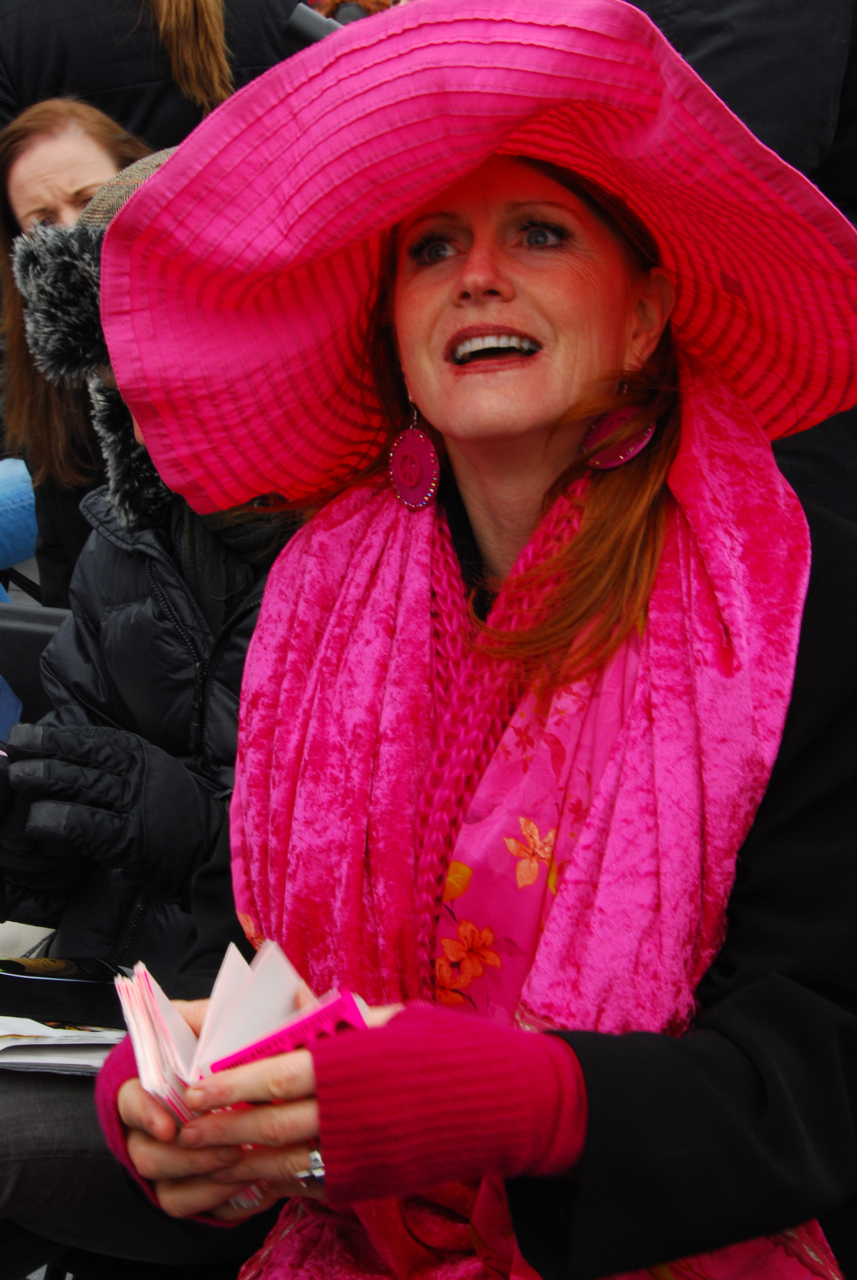
- Evans campaigning in 2009
- Born: September 22, 1954 (age 72); Las Vegas, Nevada, U.S.
- Occupations: Political activist; author; documentary film producer
- Spouse(s): Max Palevsky (???–2010); Neville Roy Singham (married 2017–present)

Jodie Evans (born September 22, 1954) is an American political activist, author, and documentary film producer.

Evans was a Democratic Party political activist who managed the 1992 U.S. presidential campaign of former California governor Jerry Brown. Evans co-founded the women's left-wing anti-war activist organization Code Pink with Medea Benjamin and others. She is a former board chair of Rainforest Action Network.

In 2023, The New York Times published an article detailing the connections between her husband since 2017, Neville Roy Singham, and the Chinese Communist Party, stating that Evans had been critical of China's authoritarian government in 2015. Since 2017, 25% of Code Pink's funding has come from groups connected to Singham. Evans stated in 2023 that she now strongly supports China, and regards it as a defender of the oppressed and a model for economic growth without slavery or war.

== Early life ==
Evans was born and raised in Las Vegas, Nevada. She first became interested in social justice activism when she worked as a maid in a major Las Vegas hotel as a teenager—as her coworkers organized, she marched in favor of a living wage.

== Activism ==
Her CODEPINK protest actions include disrupting Sarah Palin's speech at the 2008 Republican National Convention, and a 2009 protest in Santa Monica against Israeli cosmetics company Ahava. Upon returning from Afghanistan, she delivered signatures from women in that country and the U.S. to President Obama, asking him to send no new troops into the conflict there.

In March 2010, during a book signing by Karl Rove in Beverly Hills, California, she and other Code Pink members caused disruptions. At one point, Evans charged the stage towards Rove with a pair of handcuffs, declaring that she was making a citizen's arrest. On January 30, 2011, Evans was arrested for disruptive behavior at a Rancho Mirage hotel where she was leading a protest against David H. Koch and Charles G. Koch over their financial support of part of the Tea Party Movement.

She is the co-founder and president of the People’s Support Foundation, a nonprofit which was established in 2017 with support of former staff of software company ThoughtWorks.

In 2019, Evans joined actress and activist Jane Fonda in a series of weekly rallies and acts of civil disobedience, called Fire Drill Fridays, at Washington D.C.'s Capitol to highlight the global climate crisis, where Evans was arrested on multiple occasions along with Fonda.

She was an editor of the books Twilight of Empire: Responses to Occupation (2004) (co-editor) and Stop the Next War Now: Effective Responses to Violence and Terrorism (2005) (co-editor).

== Position on China ==
Evans was once critical of China's authoritarian government, making statements such as: "We demand China stop brutal repression of their women's human rights defenders". In a 2023 article, The New York Times wrote that Evans was now a strong supporter of China and regards it as a defender of the oppressed and a model for economic growth without slavery or war. In 2021, during a Code Pink livestream, Evans referenced Syrian Uyghur fighters' ties to al-Qaeda during the Syrian civil war and accused the United States of collaborating with the Kingdom of Saudi Arabia to radicalize them with Wahhabism in order to encourage jihadism in Xinjiang as a way of undermining the Chinese government. When asked if she had anything negative to say about China, Evans initially replied, "I can't, for the life of me, think of anything", but later said she had trouble using China's phone-based payment apps.

In a March 2023 interview with the Chinese Communist Party tabloid Global Times, Evans stated that Americans "have been watching US propaganda, which drives hatred and fear around China." In a podcast for China Global Television Network, Evans stated "China took everyone out of poverty."

== Personal life ==
She was married to Max Palevsky until his death on May 5, 2010. He was her second husband and she was his fourth wife. She currently lives in Venice, California.

In 2017, Evans married tech entrepreneur Neville Roy Singham, a tech entrepreneur who funds a large number of far-left advocacy organizations, political parties, think tanks, and political parties around the world. In 2023, The New York Times published a report accusing him of "close ties" to the Chinese government. Singham denied the accusations.

== Films ==
- Stripped and Teased: Tales from Las Vegas Women (1999) (Producer)
- The Ground Truth: After the Killing Ends (2006) (Executive Producer)
- South Central Farm: Oasis in a Concrete Desert (2008) (Executive Producer)
- The Most Dangerous Man in America: Daniel Ellsberg and the Pentagon Papers (2009) (Executive Producer)
- The People Speak (2009) (Producer)
- Rooted in Peace (2012) (Self)
- The Square (2013) (Executive Producer)
- Gore Vidal: The United States of Amnesia (2013) (Self)
- We Are Many (2014)
- The Yes Men Are Revolting (2014)
- The Brainwashing of My Dad (2015) (Executive Producer)
- This Changes Everything (2015) (Executive Producer)
- Shadow World (2016) (Co-Executive Producer)
- Always in Season (2019) (Co-Executive Producer)

== Organizations and boards ==
Evans is a member of a number of organizations and boards including:

- CODEPINK: Women for Peace (Co-founder)
- California Arts Council
- The People's Forum
- Drug Policy Alliance
- Rainforest Action Network
- Institute for Policy Studies
- World Festival of Sacred Music
- 826LA
- Office of the Americas
- Sisterhood is Global Institute
- Women's Media Center
- Global Girl Media
- Schumacher Center for a New Economics

== Awards ==
- Levantine Cultural Center 2010 East-West Vision of Peace Award
- Progressive Democrats of the Santa Monica Mountains 2008 Tedi Winograd Courage Award - Outside the Party
- Death Penalty Focus 2007 Rose Elizabeth Bird Commitment to Justice Award

== See also ==
- United for Peace and Justice
- List of peace activists
