= Rania Khalek =

American journalist (born 1986)

- Rania Khalek in 2024
- Born: Rania Abdulkhalek; May 27, 1986 (age 40); United States
- Occupation: Journalist
- Years active: 2010s–present
- Website: raniakhalek.com

Rania Abdulkhalek (Arabic: رانيا عبد الخالق; born May 27, 1986), known as Rania Khalek, is an American journalist, video host, and presenter. She hosts the program Dispatches on BreakThrough News and has contributed to The Nation, The Grayzone, The Intercept, Fairness & Accuracy in Reporting, The Electronic Intifada, RT, Salon, MintPress News and others.

== Early life ==
She was born and raised in the United States, where her Lebanese Druze parents had migrated to in the late 1970s. While a high school sophomore in Northern Virginia, Khalek said she was first discriminated against due to her Arabic background as a result of the rise of Islamophobia and anti-Arab racism after the September 11 attacks.

== Career ==
=== "The Case for Reparations" ===
Khalek criticized Ta-Nehisi Coates at a public speaking event following the publication of his 2014 article "The Case for Reparations" in The Atlantic, specifically criticizing a segment that praised the reparations payments of the German government to the State of Israel as a model for reparations. He later recalled of the incident, speaking after the publication of his 2024 book The Message in which he criticizes Zionism and Israel: "I remember there was a woman who got on the mic and yelled about the role of Palestinians in that article." He continued, saying, "I couldn't quite understand what she was saying. I mean, I heard her, but I literally could not understand it. She got shouted down. And I've thought about that a lot, man. I've thought about that a lot." In response, Khalek wrote: "Wow, it turns out I played a role in pushing Ta-Nehisi Coates to look more deeply into Palestine," and asked anyone reading who knew him to say "thank you for listening and for his willingness to learn and speak out."

=== 2016 visit to Syria ===
As part of a month-long reporting trip to Syria, Khalek was scheduled to attend a conference in Damascus organized by the British Syrian Society, an organization founded by Bashar al-Assad's father-in-law, Fawaz Akhras. Khalek said she was attending the conference as an independent journalist, along with journalists from The New York Times, The Washington Post, The New Yorker, Channel 4 and National Public Radio and had agreed to "speak for five to ten minutes at a workshop with other journalists summarizing an article [she] wrote about sanctions". Khalek was criticized for agreeing to speak at a two day workshop at the conference, with Chris Doyle of the Council for Arab-British Understanding, stating it was "wrong to take part" in a "propaganda conference." Khalek's co-worker at The Electronic Intifada, Charlotte Silver, said Khalek's decision to participate was an error of judgment. Journalist Oz Katerji said that The Electronic Intifada 's co-founder, Laurie King, wrote on Facebook that Khalek's trip to Syria "disgusts" her. Khalek resigned from her job as an editor of the website amidst the criticism. She decided not to attend the conference and continued her reporting trip around Syria.

=== 2019 visit to Syria ===
In September 2019, Khalek visited Syria to attend the 3rd International Trade Union Forum, sponsored by the Syrian government. Also attending were Max Blumenthal, Yasemin Zahra, a representative of US Labor Against the War, Paul Larudee, head of the Syrian Solidarity Movement and Ajamu Baraka. In an opinion article for Al Jazeera, Muhammad Idrees Ahmad criticized Khalek for inviting her social media fans to admire the "Breathtaking View in Syria" in an image geotagged Saydnaya. According to Bellingcat journalist Nick Waters, from where she was standing, Khalek would have been able to see the Saydnaya prison, a site where 13,000 people were executed between 2011 and 2015 according to Amnesty International. Idrees Ahmad said Khalek's caption was "about as seemly as inviting viewers to admire a stunning sunset over Auschwitz". According to Scottish-Egyptian activist and writer Sam Hamad, writing in The New Arab, Khalek and Blumenthal were "literally part of the same propaganda machine utilized by Assad and Russia to fully normalize their genocide".

=== Piers Morgan Uncensored ===
She has appeared as a guest on Piers Morgan's talk show Piers Morgan Uncensored. On May 12, 2024, she appeared with Emily Schrader, Elica Le Bon and Thomas Hand and on September 23, 2024, she appeared with Alan Dershowitz and Gideon Levy.
