= Code Pink =

US pacifist, anti-war organization

Code Pink: Women for Peace
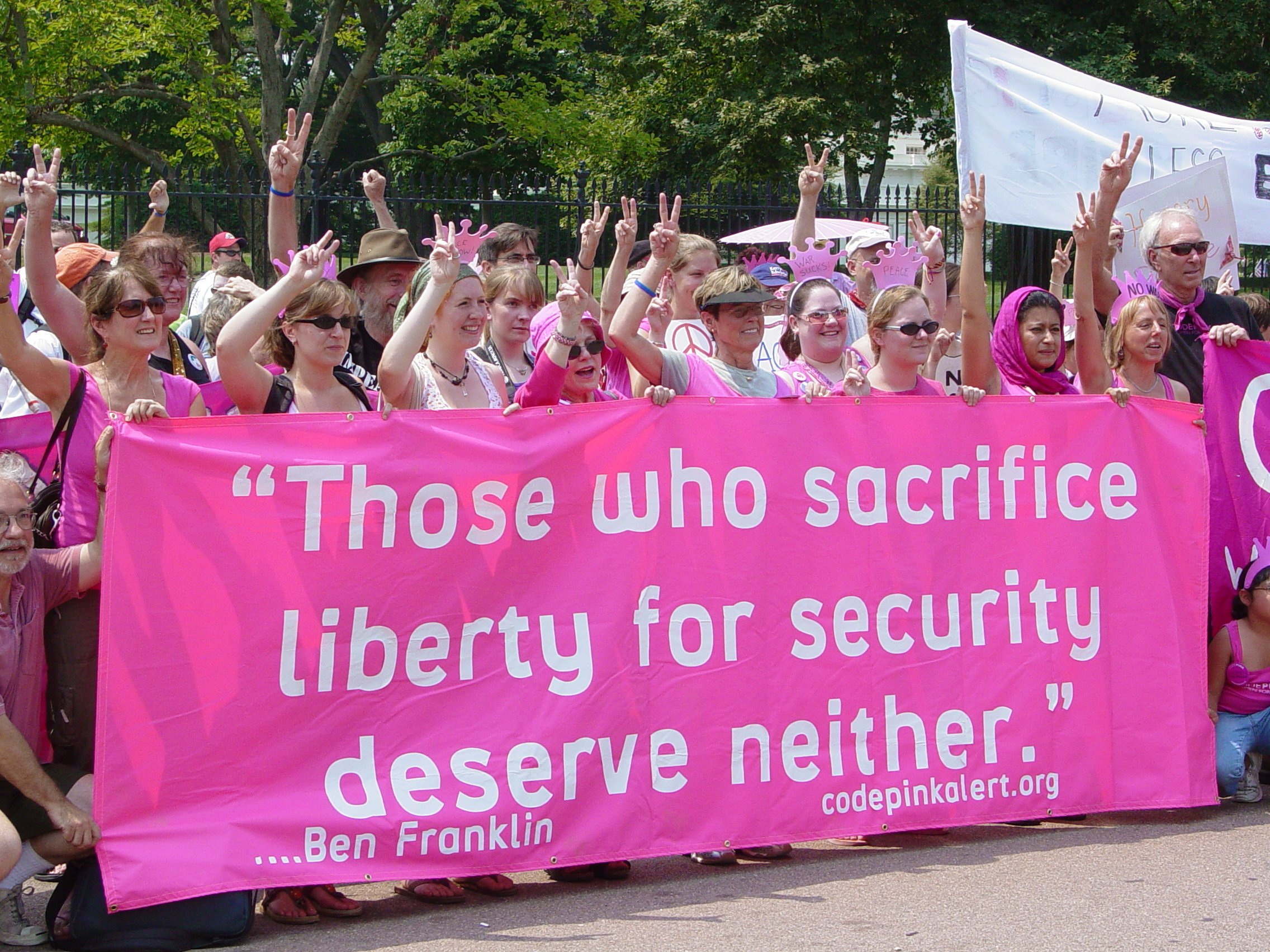
- Code Pink activists demonstrate in front of the White House on July 4, 2006.
- Formation: November 17, 2002; 23 years ago
- Type: 501(c)(3) organization
- Tax ID no.: 26-2823386
- Key people: Jodie Evans, Medea Benjamin
- Affiliations: Progressive International; International Peoples' Assembly
- Website: www.codepink.org

Code Pink: Women for Peace (often stylized as CODEPINK) is a pacifist, anti-war organization registered in the United States as a 501(c)(3) organization. It focuses on issues such as drone strikes, the Guantanamo Bay detention camp, Palestinian statehood, the Iran nuclear deal, human rights in Saudi Arabia, and peace on the Korean Peninsula. The organization has regional offices in Los Angeles, California, and Washington, D.C., and several chapters in the U.S. and abroad.

With members wearing the group's signature pink color, Code Pink has conducted marches, protests, and other activist action in order to promote its goals. The organization describes itself as female-initiated, but it encourages men to participate in its activities. The organization's political positions, especially those regarding China and Venezuela, and funding have created controversy and drawn congressional scrutiny. Since 2017, roughly 25% of the organization's funding has come from groups connected to Neville Roy Singham, the husband of Code Pink's co-founder Jodie Evans.

== History ==
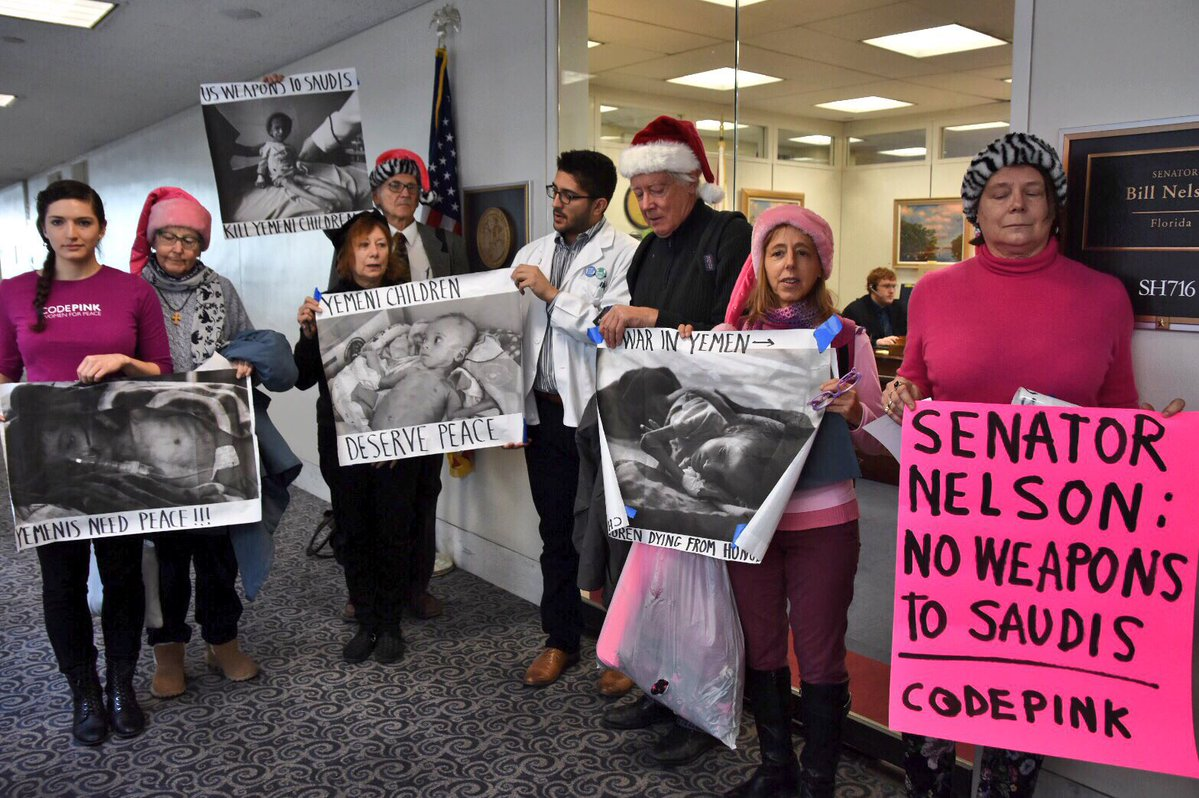
Code Pink activists protest Democratic senators who supported the Saudi Arabian-led intervention in Yemen, December 2017.

Code Pink was founded on November 17, 2002, by a group of American anti-war activists, including Jodie Evans and Medea Benjamin, in the lead-up to the 2003 US invasion of Iraq (which the organization opposed). The group's name is a play on the United States Department of Homeland Security's color-coded alert system in which, for example, Code Orange and Code Red signify the highest levels of danger. Code Pink's founding statement calls for

Women around the world to rise up and oppose the war in Iraq. We call on mothers, grandmothers, sisters, and daughters, on workers, students, teachers, healers, artists, writers, singers, poets and every ordinary outraged woman willing to be outrageous for peace. Women have been the guardians of life – not because we are better or purer or more innately nurturing than men, but because the men have busied themselves making war.

In February 2003, shortly before the invasion of Iraq, Code Pink organized its first trip to the country; it subsequently led five delegations there. These delegations included parents of American soldiers killed in combat in Iraq, as well as parents of active soldiers. Additionally, they brought six Iraqi women on a tour of the United States, and published a report about how the U.S. occupation affected the status of Iraqi women.

On its website, Code Pink lists allegations of U.S. war crimes, and states that thousands of civilians were killed in Fallujah in 2004 due to the actions of the U.S. military. Along with other groups, they gave over $600,000-worth of humanitarian aid to refugees of Fallujah in 2004. In 2014, Code Pink was awarded the US Peace Prize by the US Peace Memorial Foundation "in recognition of inspirational anti-war leadership and creative grassroots activism".

== Funding ==
In 2023 it was reported that since 2017, more than $1.4 million of Code Pink's donations (about 25% of its funding) have come from two groups connected to Neville Roy Singham, who married Code Pink's co-founder Jodie Evans in 2017. In 2022, the Benjamin Fund contributed $355,350.

=== Arc of Justice ===
In August 2026, the state government of California ordered the charity "Arc of Justice" a California-based non-profit founded by Medea Benjamin which partially financed Code Pink's operations to cease operations after failing to file taxes for three consecutive years and account for more than $51 million in assets. Arc of Justice reportedly funded Code Pink with more than two million dollars from the years 2009 until 2022 while Benjamin was running Arc of Justice and serving as Code Pink's treasurer simultaneously.

== Political positions and activism ==
=== United States ===
The group opposed the United States invasion of Iraq. In early 2003, members of Code Pink protested what they called the "naked aggression" of U.S. President George W. Bush by spelling out the word "PEACE" using their naked bodies at demonstrations in California and New York. Code Pink participated in vigils at the Walter Reed Army Medical Center in Washington, D.C., to shed light on the plight of injured soldiers. Code Pink said that the purpose of the vigils was to highlight the lack of care for veterans and that the vigils have helped achieve improvements in that care.

In the summer of 2009, Code Pink began their "Ground the Drones" campaign. This campaign was a response to the Obama administration's continued and increased use of drones in the war on terror, specifically in regions surrounding Pakistan and Afghanistan. Code Pink said that many of the drone strikes intended to target terrorist leaders and strongholds often miss their targets, causing the unnecessary deaths of innocent civilians.

"Ground the Drones" was fashioned as a form of non-violent, civil disobedience, similar to protests earlier that spring, by groups such as Voices for Creative Non Violence. Code Pink targeted Creech Air Force Base in Indian Springs, Nevada, claiming it was the "epicenter" for controlling drone activity. The goal of the protest was "halting unmanned aircraft strikes controlled via satellite links from Creech and other bases". The group continued protesting at Creech AFB through November and December 2009. Code Pink returned to Creech AFB in October 2011, along with other protest groups, to mark the 10th anniversary of the war in Afghanistan. Protesters dubbed it the "largest anti-war demonstration ever at Creech Air Force Base. Code Pink members attended a Senate Armed Services Committee hearing in 2015 and called for Henry Kissinger's arrest for war crimes. John McCain, who was chairing the hearing, called for the Sergeant at Arms and the Capital Hill Police to escort Code Pink out of the building and called after them "Get out of here you lowlife scum!"

Code Pink member Desiree Fairooz was arrested for laughing after a description of Senator Jeff Sessions by Alabama U.S. Senator Richard Shelby of the nominee, that his history "treating all Americans equally under the law is clear and well-documented", during the January 2017 confirmation hearing as United States Attorney General. After she had been convicted at trial, that verdict was reversed by the chief District Court Judge Robert Morin. The judge said Fairooz should not have been tried for laughing, only for speaking out as she was being removed, and called a mistrial. Instead of dismissing the case, Morin set her retrial for September. Fairooz faced up to a year in prison and $2,000 in fines for disruptive and disorderly conduct and obstructing and impeding passage on US Capitol grounds. On November 6, 2017, District of Columbia U.S. Attorney Jessie K. Liu filed a notice of nolle prosequi in the case against Desiree Fairooz. Upon the decision, Code Pink released a statement calling the three trials a waste of time and tens of thousands of taxpayer dollars, adding, "These sentences are designed to discourage dissent and prevent activists from engaging in the daily protests that are taking place during a tumultuous time."

During the COVID-19 pandemic, Code Pink campaigned in favor of the United States suspending its imposition of sanctions in order to alleviate the pandemic's impact on the populations of sanctioned countries. On World Press Freedom Day 2023, members of Code Pink interrupted a talk between U.S. Secretary of State Antony Blinken and Washington Post columnist David Ignatius to call for the release of Julian Assange.

=== Venezuela ===
During the 2019 Venezuelan presidential crisis, the U.S. broke relations with the Nicolás Maduro administration and recognized Juan Guaidó as the acting president of Venezuela. On April 10, 2019, after the Maduro administration retired its diplomats from the Venezuelan embassy in Washington, US activists from Code Pink received keycards from the diplomats, moved into the building, and secured all entrances with chains and locks as Carlos Vecchio, Guaidó's ambassador appointed to the US, tried to gain access to the building. The US government considered the embassy as property of Guaidó's interim government. Clashes in May 2019 between US activists and pro-Guaidó Venezuelan demonstrators resulted in arrests on both sides. US authorities issued an eviction notice on the group on May 14. The last four activists were removed from the embassy by agents from the US State Department's Diplomatic Security Service and the US Secret Service on May 16.

At the end of July 2019, some members of Code Pink that occupied the embassy visited Venezuela during the Foro de São Paulo. Maduro posed for pictures with the group and rewarded them with gifts, including a book on Simón Bolívar and a replica of Bolívar's sword. In October 2022, Code Pink collected signatures for a petition asking the U.S. Department of Justice to drop the charges against Colombian businessman Alex Saab. Saab was extradited to the U.S. from Cape Verde in 2020, charged by the U.S. Department of Justice with money laundering and pushing over $350 million through U.S. accounts. Code Pink described Saab as a political prisoner, who worked as a diplomat as part of Venezuela's Gran Misión Vivienda and CLAP food box distribution network. The organization has been criticized for its support of the Venezuelan government.

=== Israel and Palestine ===
Code Pink has organized more than seven delegations to Gaza, some of them at the invitation of the United Nations. Code Pink was criticized by Joshua Block, president and CEO of the Israel Project, for arranging a peace delegation to Iran in January 2019.

Prior to the Gaza Freedom March, Code Pink endorsed the "Cairo Declaration to End Israeli Apartheid", which calls for comprehensive boycott of Israel. During the march, Code Pink co-founder Medea Benjamin coordinated the organization's stay with Hamas. Members resided in the Commodore, a Hamas-owned hotel in Gaza City. Hamas security officials accompanied activists as they visited Palestinian homes and Gaza-based NGOs. Prior to the march, Benjamin said the Hamas government had "pledged to ensure our safety". However, Code Pink leaders claimed Hamas had hijacked the initiative from the onset after imposing prohibitions on the organization's movements around Gaza. Amira Hass referred to the event as "an opportunity for Hamas cabinet ministers to get decent media coverage in the company of Western demonstrators".

Code Pink helped to organize an International Women's Day Delegation to Gaza in March 2014. Upon arrival at the Cairo airport on March 3, 2014, Benjamin was detained and assaulted by Egyptian authorities. She was deported to Turkey after the authorities had dislocated her shoulder. Other members of the international delegation, including American, French, Belgian, and British citizens, who arrived the next day were also deported. Some members made it into Cairo, although no one from the delegation made it to Gaza. Code Pink opposed Israel's operation in Gaza following the October 7 attacks. It repeatedly disrupted Secretary of State Antony Blinken's October 31, 2023 testimony to a Senate hearing on Israel aid from the United States, with protesters calling for a ceasefire during the hearing. Several peace activists were arrested, including David Barrows and retired colonel and diplomat, Ann Wright.

=== Syria ===
In 2013 about ten activists of Code Pink demonstrated in U.S. Congress against military attacks in retaliation for the Syrian government's use of chemical weapons against its own people. A year later, Code Pink activists demonstrated in Capitol Hill against the American intervention in Syria and Iraq to stop ISIS.

=== Iran ===
In March 2019, while visiting Iran, Code Pink representatives voiced support at a press conference held by Fars News for Iran's right to use missile defense systems, and met with Iranian foreign minister Mohammad Javad Zarif.

=== Iraq ===
Following the January 2020 assassination of Qasem Soleimani, leader of the Islamic Revolutionary Guard Corps' Quds Force, and of Abu Mahdi al-Muhandis, leader of Iraq's Popular Mobilization Forces by a US drone attack at Baghdad airport, Code Pink together with a number of other civil society groups called for a "national day of action" in 30 large U.S. cities to request the withdrawal of U.S. troops from Iraq. Thousands marched in over 80 cities across the country to protest against a possible war against Iran.

=== Russian invasion of Ukraine ===
In 2022, at protests in Oakland and San Francisco, Code Pink criticized the United States for sending arms to Ukraine after the Russian invasion of Ukraine. In February 2023, Code Pink activists confronted United States President Joe Biden in a Washington, D.C. restaurant, "call[ing] for Biden to seek peace and an end to the war rather than escalation before being asked to leave by the establishment's staff". During the Washington, D.C. protest, Code Pink also called for Cuba to be removed from the United States state sponsors of terrorism list.

Writing in The Nation, Ukrainian Solidarity Network co-founder Bill Fletcher Jr. describes Code Pink's position as "ambivalent" stating that the organization has criticized the Russian invasion but not supported Ukrainian resistance. In October 2023, Steven Strauss of the Freedom Socialist Party alleged that he and another supporter were removed from a Washington, D.C., event hosted by Code Pink after the pair handed out flyers supporting Ukraine's right to defend itself.

On October 4, 2023, 11 protestors from Code Pink occupied the Dirksen Senate Office Building office of Senator Bernie Sanders. The protestors called for Ukrainian, Russian, and U.S. leadership to negotiate an end to the war. Code Pink's press release quoted a protestor's statement, "Yes, Bernie should condemn the Russian invasion, but he should also be calling for a negotiated end to this brutal war". Capitol police arrested the 11 protestors based on a provision of the District of Columbia Code that prohibits crowding, obstructing or incommoding. Republican U.S. Representative Marjorie Taylor Greene praised the protesters, writing, "We don't agree on most things, but we do agree Congress should STOP fueling the war in Ukraine!"

=== China ===
Jodie Evans was once critical of China's authoritarian government. In 2015 she wrote: "We demand China stop brutal repression of their women's human rights defenders". In 2021, Evans described the Uyghurs as terrorists and defended China's mass internment of them. In August 2023, The New York Times wrote that Evans is now a strong supporter of China and she regards it as a defender of the oppressed and a model for economic growth without slavery or war.

In 2020, Code Pink started its "China Is Not Our Enemy" campaign. New Lines Magazine reported in April 2022 that Code Pink's website linked to a video featuring Evans and British academic John Ross, who characterized the Uyghur genocide allegation as "farcical" and a "total lie".

In a February 2023 Washington Examiner editorial, Michael Rubin criticized Code Pink for what he called denials of the Uyghur genocide and thereby "amplify[ing] Chinese government propaganda".

In February 2023, two Code Pink protesters attempted to disrupt the inaugural hearing of the U.S. House Select Committee on Strategic Competition between the United States and the Chinese Communist Party, by holding up a sign stating, "China is not our enemy", and shouting. According to Code Pink's statement on the protest, "Our common enemy is the climate crisis – we need cooperation, not competition, to address climate change and the challenges we face together as humanity." In June 2023, Code Pink activists visited the offices of the House Select Committee on Strategic Competition between the United States and the Chinese Communist Party where, according to an aide of House member Seth Moulton, they denied accusations of forced labor in Xinjiang and suggested Moulton visit Xinjiang.

Following the August 2023 New York Times report, U.S. Senator Marco Rubio asked the U.S. Department of Justice to open an investigation into Code Pink and other entities related to Singham for potential violations of the Foreign Agents Registration Act (FARA). In November 2023, the U.S. House Committee on Natural Resources announced an investigation into Code Pink due to the organization's "potential ties to the Chinese Communist Party". In 2025, Senate Judiciary Committee Chair Chuck Grassley urged the Department of Justice to investigate whether the organization is obligated to register as under the Foreign Agents Registration Act (FARA) due to their alleged ties to the Chinese Communist Party.

In April 2025, the coordinator of Code Pink's "China Is Not Our Enemy" campaign has said the organization is not funded by the Chinese Communist Party, that the organization supports diplomatic solutions to human rights issues and that "The Uyghur people must not be used to justify war."

In August 2026, the United States government alleged that Code Pink received funding from the Chinese Communist Party which also aided and abetted with Code Pink sponsored pro-Palestine marches in the United Kingdom. Medea Benjamin a co-founder of Code Pink has said that the organization receives no funding from China.

=== Cuba ===
Code Pink opposes the United States embargo against Cuba and supports warmer Cuba–United States relations. In 2026, amidst the 2026 Cuban crisis caused by the US blockade, Code Pink organized a delegation in collaboration with Progressive International to Cuba which delivered 6,300 pounds of medical supplies. Some in the Cuban dissident movement expressed concerns that the Cuban government would commandeer the aid delivered by the convoy. In 2026, it was reported by multiple outlets that Code Pink was under investigation by the State, Justice and Treasury Department for assisting a State Sponsor of Terror because of their delegation to Cuba.

== Analysis ==
In 2007, political scientist Rachel V. Kutz-Flamenbaum described Code Pink as a group whose protest actions "imply that women's traditional roles as mothers and caregivers give women the moral authority and moral obligation to fight against violence". According to Kutz-Flamenbaum, Code Pink draws attention to the differential impact of war on women, and challenges "gender norms by explicitly and implicitly critiquing the relationship between militarism and patriarchy". She has argued that the group's reliance on gendered symbolism—positioning women as moral guardians—has attracted both praise and criticism. According to historian Samuel Moyn, Code Pink lost significant support after the election of Barack Obama, since it continued to oppose U.S. military interventions regardless of the administration in power.

== Notable members ==
- Medea Benjamin, co-founder, political activist, author of books on U.S. foreign policy, and president of the Benjamin Fund
- Jodie Evans, co-founder, longtime activist, and fundraiser with prior experience in Democratic Party politics
- Ann Wright, retired U.S. Army colonel and former diplomat, active in Code Pink's anti-war campaigns

== See also ==
- Anti-war movement
- Feminist Peace Network
- List of anti-war organizations
- List of peace activists
- Raging Grannies
- Women's International League for Peace and Freedom
