= Vijay Prashad =

Indian historian and writer (born 1967)

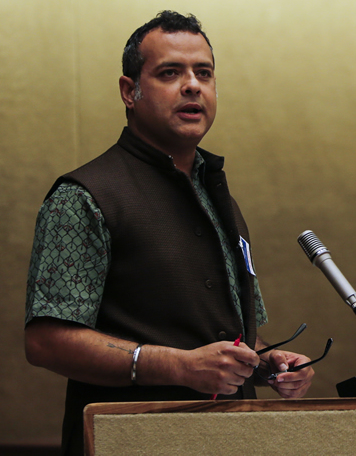
- Prashad in 2010
- Born: 1967 (age 58–59); Kolkata, India
- Education: Pomona College (BA); University of Chicago (PhD)
- Relatives: Brinda Karat (aunt); Baini Prashad (grandfather)
- Website: thetricontinental.org

Vijay Prashad (born 1967) is an Indian Marxist historian, journalist, political commentator, and editor. He is the executive director of the Tricontinental Institute for Social Research, editor of LeftWord Books, writing fellow and chief correspondent at Globetrotter, and a senior non-resident fellow at the Renmin University of China's Chongyang Institute for Financial Studies. Prashad is known for his criticisms of capitalism, neocolonialism, American exceptionalism, and Western imperialism, and his support for communism and the Global South.

== Personal life and education ==
Vijay Prashad was born and raised in Kolkata, India. His grandfather was the scientist and translator Baini Prashad and his aunt is Marxist Indian politician Brinda Karat.

He attended The Doon School as a child. He records that he was subjected to violent rape in his early teens while at school.

He received a BA from Pomona College in 1989 as well as a PhD from the University of Chicago in 1994, writing a dissertation under the supervision of Bernard Cohn.

Prashad is queer and supports LGBT rights. He was married to Women’s Studies scholar Elisabeth Armstrong, with whom he has four children. They divorced in 2024.

== Career ==
Prashad was the George and Martha Kellner Chair in South Asian History and a professor of international studies at Trinity College in Hartford, Connecticut, from 1996 to 2017.

Prashad has provided political commentary for Monthly Review. and Salon. He has had three articles published in The Nation.

He is an advisory board member of the US Campaign for the Academic and Cultural Boycott of Israel, part of the Boycott, Divestment and Sanctions (BDS) movement, and co-founder of the Forum of Indian Leftists (FOIL).

Prashad said that Noam Chomsky was "a great mentor to me", having co-authored two books with the well-known linguist. When details of Chomsky's friendship with Jeffrey Epstein were revealed in the Epstein files, Prashad said he was "disgusted by Epstein’s paedophilia, and so by Noam’s friendship with him", adding that "[t]here is no defence for this, in my view, no context that can explain this outrage."

== Political views ==
Vijay Prashad is a proponent of democracy, Marxism, socialism, and communism.

Criticism of capitalism is a recurrent theme throughout his work, in addition to criticisms of imperialism, colonialism, neocolonialism.

=== U.S. foreign policy ===
Prashad is a critic of American hegemony and imperialism.

He debated historian Juan Cole on the 2011 NATO-led military intervention in Libya, which Cole supported. Prashad argued that the genuine Libyan uprising had been "usurped" by various malicious actors, including some with CIA connections. Prashad wrote the 2012 book Arab Spring, Libyan Winter, released through AK Press, on the topic.

=== Mother Teresa and Western charity ===
Prashad analyzed Mother Teresa's missionary work in Kolkata as representative of the collective "bourgeois guilt" of Western nations. For example, he states that the Bhopal disaster, which was caused by Union Carbide, was a flagrant example of a transnational corporation's disregard for human life in defence of its own profit. After the disaster, Mother Teresa flew into Bhopal and, escorted in two government cars, offered Bhopal's victims small aluminium medals of St. Mary. "This could have been an accident," she told the survivors, and "it is important to forgive." Prashad argued that people like Mother Teresa obscure the inherent tragedies of capitalism.

He also commented on Mother Teresa's alleged links with the American businessman Charles Keating and Michèle Bennett, the wife of the Haitian dictator Jean-Claude Duvalier. He also wrote that the communists of Calcutta were the "real nameless Mother Teresas who conduct the necessary work towards socialism, for the elimination of poverty forever."

=== Resignation of Evo Morales ===
Prashad has written extensively about the 2019 Bolivian political crisis and the 2020 Bolivian general election. He described Evo Morales' removal from the presidency as a coup d'état and said the Organization of American States had legitimized the coup through unsubstantiated conclusions in its preliminary report. In March 2020, he wrote that Morales' removal from office was the result of his government's "socialist policy toward Bolivia's resources" which required that returns from mining resources such as lithium "be properly shared with the Bolivian people." He said that the government of Jeanine Áñez extended a "welcome mat" to Tesla to establish a factory in Bolivia for the manufacturing of lithium batteries from Bolivia's reserves.

=== Boycott of Israeli universities ===
In 2010, when Prashad was appointed to head the newly formed Trinity Institute for Interdisciplinary Studies at Trinity College, a group of professors wrote a letter protesting the appointment based on "the prominent role he has played in promoting a boycott of Israeli universities and of study abroad in Israel." After initially refusing to meet with them, college president James Jones eventually met with representatives from the Connecticut Jewish Federation, the Anti-Defamation League, and the Jewish Federation of Greater Hartford on 14 September 2010. The university backed Prashad and rejected attempts to rescind his appointment.

=== Persecution of Uyghurs ===
In April 2021, Prashad authored an article for Globetrotter in which he wrote that the diplomatic boycott of China based on the persecution of Uyghurs was an American disinformation campaign designed to create hostilities between the two nations: "The U.S. government's information warfare against China has produced the 'fact' that there is genocide in Xinjiang [...] Once this has been established, it helps develop diplomatic and economic warfare." On an episode of The Zero Hour with RJ Eskow, Prashad stated there was no evidence that the Chinese government's actions constituted genocide.

In response to a New Lines Magazine article's accusation of genocide denial, Prashad wrote that he had never written about China's treatment of ethnic Uyghurs and other Turkic Muslim populations in Xinjiang. He said he had only commented on The Zero Hour that he "did not believe there was reliable evidence or investigation to meet the high legal burden of genocide under international law" and that his remarks corresponded with similar statements by figures such as former UN advisor Jeffrey Sachs and the former president of the International Association of Genocide Scholars William Schabas, as well as the US State Department's Office of the Legal Adviser.

In April 2026, Prashad co-authored an article in Monthly Review contending that the Uyghurs were not victims of genocide. According to Australian historian David Brophy, the article whitewashed Chinese government crimes and contained "fake sourcing" from the use of AI.

== Reception ==
Historian Paul Buhle has described Prashad as "a literary phenomenon." Writer and journalist Amitava Kumar wrote: "Prashad is our own Frantz Fanon. His writing of protest is always tinged with the beauty of hope."

Prashad has come under scrutiny for his association with Neville Roy Singham, who has been accused of funding and promoting pro-Chinese government messaging and causes via a network of organizations (including the Tricontinental Institute, The People's Forum, BreakThrough News and NewsClick). Prashad has responded to the criticism, characterizing it as an attempt "to conjure a conspiracy from something that is no secret at all" as well as a pretended "scoop based on public statements that I – and others – have made."

== Selected publications ==
As author

- (2000) The Karma of Brown Folk. University of Minnesota Press. ISBN 978-0816634385.
- (2002) Untouchable Freedom: A Social History of a Dalit Community. Oxford University Press. ISBN 978-0195658484.
- (2002) War Against the Planet: The Fifth Afghan War, Imperialism and Other Assorted Fundamentalism Manohar. ISBN 978-8187496199.
- (2002) Fat Cats and Running Dogs: The Enron Stage of Capitalism. Zed Books. ISBN 978-1842772614.
- (2002) Everybody Was Kung Fu Fighting: Afro-Asian Connections and the Myth of Cultural Purity. Beacon Press. ISBN 978-0807050118.
- (2003) Namaste Sharon: Hindutva and Sharonism under US Hegemony. New Delhi: LeftWord Books. ISBN 8187496355.
- (2003) Keeping up with the Dow Joneses: Stocks, Jails, Welfare. Boston: South End Press. ISBN 978-0896086890.
- (2007) The Darker Nations: A People's History of the Third World. The New Press. ISBN 978-1565847859.
- (2011) Marx's Capital: An Introductory Reader. Contributed by Vijay Prashad, Venkatesh Athreya, Prasenjit Bose, Prabhat Patnaik, Jayati Ghosh, T. Jayaraman, R. Ramakumar. LeftWord. ISBN 978-93-80118-00-0.
- (2012) Arab Spring, Libyan Winter. AK Press. ISBN 978-1849351126.
- (2012) Uncle Swami: South Asians in America Today. The New Press. ISBN 978-1595587848.
- (2013) Poorer Nations: A Possible History of the Global South. Verso Books. Foreword by Boutros Boutros-Ghali.
- (2015) No Free Left: The Futures of Indian Communism. New Delhi: LeftWord Books.
- (2015) Letters to Palestine. Verso Books.
- (2016) The Death of the Nation and the Future of the Arab Revolution. University of California Press. ISBN 978-0520293250.
- (2017) Red October: The Russian Revolution and the Communist Horizon. New Delhi: LeftWord Books.
- (2017) Will the Flower Slip Through the Asphalt: Writers Respond to Climate Change. New Delhi: LeftWord Books.
- (2019) Red Star Over the Third World. Pluto Press. ISBN 978-0745339665.
- (2020) Washington Bullets. New Delhi: LeftWord Books. ISBN 978-8194592525. Preface by Evo Morales Ayma.
- (2022) Struggle Makes Us Human: Learning from Movements for Socialism, edited by Frank Barat. Haymarket Books. ISBN 978-1642596908.
- (2022) The Withdrawal: Iraq, Libya, Afghanistan, and the Fragility of U.S. Power, with Noam Chomsky. The New Press. ISBN 978-1620977606. Foreword by Angela Davis.
- (2024) On Cuba: Reflections on 70 Years of Revolution and Struggle, with Noam Chomsky. The New Press. ISBN 978-1620978573. Foreword by Miguel Díaz-Canel.

As editor

- (2016) Communist Histories, vol. 1. New Delhi: LeftWord Books.
- (2017) Land of Blue Helmets: the United Nations in the Arab World, co-edited with Karim Makdisi. University of California Press.
- (2017) Red October: The Russian Revolution and the Communist Horizon, New Delhi: LeftWord Books.
- (2019) The East Was Read: Socialist Culture in the Third World, New Delhi: LeftWord Books.
