= Christine Jennings =

American businesswoman and politician

Chair of the Sarasota County Democratic Party
- In office 2016 – December 17, 2022
- Succeeded by: Daniel Kuether

President of the Sarasota Film Festival
- In office 2020 – 2021
- Preceded by: Mark Famiglio
- Succeeded by: Mark Famiglio

Chairman, CEO, and President of Sarasota Bank
- In office 1992 – December 4, 2003
- Preceded by: Bank established
- Succeeded by: Bank merged with Colonial Bank

Personal details
- Born: November 26, 1945 (age 80) New Boston, Ohio
- Party: Democratic
- Occupation: President/founder/CEO, Sarasota Bank

Christine Jennings (born November 26, 1945) is a banker and businesswoman, and a Democratic politician in Florida. She formerly served as the chair of the Sarasota County Democratic Party.

In 2006, Jennings was the Democratic nominee for the United States Congress to represent Florida's 13th congressional district. The seat was left open when incumbent Katherine Harris ran for the U.S. Senate.

In the 2006 election, 237,861 votes were cast, but for unknown reasons, 18,382 of the electronic ballots in Sarasota County recorded no vote for a congressional candidate. By the tally of the remaining votes, Jennings received 373 fewer votes than her opponent, Republican Vern Buchanan. Of the counted votes in Sarasota County, Jennings won 52.8%. If the missing votes had broken for Jennings by the same percentage as the counted votes in Sarasota County, the Democrat would have won the race by about 600 votes instead of losing by 368, according to a review by the Sarasota Herald-Tribune.

An audit of the machines found nothing wrong, and it is believed that some voters failed to vote for the congressional candidate because it was on the same page as the crowded governor's race. Other voters who failed to vote in the congressional race initially were able to catch the mistake on the review page of the ballot. Still others, who had voted, noticed their votes had not been recorded when they reviewed the votes at the end. There has been no explanation as to why some votes did not record after they were made.

Jennings, a former Republican, never graduated from college and started her career as a bank teller at the age of 17. In 1992, she founded Sarasota Bank, which was bought by Colonial Bank in 2003 for $40.5 million.

In her career as a banker, Jennings rose to become president, CEO, chairman of the board and director of Sarasota Bank. She also served as president of the Sarasota Downtown Association and president of the Sarasota Film Festival.

== Congressional elections ==
=== 2004 ===
Jennings lost the 2004 primary for the seat to the eventual nominee, Jan Schneider, by 47% to 38% in a four-candidate race, despite outspending Schneider by a ratio of nearly 4 to 1. "Her supporters attribute this outcome, though, to Jennings's late start, and they say her business background gives her both better cross-party appeal and stronger fundraising potential."

=== 2006 ===
Jennings won 61.8% of the vote in the September 5, 2006 Democratic primary, having heavily outraised Schneider during the campaign. CQPolitics.com wrote that while Schneider had run game challenges to Harris as the Democratic nominee in 2002 and 2004, "[her] strongest appeal was to more liberal elements of the 13th District constituency, and many Democratic officials thought Jennings's business background would make her a more viable general election contender".

Poll numbers showed Jennings with a lead, which varied from 2–12% based on five polls.

In November, Jennings faced Republican Vern Buchanan, who won a bitterly fought Republican primary with 32.3% of the vote. Buchanan's fund-raising receipts more than tripled those of Jennings, including infusions of nearly $6 million of his own money. Jennings was endorsed by the Sarasota Herald-Tribune, the major newspaper in District 13.

After the votes were counted, Buchanan narrowly led Jennings by fewer than four hundred votes. In Sarasota County, Florida, there were almost 18,000 undervotes in the race. Some advocated for a revote, but that rarely occurs in Florida, and would have been a first in Florida for the federal office.

In March 2007 a letter surfaced "in which Electronic Systems & Software Inc. (ES&S)— the company that manufactured the electronic voting machines used in the Florida 13 election—told election officials that the voting screens exhibited slow response times during testing." The following week "California Democratic Rep. Juanita Millender-McDonald, chairwoman of the House Administration Committee ... announced the formation of the task force" to investigate the election.

The House committee dismissed Jennings's challenge on February 25, 2008, and affirmed the certified result of the FL-13 declaring Buchanan the winner of the 2006 election. The full House of Representatives affirmed the committee's findings in HR 989, declaring that machine error could not be demonstrated after a Government Accountability Office (GAO) review in Sarasota. Jennings dropped her challenge to the race shortly after to focus on her 2008 Congressional rematch against Buchanan.

=== 2008 ===
Jennings announced her intention to run for the 13th District seat once again in 2008. On September 6, 2007, she received the endorsement of Emily's List. Jennings lost to incumbent Vern Buchanan, taking just 37% of the vote.

=== Payroll tax controversy ===
In August 2007, while Jennings continued her court contest of the 2006 Congressional race results, the Herald-Tribune reported on a lawsuit filed by Democratic primary candidate Jan Schneider through the Federal Election Commission (FEC). The lawsuit alleged that Jennings collected but failed to file and submit payroll taxes collected from her campaign staff during the 2006 election. Initially the Jennings campaign admitted that they had failed to pay $23,835 in payroll taxes during the campaign as a consequence of a paperwork error that was cleared up as soon as it was found. Said Jennings, "when I found out about it, I corrected it".

However, the next day the Jennings campaign stated that the amount of unpaid payroll taxes was closer to $38,000, but IRS and campaign records indicated that the amount of repaid payroll taxes since July 2006 amounted to $70,126. The revelations followed a 2006 election where Jennings spoke at length about Buchanan's refusal to release his personal tax returns; upon the breaking of the controversy, Schneider referred to the news as a demonstration of "shameful hypocrisy" on the part of Jennings.

== See also ==
- United States House of Representatives elections in Florida, 2008
- Florida's 13th congressional district
