= 2008 United States House of Representatives elections in Florida =

- November 4, 2008

All 25 Florida seats to the United States House of Representatives
	Majority party	Minority party
Party	Republican	Democratic
Last election	16	9
Seats won	15	10
Seat change	▼1	▲1
Popular vote	3,993,663	3,812,163
Percentage	49.92%	47.65%
Swing	▼6.75%	▲6.11%

Republican
50–60%
60–70%
70–80%
Democratic
50–60%
60–70%
70–80%
80–90%
90>%

The 2008 United States House of Representatives Elections in Florida were held on November 4, 2008 to determine who would represent the state of Florida in the United States House of Representatives. Representatives are elected for two-year terms; those elected served in the 111th Congress from January 4, 2009 until January 3, 2011. The election coincided with the 2008 U.S. presidential election.

Florida had twenty-five seats in the House, apportioned according to the 2000 United States census. Its delegation to the 110th Congress of 2007-2009 consisted of sixteen Republicans and nine Democrats. In 2008, Districts 8 and 24 changed party from Republican to Democratic, and District 16 changed party from Democratic to Republican. Florida's delegation to the 111th Congress therefore consisted of fifteen Republicans and ten Democrats, a net increase of one Democrat. CQ Politics had forecasted districts 8, 13, 15, 16, 18, 21, 22, 24 and 25 to be at some risk for the incumbent party.

The Primary election was held August 26, 2008, with a registration deadline of July 28, 2008. The General election was held November 4, 2008, with a registration deadline of October 6, 2008. Early voting in Florida begins 15 days before an election and ends on the second day before an election. In 2008, early voting ran from October 20 through November 2.

== Overview ==
United States House of Representatives elections in Florida, 2008
Party	Votes	Percentage	Seats	+/–
Republican	3,993,663	49.92%	15	–1
Democratic	3,812,163	47.65%	10	+1
Others	194,174	2.43%	0	0
Valid votes	8,000,000	94.60%		
Invalid or blank votes	456,329	5.40%		
Totals	8,456,329	100.00%	25	—
Voter turnout	75.2%			

Popular vote
Republican	49.92%
Democratic	47.65%
Other	2.43%

House seats
Republican	60%
Democratic	40%

All of the vote totals were copied from the Secretary of State of Florida's Website

=== Match-up summary ===
District	Incumbent	2008 Status	Democratic	Republican	Other Party	Independent
1	Jeff Miller	Re-election	Jim Bryan	Jeff Miller		
2	Allen Boyd	Re-election	Allen Boyd	Mark Mulligan		
3	Corrine Brown	Re-election	Corrine Brown			
4	Ander Crenshaw	Re-election	Jay McGovern	Ander Crenshaw		
5	Ginny Brown-Waite	Re-election	John Russell	Ginny Brown-Waite		
6	Cliff Stearns	Re-election	Tim Cunha	Cliff Stearns		
7	John Mica	Re-election	Faye Armitage	John Mica		
8	Ric Keller	Re-election	Alan Grayson	Ric Keller		
9	Gus Michael Bilirakis	Re-election	Bill Mitchell	Gus Michael Bilirakis	Richard Emmons, Andrew Pasayan	John Kalimnios
10	Bill Young	Re-election	Bob Hackworth	Bill Young		
11	Kathy Castor	Re-election	Kathy Castor	Eddie Adams, Jr.		
12	Adam Putnam	Re-election	Doug Tudor	Adam Putnam		
13	Vern Buchanan	Re-election	Christine Jennings	Vern Buchanan		Jan Schneider
14	Connie Mack IV	Re-election	Robert Neeld	Connie Mack IV		
15	Dave Weldon	Open	Steve Blythe	Bill Posey	Jeffrey Bouffard	Frank Zilaitis, Trevor Lowing
16	Tim Mahoney	Re-election	Tim Mahoney	Tom Rooney		
17	Kendrick Meek	Re-election	Kendrick Meek			
18	Ileana Ros-Lehtinen	Re-election	Annette Taddeo	Ileana Ros-Lehtinen		
19	Robert Wexler	Re-election	Robert Wexler	Edward J. Lynch		
20	Debbie Wasserman Schultz	Re-election	Debbie Wasserman Schultz		Marc Luzietti	Margaret Hostetter
21	Lincoln Diaz-Balart	Re-election	Raul L. Martinez	Lincoln Diaz-Balart		
22	Ron Klein	Re-election	Ron Klein	Allen West (former U.S. military officer)		
23	Alcee Hastings	Re-election	Alcee Hastings	Marion Dennis Thorpe Jr.		
24	Tom Feeney	Re-election	Suzanne Kosmas	Tom Feeney		
25	Mario Diaz-Balart	Re-election	Joe Garcia	Mario Diaz-Balart		

== District 1 ==
2008 Florida's 1st congressional district election
- November 4, 2008
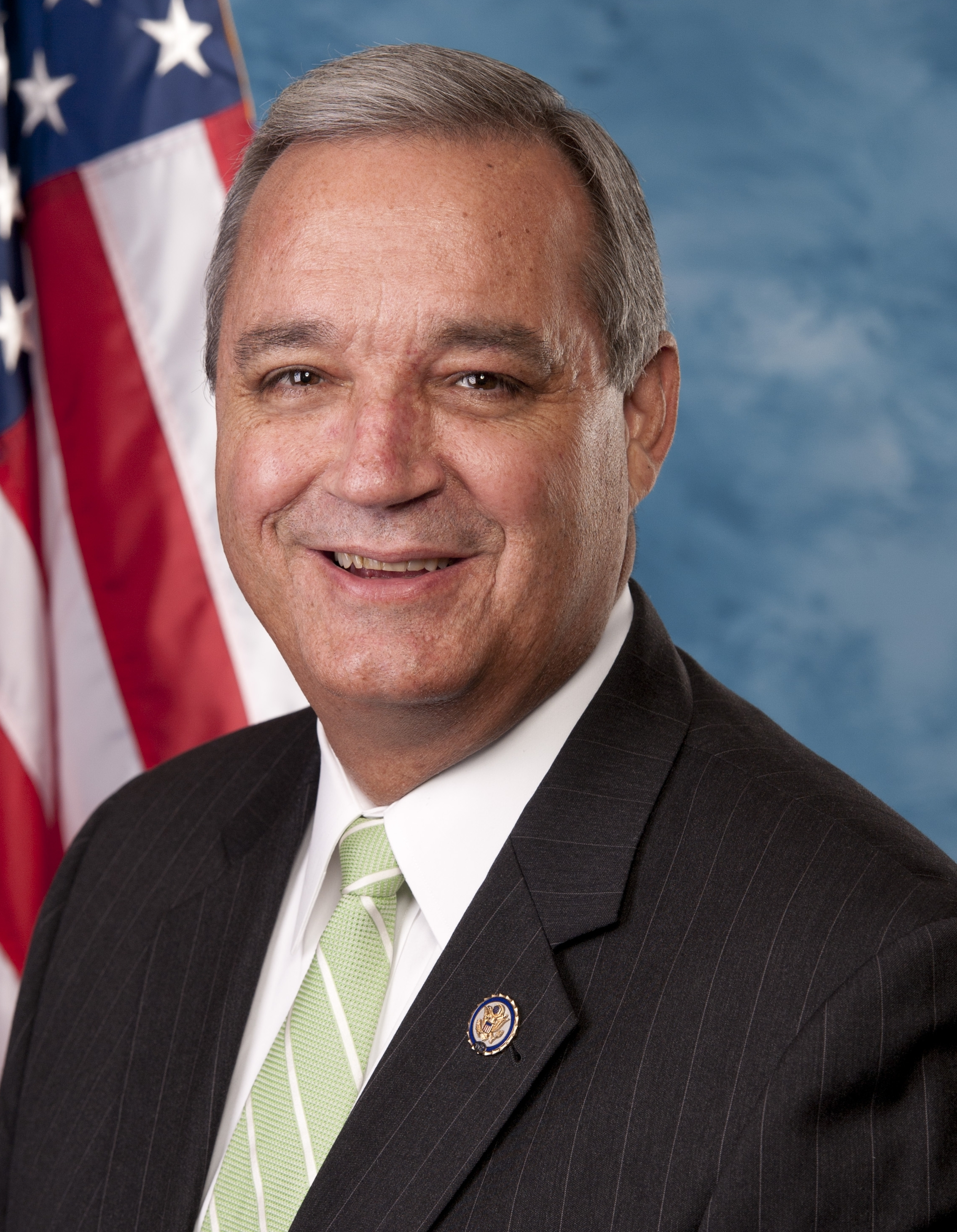

Nominee	Jeff Miller	Jim Bryan
Party	Republican	Democratic
Popular vote	232,559	98,797
Percentage	70.18%	29.82%
- County results Miller: 60–70% 70–80%
U.S. Representative before election
Jeff Miller
Republican
Elected U.S. Representative
Jeff Miller
Republican

Republican incumbent Jeff Miller has held this seat since winning a special election in 2001. He was challenged by Democrat Jim Bryan (campaign website), a Vietnam War veteran. CQ Politics forecasted the race as 'Safe Republican'.

- Race ranking and details from CQ Politics
- Campaign contributions from OpenSecrets

=== Predictions ===
Source	Ranking	As of
The Cook Political Report	Safe R	November 6, 2008
Rothenberg	Safe R	November 2, 2008
Sabato's Crystal Ball	Safe R	November 6, 2008
Real Clear Politics	Safe R	November 7, 2008
CQ Politics	Safe R	November 6, 2008

=== Results ===
Incumbent Jeff Miller retained his seat with about 70 percent of the vote.

Florida's 1st congressional district election, 2008
Party	Candidate	Votes	%
Republican	Jeff Miller (incumbent)	232,559	70.2
Democratic	Jim Bryan	98,797	29.8
Total votes		331,356	100.00
Republican hold			

== District 2 ==
2008 Florida's 2nd congressional district election
- November 4, 2008
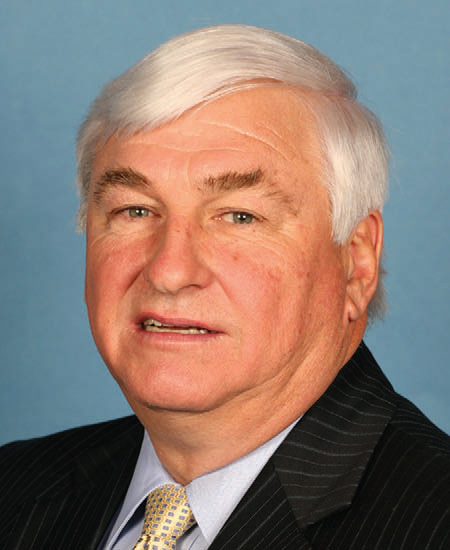

Nominee	Allen Boyd	Mark Mulligan
Party	Democratic	Republican
Popular vote	216,804	133,404
Percentage	61.88%	38.08%
- County results Boyd: 50–60% 60–70% 70–80% 80–90% Mulligan: 50–60% 60–70% 70–80%
U.S. Representative before election
Allen Boyd
Democratic
Elected U.S. Representative
Allen Boyd
Democratic

Democratic incumbent Allen Boyd has held this seat since 1997. Other contestants in this race included Republican challenger Mark Mulligan and write-in candidate Robert Ortiz. CQ Politics forecasted the race as 'Safe Democrat'.

- Race ranking and details from CQ Politics
- Campaign contributions from OpenSecrets

=== Predictions ===
Source	Ranking	As of
The Cook Political Report	Safe D	November 6, 2008
Rothenberg	Safe D	November 2, 2008
Sabato's Crystal Ball	Safe D	November 6, 2008
Real Clear Politics	Safe D	November 7, 2008
CQ Politics	Safe D	November 6, 2008

=== Results ===
Allen Boyd was reelected with slightly under 62 percent of the vote.

Florida's 2nd congressional district election, 2008
Party	Candidate	Votes	%
Democratic	Allen Boyd (incumbent)	216,804	61.9
Republican	Mark Mulligan	133,404	38.1
Independent	Robert Ortiz (write-in)	159	0.0
Total votes		350,367	100.00
Democratic hold			

== District 3 ==
2008 Florida's 3rd congressional district election
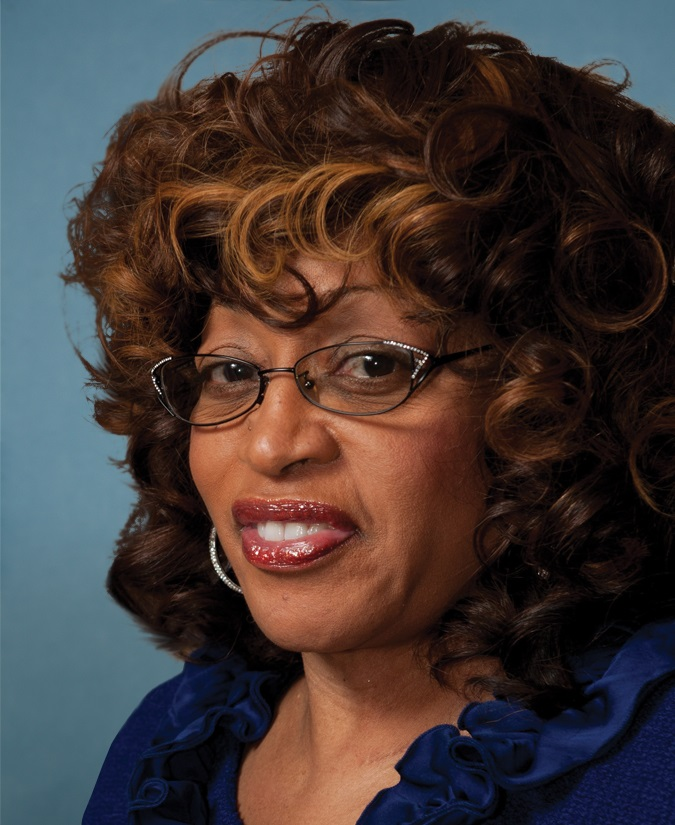
Nominee	Corrine Brown
Party	Democratic
Popular vote	Unopposed
Percentage	N/A
U.S. Representative before election
Corrine Brown
Democratic
Elected U.S. Representative
Corrine Brown
Democratic

Democratic incumbent Corrine Brown has held this seat since 1993 and ran unopposed in this election.

- Race ranking and details from CQ Politics
- Campaign contributions from OpenSecrets

=== Predictions ===
Source	Ranking	As of
The Cook Political Report	Safe D	November 6, 2008
Rothenberg	Safe D	November 2, 2008
Sabato's Crystal Ball	Safe D	November 6, 2008
Real Clear Politics	Safe D	November 7, 2008
CQ Politics	Safe D	November 6, 2008

== District 4 ==
2008 Florida's 4th congressional district election
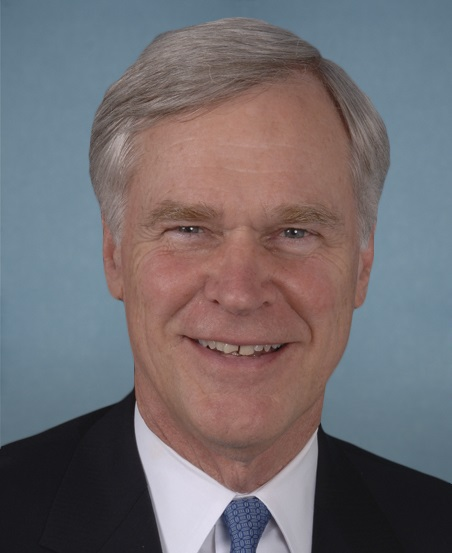

Nominee	Ander Crenshaw	Jay McGovern
Party	Republican	Democratic
Popular vote	224,112	119,330
Percentage	65.3%	34.7%
- County results Crenshaw: 50–60% 60–70% 70–80% Mcgovern: 50–60%
U.S. Representative before election
Ander Crenshaw
Republican
Elected U.S. Representative
Ander Crenshaw
Republican

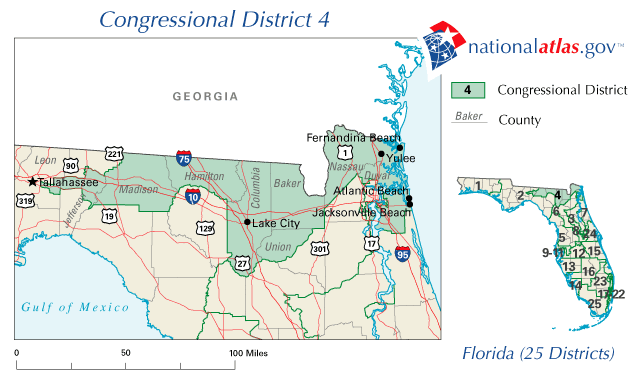

Republican incumbent Ander Crenshaw has held this seat since 2001. He was challenged by Democrat Jay McGovern, an Iraq War veteran. CQ Politics forecasts the race as 'Safe Republican'.

- Race ranking and details from CQ Politics
- Campaign contributions from OpenSecrets

=== Predictions ===
Source	Ranking	As of
The Cook Political Report	Safe R	November 6, 2008
Rothenberg	Safe R	November 2, 2008
Sabato's Crystal Ball	Safe R	November 6, 2008
Real Clear Politics	Safe R	November 7, 2008
CQ Politics	Safe R	November 6, 2008

=== Results ===
Republican Ander Crenshaw was reelected with around 65 percent of the votes.

Florida's 4th congressional district election, 2008
Party	Candidate	Votes	%
Republican	Ander Crenshaw (incumbent)	224,112	65.3
Democratic	Jay McGovern	119,330	34.7
Total votes		343,442	100.00
Republican hold			

== District 5 ==
2008 Florida's 5th congressional district election
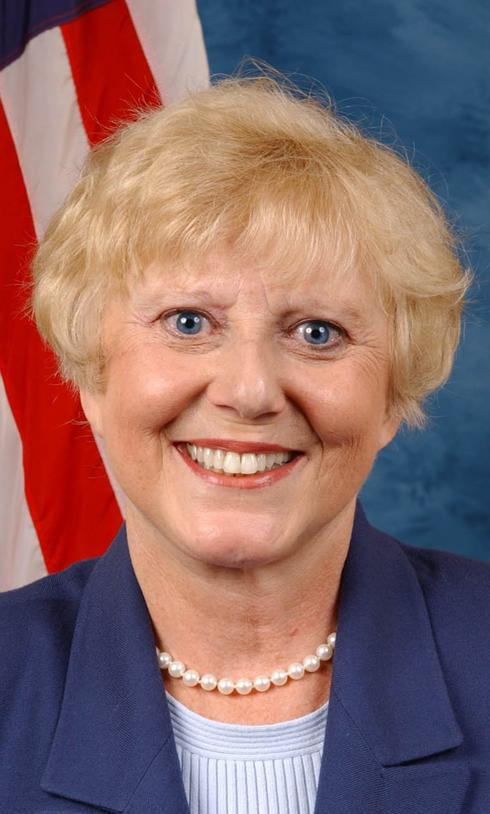

Nominee	Ginny Brown-Waite	John Russell
Party	Republican	Democratic
Popular vote	265,186	168,446
Percentage	61.2%	38.8%
- County results Brown-waite: 50–60% 60–70%
U.S. Representative before election
Ginny Brown-Waite
Republican
Elected U.S. Representative
Ginny Brown-Waite
Republican

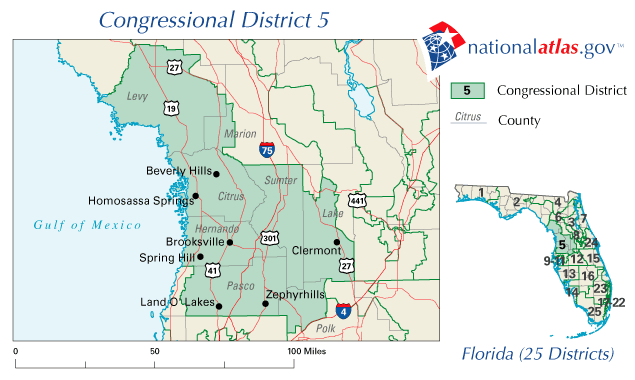

Republican incumbent Ginny Brown-Waite (campaign website), who has held this seat since 2003, was again challenged by Democrat John Russell (campaign website), who received 40% against Brown-Waite in the 2006 election. CQ Politics forecasted the race as 'Safe Republican'. (CPVI=R+5)

Brown-Waite attracted a serious primary challenger in this sprawling Nature Coast district. As of November, Jim King had already begun a media campaign attacking Brown-Waite from the right and appealing to the conservative Christians who exert a serious influence in the local Republican Party. While King was a longshot to unseat Brown-Waite, a lengthy and divisive primary campaign of this sort risks draining the incumbent's campaign resources, splintering her support, and causing her to take up more conservative stances that would appeal less to moderate voters in the general election.

Russell is a businessman, acute care nurse practitioner and local activist. He hoped to capitalize on Brown-Waite's difficult primary, her modest fundraising, and the recent demographic changes in this high-growth area.

- Race ranking and details from CQ Politics
- Campaign contributions from OpenSecrets

=== Predictions ===
Source	Ranking	As of
The Cook Political Report	Safe R	November 6, 2008
Rothenberg	Safe R	November 2, 2008
Sabato's Crystal Ball	Safe R	November 6, 2008
Real Clear Politics	Safe R	November 7, 2008
CQ Politics	Safe R	November 6, 2008

=== Results ===
Ginny Brown-Waite retained her seat. She received around 61 percent of the vote, improving her showing against Russell in the 2006 election by slightly over 1 percentage point.

Florida's 5th congressional district election, 2008
Party	Candidate	Votes	%
Republican	Ginny Brown-Waite (incumbent)	265,186	61.2
Democratic	John Russell	168,446	38.8
Total votes		433,632	100.00
Republican hold			

== District 6 ==
2008 Florida's 6th congressional district election
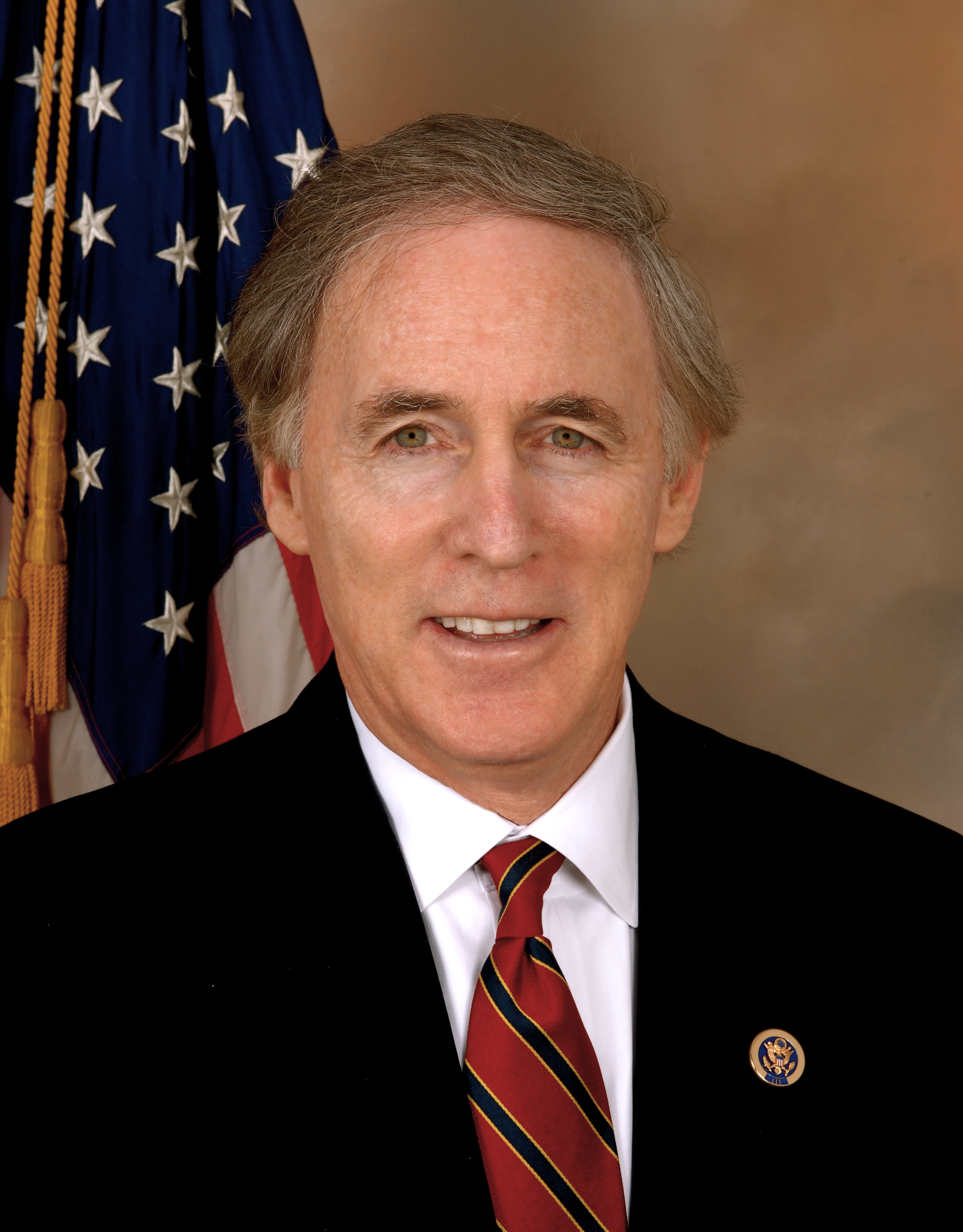

Nominee	Cliff Stearns	Tim Cunha
Party	Republican	Democratic
Popular vote	228,302	146,655
Percentage	60.9%	39.1%
- County results Stearns: 50–60% 60–70% 70–80% Cunha: 50–60%
U.S. Representative before election
Cliff Stearns
Republican
Elected U.S. Representative
Cliff Stearns
Republican

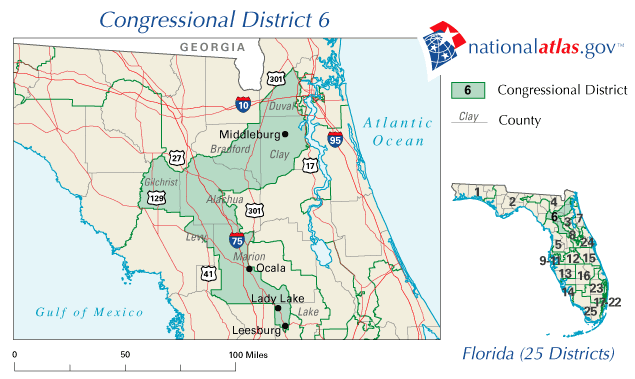

Republican incumbent Cliff Stearns has held this seat since 1989. He faced Democratic challenger Tim Cunha (campaign website). CQ Politics forecasts the race as 'Safe Republican'.

- Race ranking and details from CQ Politics
- Campaign contributions from OpenSecrets

=== Predictions ===
Source	Ranking	As of
The Cook Political Report	Safe R	November 6, 2008
Rothenberg	Safe R	November 2, 2008
Sabato's Crystal Ball	Safe R	November 6, 2008
Real Clear Politics	Safe R	November 7, 2008
CQ Politics	Safe R	November 6, 2008

=== Results ===
Incumbent Cliff Stearns was reelected with just under 61 percent of the votes.

Florida's 6th congressional district election, 2008
Party	Candidate	Votes	%
Republican	Cliff Stearns (incumbent)	228,302	60.9
Democratic	Tim Cunha	146,655	39.1
Total votes		374,957	100.00
Republican hold			

== District 7 ==
2008 Florida's 7th congressional district election
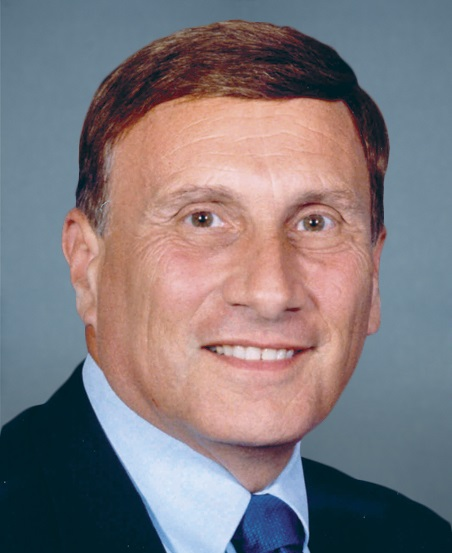
Nominee	John Mica	Faye Armitage
Party	Republican	Democratic
Popular vote	238,721	146,292
Percentage	62.0%	38.0%
- County results Mica: 50–60% 60–70% 70–80%
U.S. Representative before election
John Mica
Republican
Elected U.S. Representative
John Mica
Republican

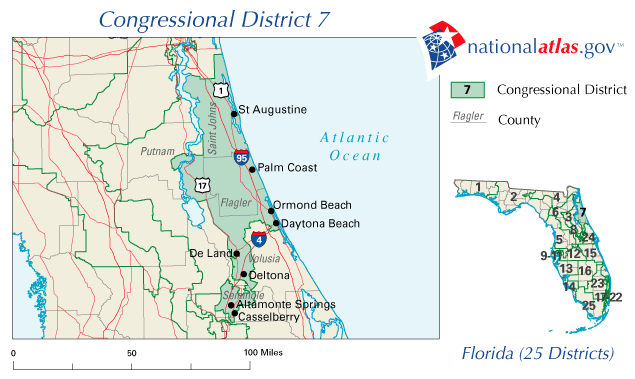

Republican incumbent John Mica, representing the district since 1993, faced Democratic challenger, Faye Armitage (campaign website). CQ Politics forecasted the race as 'Safe Republican'.

- Race ranking and details from CQ Politics
- Campaign contributions from OpenSecrets

=== Predictions ===
Source	Ranking	As of
The Cook Political Report	Safe R	November 6, 2008
Rothenberg	Safe R	November 2, 2008
Sabato's Crystal Ball	Safe R	November 6, 2008
Real Clear Politics	Safe R	November 7, 2008
CQ Politics	Safe R	November 6, 2008

=== Results ===
Incumbent John Mica held his seat, gaining 62 percent of the votes.

Florida's 7th congressional district election, 2008
Party	Candidate	Votes	%
Republican	John Mica (incumbent)	238,721	62.0
Democratic	Faye Armitage	146,292	38.0
Total votes		385,013	100.00
Republican hold			

== District 8 ==
2008 Florida's 8th congressional district election
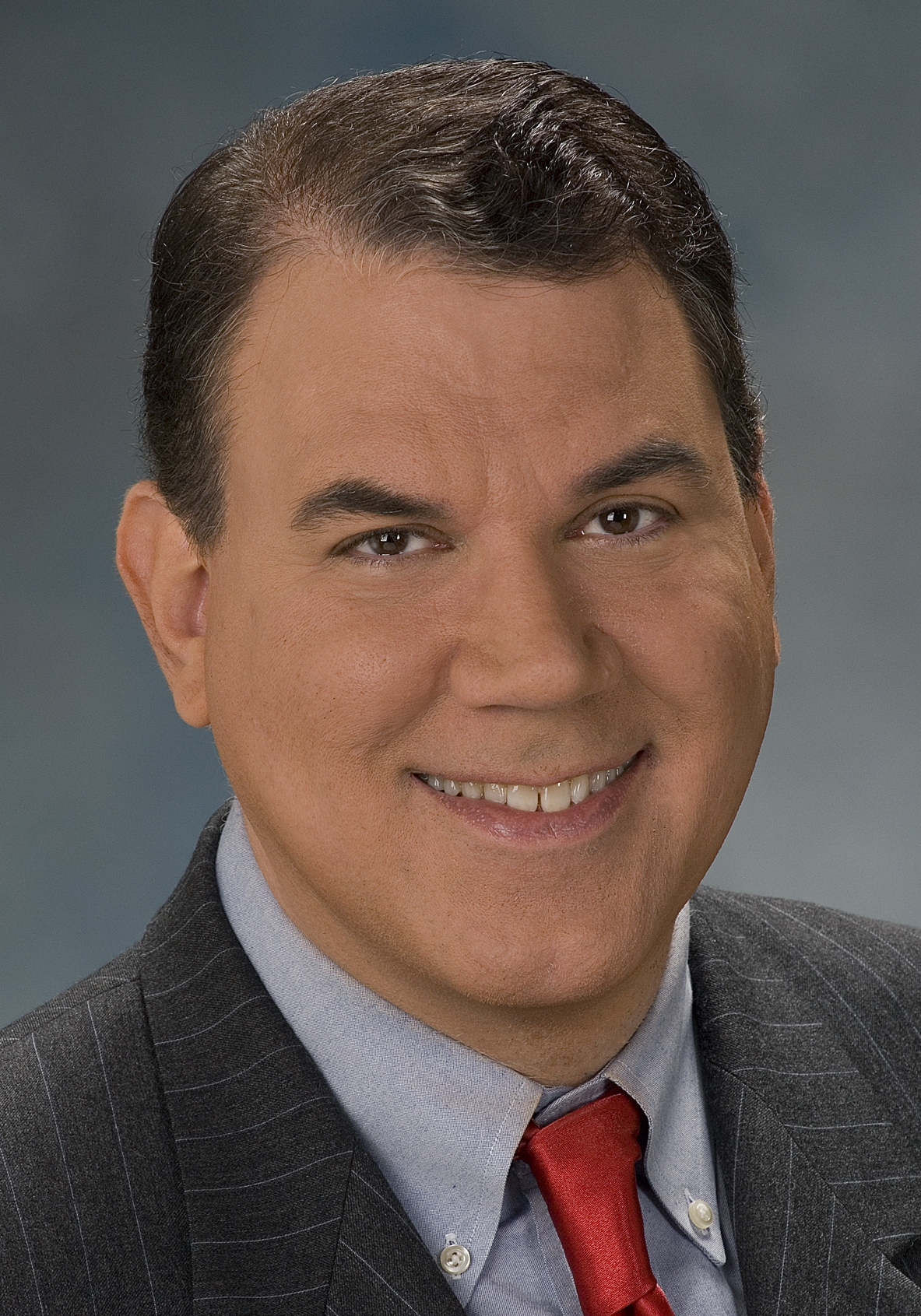

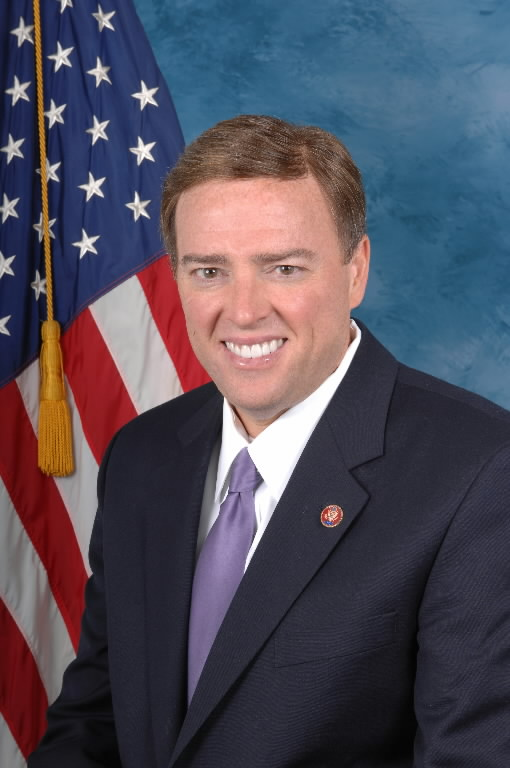
Nominee	Alan Grayson	Ric Keller
Party	Democratic	Republican
Popular vote	172,854	159,490
Percentage	52.0%	48.0%
- County results Grayson: 50–60% Keller: 50–60% 60–70%
U.S. Representative before election
Ric Keller
Republican
Elected U.S. Representative
Alan Grayson
Democratic

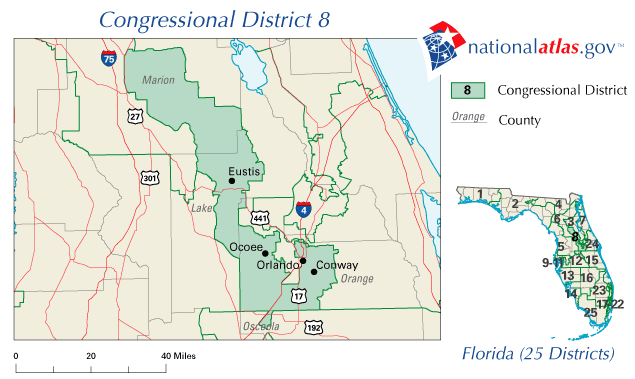

Democratic nominee Alan Grayson challenged Republican incumbent Ric Keller, who had held the seat since 2001. On October 21, 2008, CQ Politics switched its outlook on the race from "No Clear Favorite" to "Leans Democratic," citing the fact that there are now more registered Democrats that Republicans in Keller's district. George W. Bush had won the district in 2004 with 55% of the vote (CPVI=R+3).

In 2006, Keller, author of the "Cheeseburger Bill", was reelected by less than expected to Orlando businessman Charlie Stuart, who polled 46%. After the November 2006 election, Keller announced that he would break his 2000 pledge to serve only four terms. Todd Long, an Orlando attorney and radio talk show host, then announced he would challenge Keller in the Republican primary, promising to make an issue of the broken term-limits pledge. Greg Lewis and retired Marine Corps officer Bob Hering also announced they would challenge Keller in the primary, but they did not meet the qualifying requirements. The Keller-Long primary fight intensified over the summer, with Keller's term limit retraction, as well as his vote against The Surge making him increasingly vulnerable to defeat. However, just days before the August 26 primary, Keller sent out a mailer exposing Long's arrest record, a DUI, and another trespass warning. Keller squeaked by with a 53%-47% win in the GOP primary, but his reputation took a hit, as many saw the mailer as a political "dirty trick."

Grayson, an attorney who prosecutes war profiteers, had run unsuccessfully in the 2006 Democratic primary. In the 2008 primary, he faced large field, including Charlie Stuart, who had lost to Keller by six percentage points in 2006; Mike Smith, a former state prosecutor and current trial lawyer with Morgan & Morgan; Corbett Kroeler, an environmental activist; Quoc Ba Van, local weight-lifting champion and recent Emory Law School graduate.

- Race ranking and details from CQ Politics
- Campaign contributions from OpenSecrets

=== Predictions ===
Source	Ranking	As of
The Cook Political Report	Tossup	November 6, 2008
Rothenberg	Lean D (flip)	November 2, 2008
Sabato's Crystal Ball	Lean D (flip)	November 6, 2008
Real Clear Politics	Tossup	November 7, 2008
CQ Politics	Lean D (flip)	November 6, 2008

=== Results ===
Alan Grayson defeated incumbent Ric Keller, receiving 52 percent of the vote. This was one of two pickups for the Democratic Party in Florida, along with District 24. The general election was heated, with "mudslinging" and attack ads by both sides on television and in mailers. The race gained considerable national attention.

Florida's 8th congressional district election, 2008
Party	Candidate	Votes	%
Democratic	Alan Grayson	172,854	52.0
Republican	Ric Keller (incumbent)	159,490	48.0
Total votes		332,244	100.00
Democratic gain from Republican			

== District 9 ==
2008 Florida's 9th congressional district election
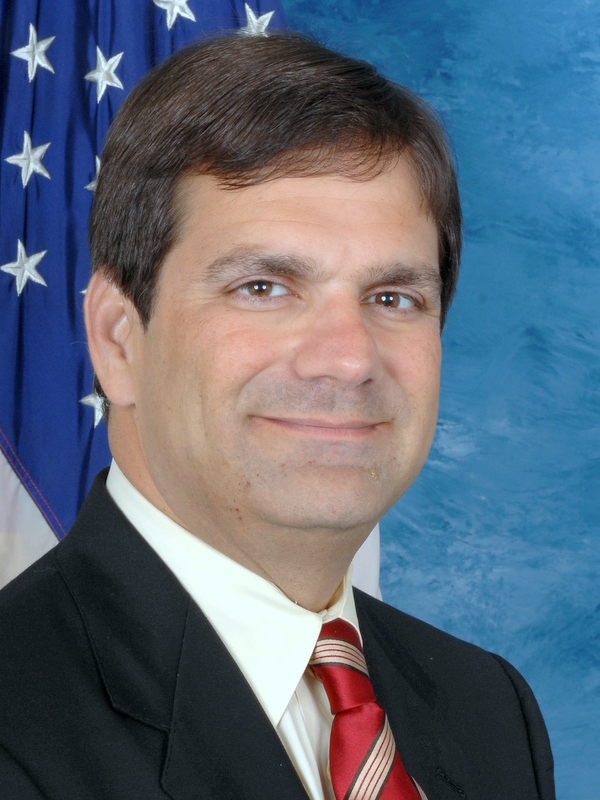

Nominee	Gus Michael Bilirakis	Bill Mitchell
Party	Republican	Democratic
Popular vote	216,591	126,346
Percentage	62.2%	36.3%
- County results Bilirakis: 60–70%
U.S. Representative before election
Gus Michael Bilirakis
Republican
Elected U.S. Representative
Gus Michael Bilirakis
Republican

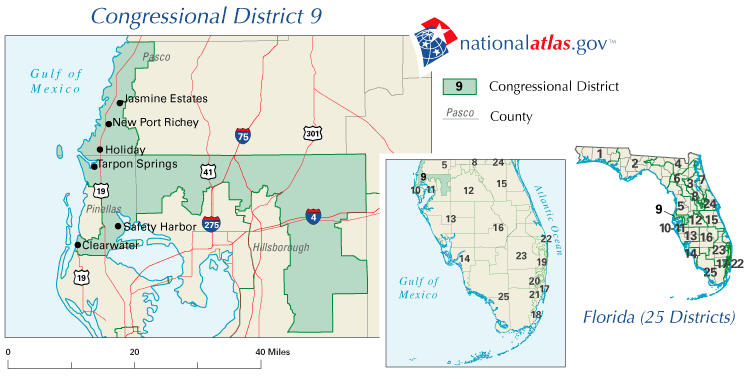

Republican freshman incumbent Gus Michael Bilirakis faced several opponents in this race. Challengers included Democrat Bill Mitchell, independents Richard Emmons and John Kalimnios, and write-in candidate Andrew Pasayan. CQ Politics forecasted the race as 'Safe Republican'.

- Race ranking and details from CQ Politics
- Campaign contributions from OpenSecrets

=== Predictions ===
Source	Ranking	As of
The Cook Political Report	Safe R	November 6, 2008
Rothenberg	Safe R	November 2, 2008
Sabato's Crystal Ball	Safe R	November 6, 2008
Real Clear Politics	Safe R	November 7, 2008
CQ Politics	Safe R	November 6, 2008

=== Results ===
Incumbent Gus Michael Bilirakis retained his seat, receiving around 62 percent of the votes.

Florida's 9th congressional district election, 2008
Party	Candidate	Votes	%
Republican	Gus Michael Bilirakis (incumbent)	216,591	62.2
Democratic	Bill Mitchell	126,346	36.3
Independent	John Kalimnios	3,394	1.0
Independent	Richard Emmons	2,042	0.6
Independent	Andrew Pasayan (write-in)	5	0.0
Total votes		348,378	100.00
Republican hold			

== District 10 ==
2008 Florida's 10th congressional district election
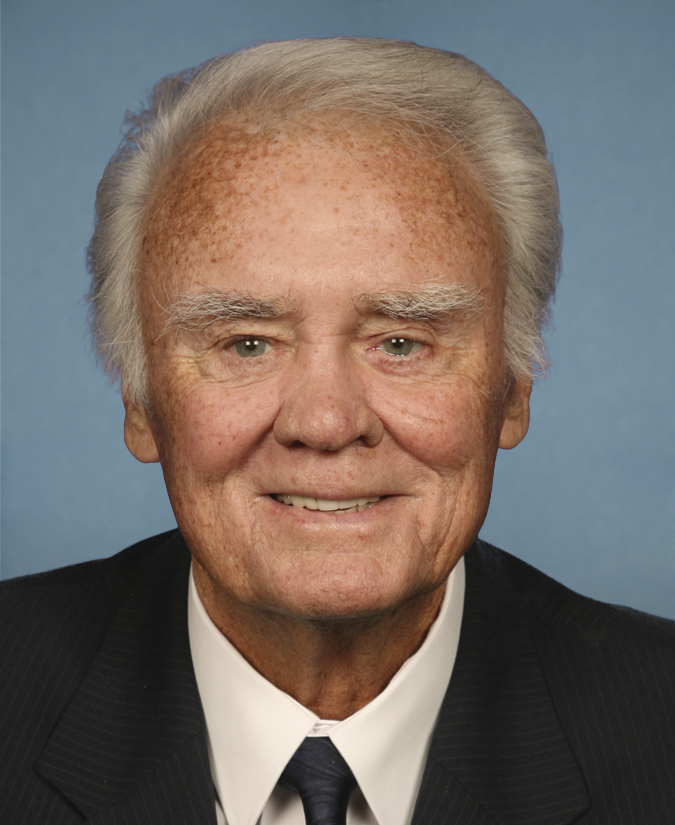

Nominee	Bill Young	Bob Hackworth
Party	Republican	Democratic
Popular vote	182,781	118,430
Percentage	60.7%	39.3%
- County results Young: 60–70%
U.S. Representative before election
Bill Young
Republican
Elected U.S. Representative
Bill Young
Republican

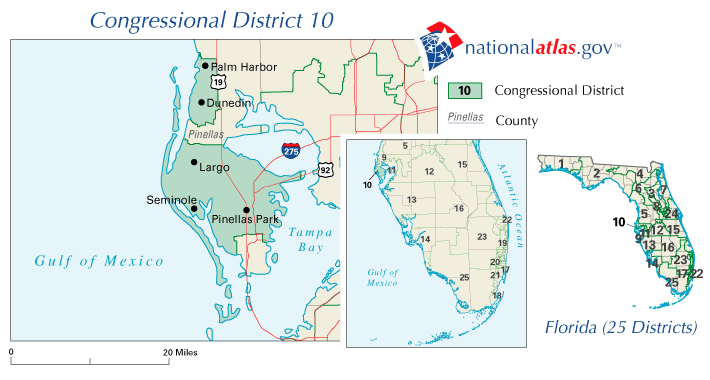

Republican incumbent Bill Young, who has represented this district since 1971 and is currently the longest-serving Republican in the House, faced Dunedin Mayor Democrat Bob Hackworth and write in candidate Don Callahan. Bob Hackworth won the Democratic primary on August 26, 2008 with 46% of the vote, defeating Samm Simpson and Max Linn. CQ Politics forecasted the race as 'Safe Republican'.

- Race ranking and details from CQ Politics
- Campaign contributions from OpenSecrets

=== Predictions ===
Source	Ranking	As of
The Cook Political Report	Safe R	November 6, 2008
Rothenberg	Safe R	November 2, 2008
Sabato's Crystal Ball	Safe R	November 6, 2008
Real Clear Politics	Safe R	November 7, 2008
CQ Politics	Safe R	November 6, 2008

=== Results ===
Bill Young was reelected, receiving around 61 percent of the votes.

Florida's 10th congressional district election, 2008
Party	Candidate	Votes	%
Republican	Bill Young (incumbent)	182,781	60.7
Democratic	Bob Hackworth	118,430	39.3
Independent	Don Callahan (write-in)	9	0.0
Total votes		301,220	100.00
Republican hold			

== District 11 ==
2008 Florida's 11th congressional district election
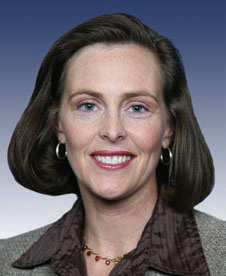

Nominee	Kathy Castor	Eddie Adams, Jr.
Party	Democratic	Republican
Popular vote	184,106	72,825
Percentage	71.7%	28.3%
- County results Castor: 60–70% 80–90%
U.S. Representative before election
Kathy Castor
Democratic
Elected U.S. Representative
Kathy Castor
Democratic

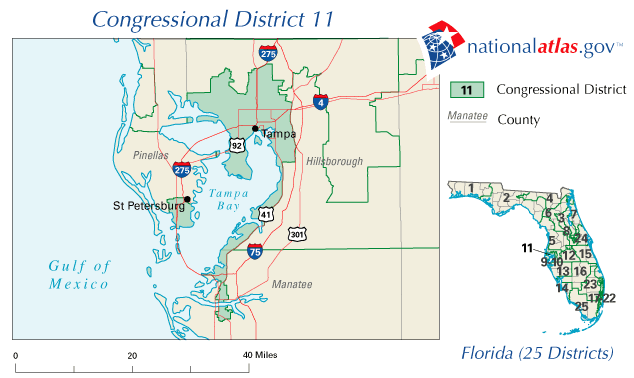

Freshman Democratic congresswoman Kathy Castor faced Republican challenger Eddie Adams, Jr. CQ Politics forecasted the race as 'Safe Democrat'.

- Race ranking and details from CQ Politics
- Campaign contributions from OpenSecrets

=== Predictions ===
Source	Ranking	As of
The Cook Political Report	Safe D	November 6, 2008
Rothenberg	Safe D	November 2, 2008
Sabato's Crystal Ball	Safe D	November 6, 2008
Real Clear Politics	Safe D	November 7, 2008
CQ Politics	Safe D	November 6, 2008

=== Results ===
Kathy Castor easily retained her seat with nearly 72 percent of the votes.

Florida's 11th congressional district election, 2008
Party	Candidate	Votes	%
Democratic	Kathy Castor (incumbent)	184,106	71.7
Republican	Eddie Adams, Jr.	72,825	28.3
Total votes		256,931	100.00
Democratic hold			

== District 12 ==
2008 Florida's 12th congressional district election
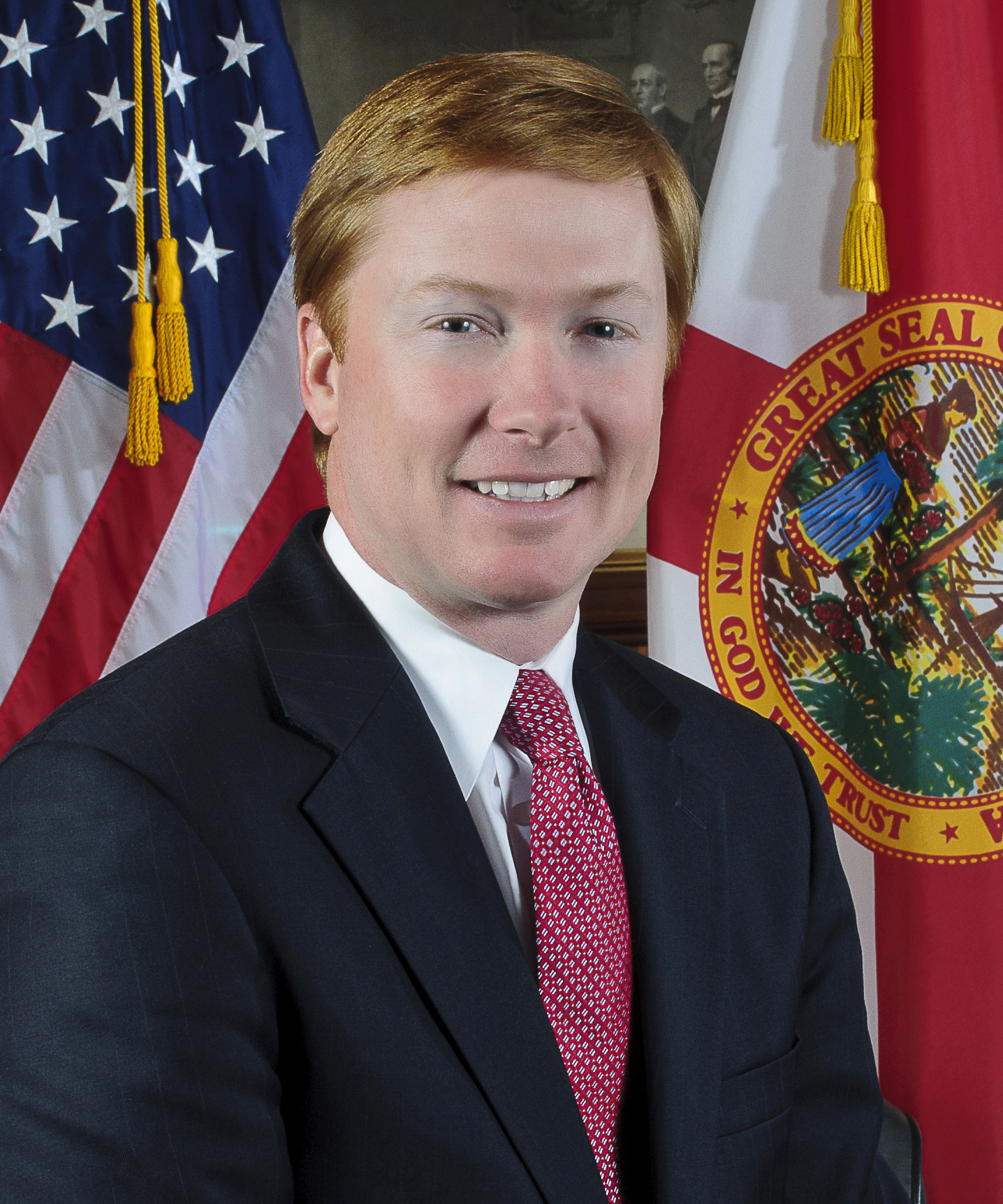

Nominee	Adam Putnam	Doug Tudor
Party	Republican	Democratic
Popular vote	185,698	137,465
Percentage	57.5%	42.5%
- County results Putnam: 50–60% 60–70% Tudor: 70–80%
U.S. Representative before election
Adam Putnam
Republican
Elected U.S. Representative
Adam Putnam
Republican

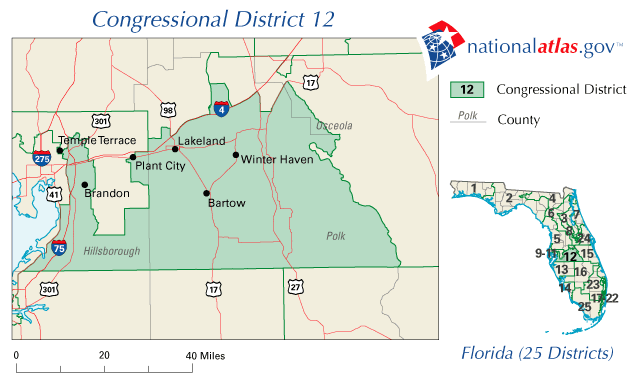

Republican incumbent Adam Putnam, who has held this seat since 2001, was challenged by Democrat and retired U.S. Navy Master Chief Petty Officer Doug Tudor. CQ Politics forecasted the race as 'Safe Republican'.

- Race ranking and details from CQ Politics
- Campaign contributions from OpenSecrets

=== Predictions ===
Source	Ranking	As of
The Cook Political Report	Safe R	November 6, 2008
Rothenberg	Safe R	November 2, 2008
Sabato's Crystal Ball	Safe R	November 6, 2008
Real Clear Politics	Safe R	November 7, 2008
CQ Politics	Safe R	November 6, 2008

=== Results ===
Adam Putnam was reelected, receiving 57.5 percent of the vote.

Florida's 12th congressional district election, 2008
Party	Candidate	Votes	%
Republican	Adam Putnam (incumbent)	185,698	57.5
Democratic	Doug Tudor	137,465	42.5
Total votes		323,163	100.00
Republican hold			

== District 13 ==
2008 Florida's 13th congressional district election
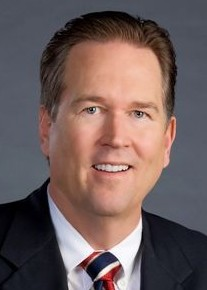

Nominee	Vern Buchanan	Christine Jennings	Jan Schneider
Party	Republican	Democratic	Independent
Popular vote	204,382	137,967	20,289
Percentage	55.5%	37.5%	5.5%
- County results Buchanan: 50–60% 60–70%
U.S. Representative before election
Vern Buchanan
Republican
Elected U.S. Representative
Vern Buchanan
Republican

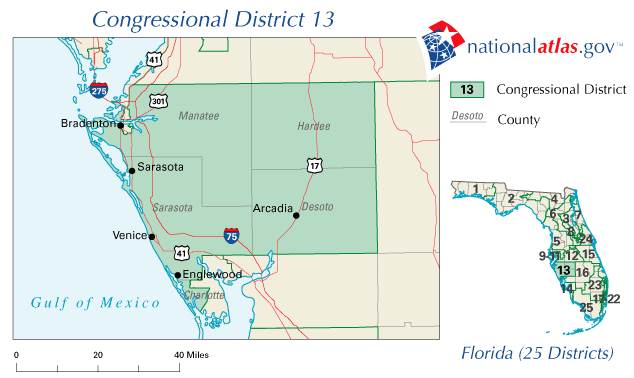

Freshman Republican incumbent Vern Buchanan (campaign website) was again challenged by Democratic banker Christine Jennings (campaign website). Former Democratic Congressional candidate Jan Schneider also filed, running as an Independent. This was expected to be a competitive race in 2008, though Buchanan was far ahead of Jennings in fundraising. CQ Politics forecasted the race as 'Leans Republican'. George W. Bush won 56% of the district's vote in 2004 (CPVI=R+4).

Buchanan was certified as having won in 2006 by a 369-vote margin over Jennings, but Jennings challenged the election in court. Although Buchanan was seated by the House, the House has made no final decision on the matter. In mid-July 2007, Jennings announced she would run again in 2008.

- Race ranking and details from CQ Politics
- Campaign contributions from OpenSecrets
- Buchanan (R-i) vs Jennings (D) polls from Pollster.com

=== Predictions ===
Source	Ranking	As of
The Cook Political Report	Likely R	November 6, 2008
Rothenberg	Likely R	November 2, 2008
Sabato's Crystal Ball	Lean R	November 6, 2008
Real Clear Politics	Safe R	November 7, 2008
CQ Politics	Lean R	November 6, 2008

=== Results ===
Vern Buchanan was reelected to a second term. In contrast to the 2006 election, Buchanan won by a convincing margin, receiving 55.5 percent of the vote.

Florida's 13th congressional district election, 2008
Party	Candidate	Votes	%
Republican	Vern Buchanan (incumbent)	204,382	55.5
Democratic	Christine Jennings	137,967	37.5
Independent	Jan Schneider	20,289	5.5
Independent	Don Baldauf	5,358	1.5
Total votes		367,996	100.00
Republican hold			

== District 14 ==
2008 Florida's 14th congressional district election
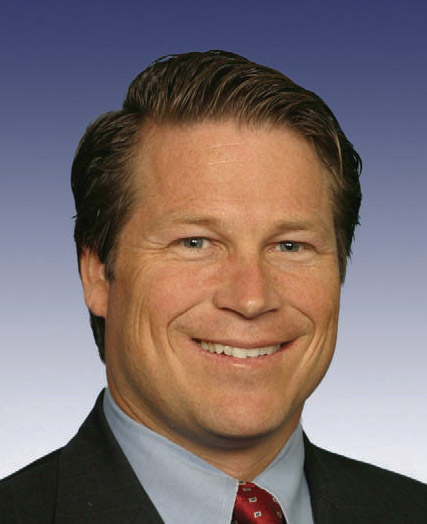

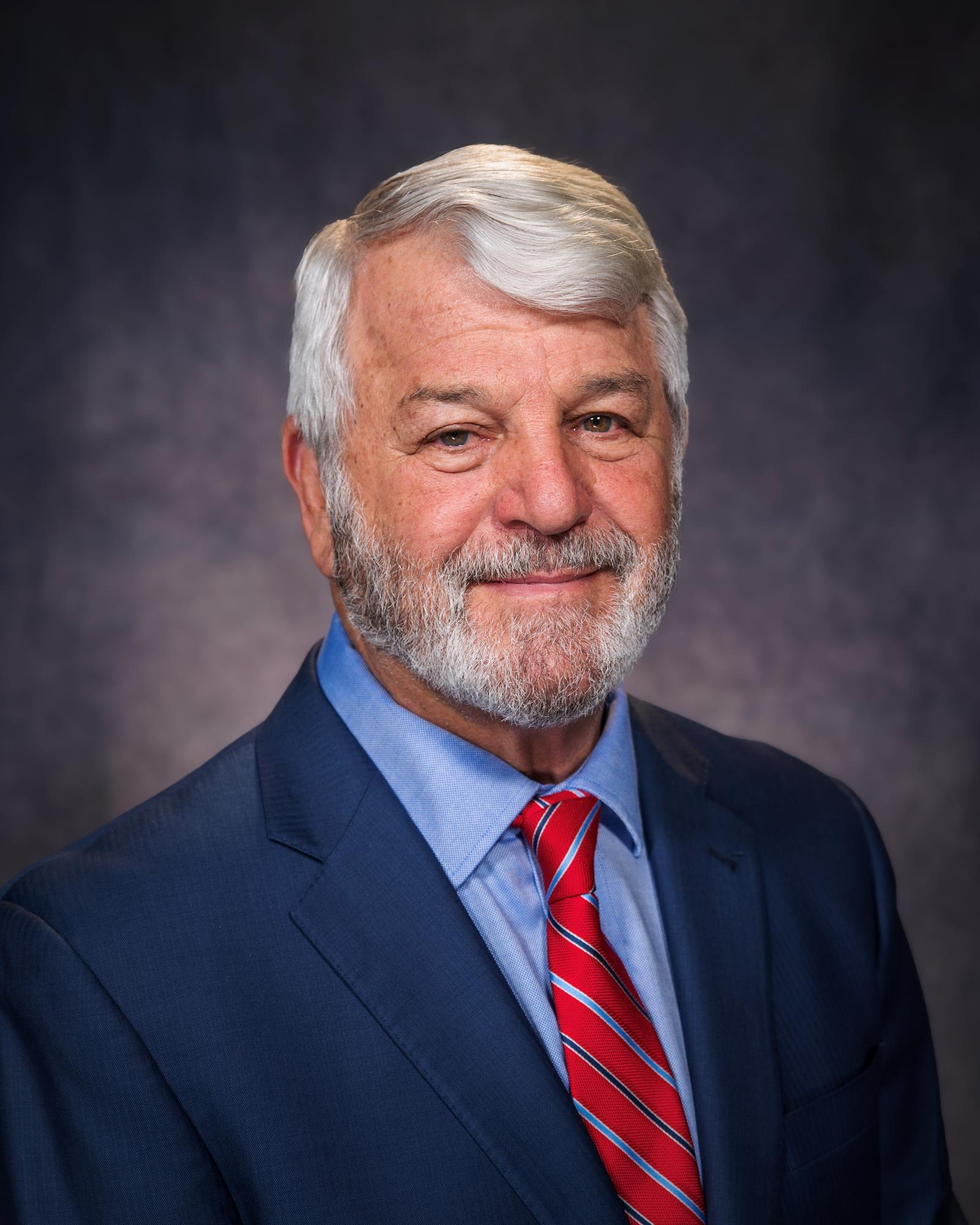
Nominee	Connie Mack	Robert Neeld	Burt Saunders
Party	Republican	Democratic	Independent
Popular vote	224,602	93,590	54,750
Percentage	59.4%	24.8%	14.5%
- County results Mack: 50–60% 60–70%
U.S. Representative before election
Connie Mack
Republican
Elected U.S. Representative
Connie Mack
Republican

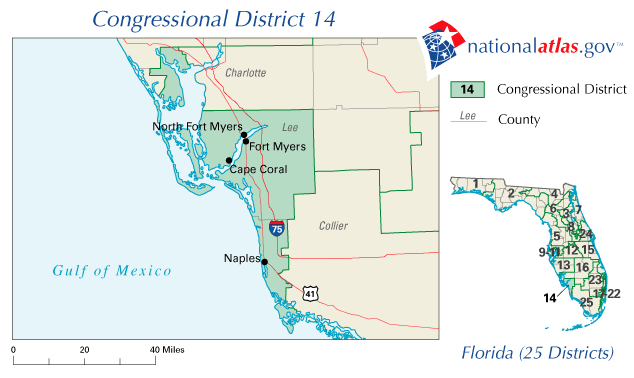

Republican incumbent Connie Mack, holder of this seat since 2005, was challenged by Democrat Robert Neeld (campaign website), Independent Jeff George (campaign website) and Republican State Senator Burt Saunders (who ran as an Independent). CQ Politics forecasted the race as 'Safe Republican'.

- Race ranking and details from CQ Politics
- Campaign contributions from OpenSecrets

=== Predictions ===
Source	Ranking	As of
The Cook Political Report	Safe R	November 6, 2008
Rothenberg	Safe R	November 2, 2008
Sabato's Crystal Ball	Safe R	November 6, 2008
Real Clear Politics	Safe R	November 7, 2008
CQ Politics	Safe R	November 6, 2008

=== Results ===
Connie Mack was returned to Congress for a third term, receiving over 59 percent of the votes.

Florida's 14th congressional district election, 2008
Party	Candidate	Votes	%
Republican	Connie Mack (incumbent)	224,602	59.4
Democratic	Robert Neeld	93,590	24.8
Independent	Burt Saunders	54,750	14.5
Independent	Jeff George	4,949	1.3
Total votes		377,891	100.00
Republican hold			

== District 15 ==
2008 Florida's 15th congressional district election
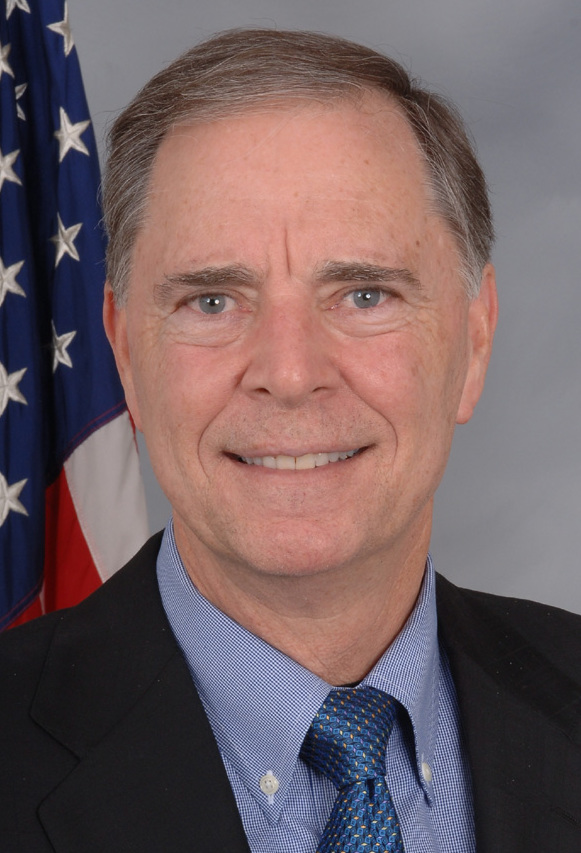

Nominee	Bill Posey	Steve Blythe
Party	Republican	Democratic
Popular vote	192,151	151,951
Percentage	53.1%	42.0%
- County results Posey: 50–60% 60–70% Blythe: 40–50% 50–60%
U.S. Representative before election
Dave Weldon
Republican
Elected U.S. Representative
Bill Posey
Republican

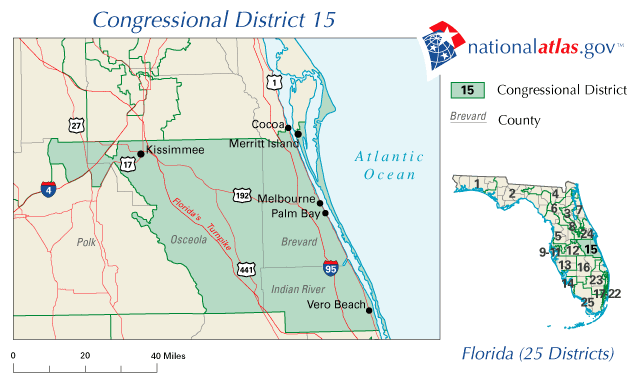

Seven-term Republican incumbent Dave Weldon had easily won re-election contests for a decade, but is retiring in 2008, leaving this Florida's only open House seat. Republican nominee State Senator Bill Posey, who was endorsed by Weldon and the Florida Republican Party, faced Democratic nominee physician Steve Blythe (campaign website). Independent candidates Frank Zilaitis and Trevor Lowing also ran for the seat. Libertarian Jeffrey Bouffard, a computer engineer and army veteran, also filed to run, but did not qualify for the ballot. CQ Politics forecasted the race as 'Republican Favored'. George W. Bush won 57% of the vote here in 2004 (CPVI=R+4).

- Race ranking and details from CQ Politics
- Campaign contributions from OpenSecrets

=== Predictions ===
Source	Ranking	As of
The Cook Political Report	Safe R	November 6, 2008
Rothenberg	Safe R	November 2, 2008
Sabato's Crystal Ball	Safe R	November 6, 2008
Real Clear Politics	Safe R	November 7, 2008
CQ Politics	Likely R	November 6, 2008

=== Results ===
Bill Posey won the open seat with 53 percent of the vote. As a result, this seat remained under Republican control for the 111th Congress.

Florida's 15th congressional district election, 2008
Party	Candidate	Votes	%
Republican	Bill Posey	192,151	53.1
Democratic	Steve Blythe	151,951	42.0
Independent	Frank Zilaitis	14,274	3.9
Independent	Trevor Lowing	3,495	1.0
Total votes		361,871	100.00
Republican hold			

== District 16 ==
2008 Florida's 16th congressional district election
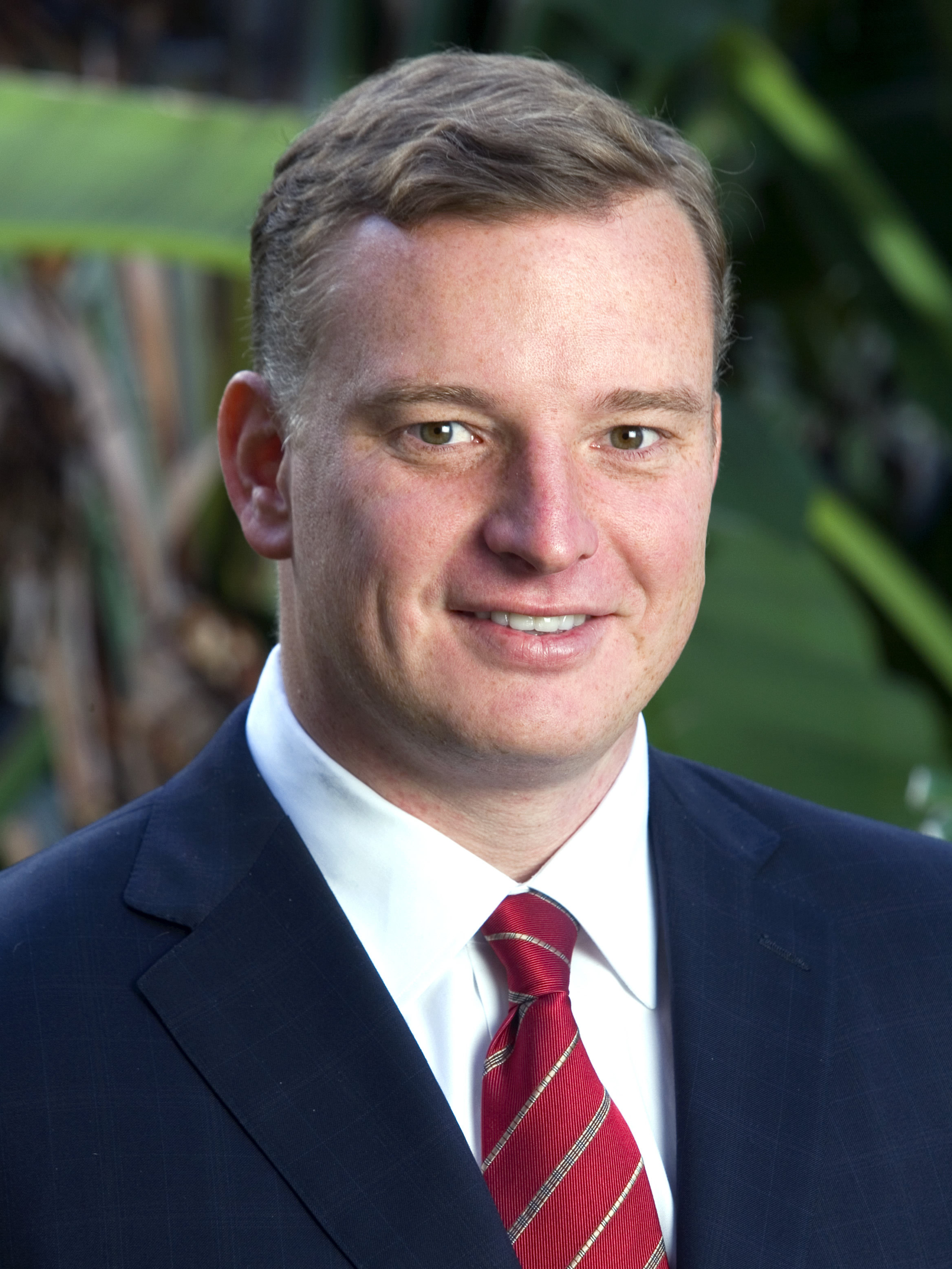

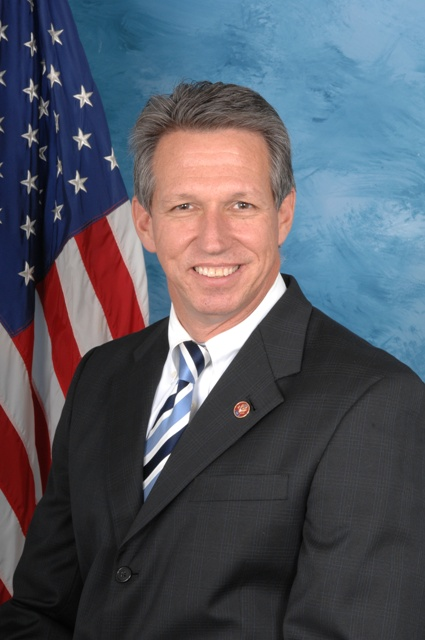
Nominee	Tom Rooney	Tim Mahoney
Party	Republican	Democratic
Popular vote	209,874	139,373
Percentage	60.1%	39.9%
- County results Rooney: 50–60% 60–70%
U.S. Representative before election
Tim Mahoney
Democratic
Elected U.S. Representative
Tom Rooney
Republican

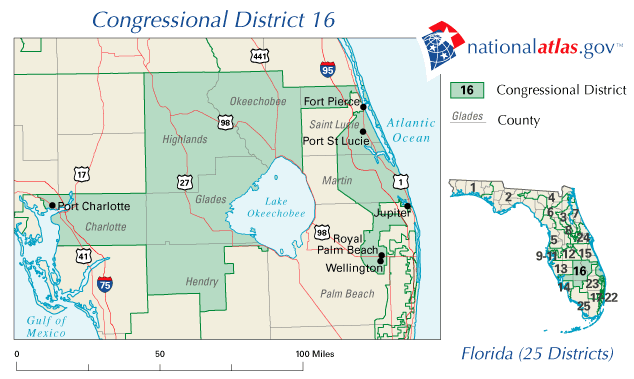

Republican nominee Tom Rooney faced Democratic incumbent Tim Mahoney.

This is normally a solidly Republican district, so consensus was that Mahoney's 50% to 48% win in 2006 could be attributed to the Mark Foley scandal. The Republican nominee Joe Negron's 2006 campaign was harmed by the fact that Foley's name remained on the ballot even though he was not a candidate, as his withdrawal from the race came too late to replace him on the ballot under Florida law. George W. Bush won this district by a 10-point margin in 2004 (CPVI=R+2).

Attorney Rooney won the Republican primary election against State Rep. Gayle Harrell and Palm Beach Gardens City Councilman Hal Valeche.

On October 12, 2008, it was revealed that Mahoney had an affair with a staffer, and had paid her $121,000 in a settlement to stave off a potential lawsuit. House Speaker Nancy Pelosi has called for an ethics inquiry. Two days later, CQ Politics changed their forecast on the race from "No Clear Favorite" to "Leans Republican".

- Race ranking and details from CQ Politics
- Campaign contributions from OpenSecrets

=== Predictions ===
Source	Ranking	As of
The Cook Political Report	Likely R (flip)	November 6, 2008
Rothenberg	Likely R (flip)	November 2, 2008
Sabato's Crystal Ball	Lean R (flip)	November 6, 2008
Real Clear Politics	Lean R (flip)	November 7, 2008
CQ Politics	Lean R (flip)	November 6, 2008

=== Results ===
Republican Tom Rooney, with 60 percent of the votes, defeated incumbent Congressman Tim Mahoney. This was the only district in Florida to switch from Democratic to Republican control in 2008.

Florida's 16th congressional district election, 2008
Party	Candidate	Votes	%
Republican	Tom Rooney	209,874	60.1
Democratic	Tim Mahoney (incumbent)	139,373	39.9
Total votes		349,247	100.00
Republican gain from Democratic			

== District 17 ==
2008 Florida's 17th congressional district election
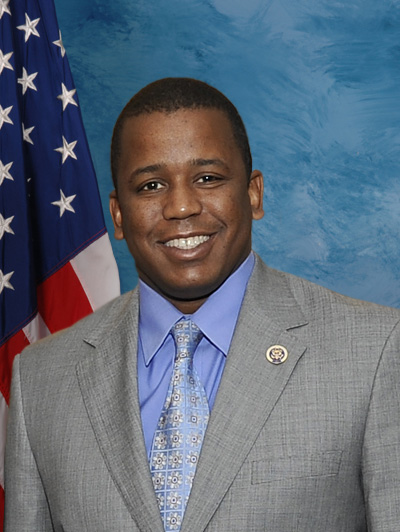
Nominee	Kendrick Meek
Party	Democratic
Popular vote	Unopposed
Percentage
U.S. Representative before election
Kendrick Meek
Democratic
Elected U.S. Representative
Kendrick Meek
Democratic

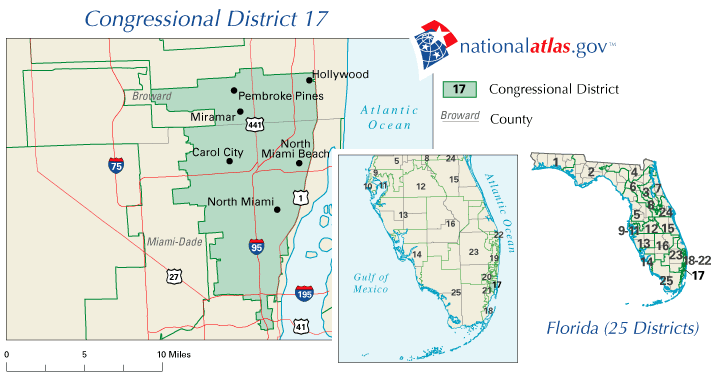

Democratic three-term incumbent Kendrick Meek ran unopposed in this heavily Democratic district (CPVI=D+35).

- Race ranking and details from CQ Politics
- Campaign contributions from OpenSecrets

=== Predictions ===
Source	Ranking	As of
The Cook Political Report	Safe D	November 6, 2008
Rothenberg	Safe D	November 2, 2008
Sabato's Crystal Ball	Safe D	November 6, 2008
Real Clear Politics	Safe D	November 7, 2008
CQ Politics	Safe D	November 6, 2008

Results

Florida's 17th congressional district election, 2008
Party	Candidate	Votes	%
Democratic	Kendrick Meek	Unopposed	

== District 18 ==
2008 Florida's 18th congressional district election
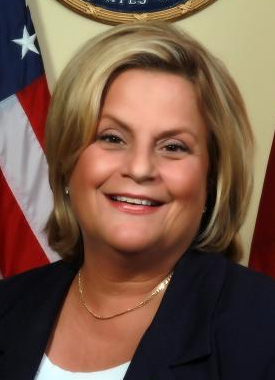

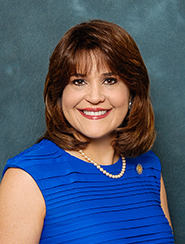
Nominee	Ileana Ros-Lehtinen	Annette Taddeo
Party	Republican	Democratic
Popular vote	140,617	102,372
Percentage	57.9%	42.1%
- County results Ros-Lehtinen: 50–60%
U.S. Representative before election
Ileana Ros-Lehtinen
Republican
Elected U.S. Representative
Ileana Ros-Lehtinen
Republican

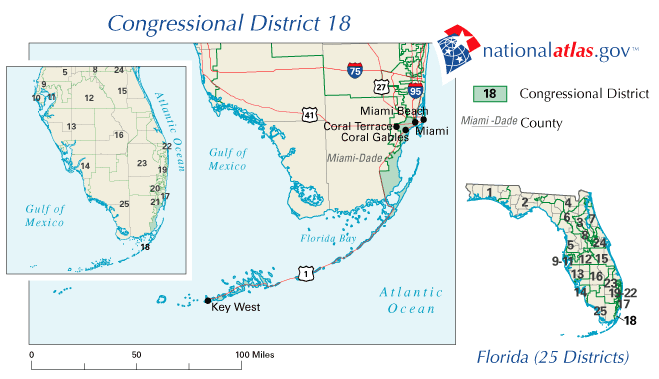

Republican incumbent Ileana Ros-Lehtinen has held this seat since 1989; however, her district has been increasingly trending Democratic in recent elections. The district contains many Miami suburbs and the entire Florida Keys. Founder and CEO of LanguageSpeak and Chair of the Women's Enterprise National Council's Leadership Forum Annette Taddeo was the Democratic nominee and was able to raise a significant sum of money. Nonetheless, polls throughout the campaign showed Ros-Lehtinen in the lead. CQ Politics forecasted the race as 'Republican Favored'.

- Race ranking and details from CQ Politics
- Campaign contributions from OpenSecrets
- Ros-Lehtinen (R-i) vs Taddeo (D) polls from Pollster.com

=== Predictions ===
Source	Ranking	As of
The Cook Political Report	Likely R	November 6, 2008
Rothenberg	Safe R	November 2, 2008
Sabato's Crystal Ball	Safe R	November 6, 2008
Real Clear Politics	Safe R	November 7, 2008
CQ Politics	Likely R	November 6, 2008

=== Results ===
Ileana Ros-Lehtinen defeated challenger Taddeo, receiving nearly 58 percent of the vote.

Florida's 18th congressional district election, 2008
Party	Candidate	Votes	%
Republican	Ileana Ros-Lehtinen (incumbent)	140,617	57.9
Democratic	Annette Taddeo	102,372	42.1
Total votes		242,989	100.00
Republican hold			

== District 19 ==
2008 Florida's 19th congressional district election
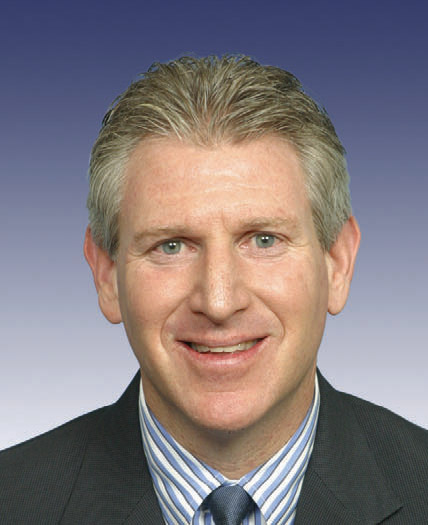

Nominee	Robert Wexler	Edward J. Lynch	Ben Graber
Party	Democratic	Republican	Independent
Popular vote	202,465	83,357	20,214
Percentage	66.2%	27.2%	6.6%
- County results Wexler: 60–70%
U.S. Representative before election
Robert Wexler
Democratic
Elected U.S. Representative
Robert Wexler
Democratic

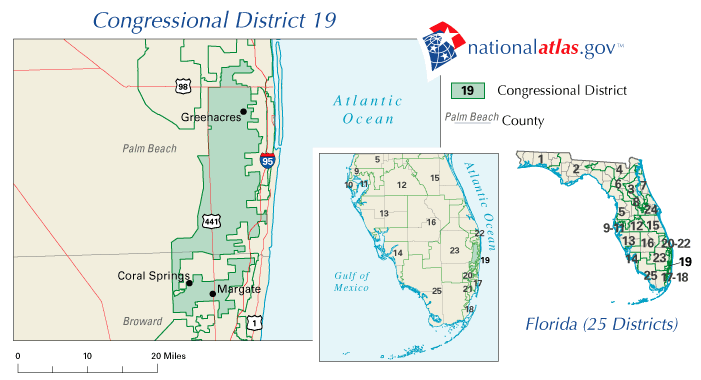

Democratic incumbent Robert Wexler, representing this district since 1997, faced Republican Edward J. Lynch and fellow Democrat Ben Graber, who chose to run as an independent candidate rather than compete against Wexler in the Democratic primary. Wexler had run opposed in the previous two elections. CQ Politics forecasted the race as 'Safe Democrat'.

- Race ranking and details from CQ Politics
- Campaign contributions from OpenSecrets

=== Predictions ===
Source	Ranking	As of
The Cook Political Report	Safe D	November 6, 2008
Rothenberg	Safe D	November 2, 2008
Sabato's Crystal Ball	Safe D	November 6, 2008
Real Clear Politics	Safe D	November 7, 2008
CQ Politics	Safe D	November 6, 2008

=== Results ===
Wexler retained his seat, receiving around 66 percent of the vote.

Florida's 19th congressional district election, 2008
Party	Candidate	Votes	%
Democratic	Robert Wexler (incumbent)	202,465	66.2
Republican	Edward J. Lynch	83,357	27.2
Independent	Ben Graber	20,214	6.6
Total votes		306,036	100.00
Democratic hold			

== District 20 ==
2008 Florida's 20th congressional district election
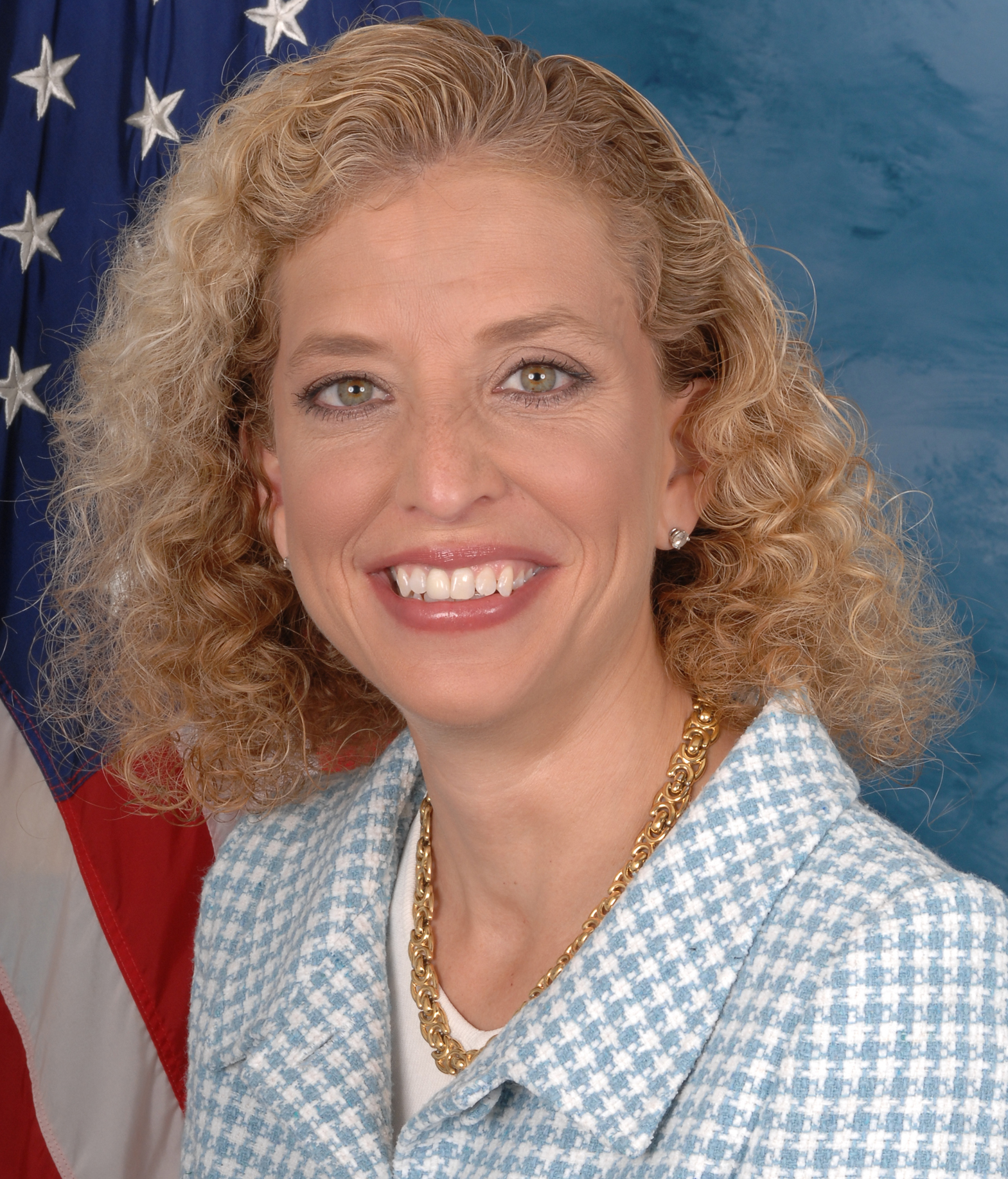

Nominee	Debbie Wasserman Schultz	Margaret Hostetter
Party	Democratic	Independent
Popular vote	202,832	58,958
Percentage	77.5%	22.5%
- County results Schultz: 70–80%
U.S. Representative before election
Debbie Wasserman Schultz
Democratic
Elected U.S. Representative
Debbie Wasserman Schultz
Democratic

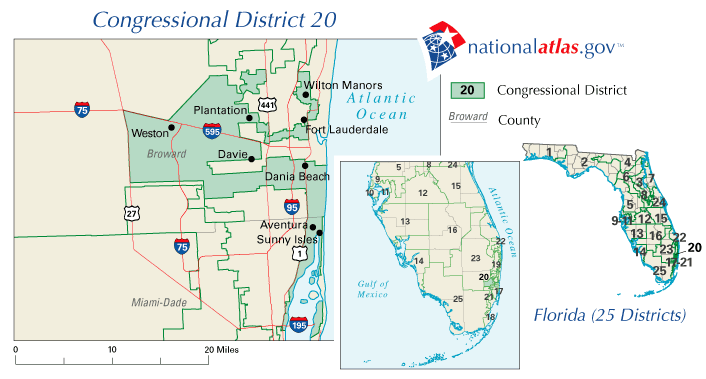

Democratic incumbent Debbie Wasserman Schultz (campaign website) has held this seat since 2005. Challengers Margaret Hostetter, who ran against Wasserman Schultz as a Republican in 2004 but chose to run as an independent in 2008, and Socialist write-in candidate Marc Luzietti (campaign website) were not expected to be serious threats to Wasserman Schultz. CQ Politics forecasted the race as 'Safe Democrat'.

- Race ranking and details from CQ Politics
- Campaign contributions from OpenSecrets

=== Predictions ===
Source	Ranking	As of
The Cook Political Report	Safe D	November 6, 2008
Rothenberg	Safe D	November 2, 2008
Sabato's Crystal Ball	Safe D	November 6, 2008
Real Clear Politics	Safe D	November 7, 2008
CQ Politics	Safe D	November 6, 2008

=== Results ===
As expected, Debbie Wasserman Schultz easily won reelection, receiving over 77 percent of the vote.

Florida's 20th congressional district election, 2008
Party	Candidate	Votes	%
Democratic	Debbie Wasserman Schultz (incumbent)	202,832	77.5
Independent	Margaret Hostetter	58,958	22.5
Socialist	Marc Luzietti (write-in)	9	0.0
Total votes		261,799	100.00
Democratic hold			

== District 21 ==
2008 Florida's 21st congressional district election
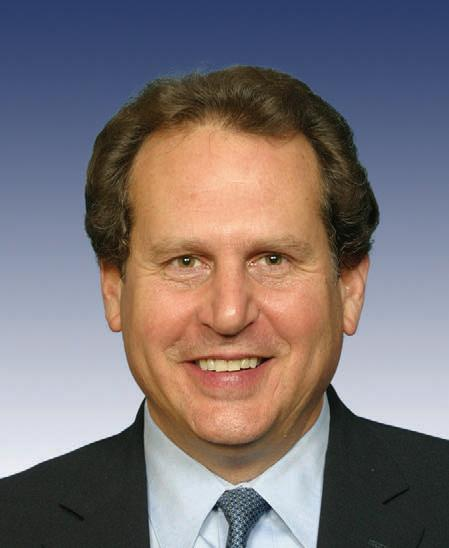

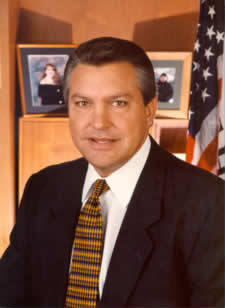
Nominee	Lincoln Diaz-Balart	Raul L. Martinez
Party	Republican	Democratic
Popular vote	137,226	99,776
Percentage	57.9%	42.1%
- County results Diaz-balart: 50–60% Martinez: 50–60%
U.S. Representative before election
Lincoln Diaz-Balart
Republican
Elected U.S. Representative
Lincoln Diaz-Balart
Republican

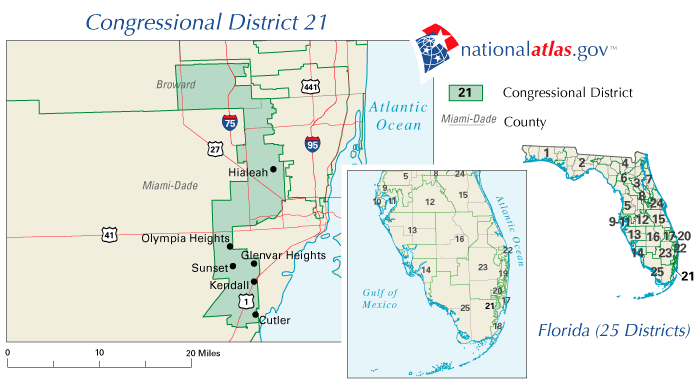

Republican incumbent Lincoln Diaz-Balart (campaign website) had faced little more than token opposition since taking office in 1993. This year, however, the race was expected to be much tougher for Diaz-Balart, as the Democratic nominee, former Hialeah Mayor Raul L. Martinez (campaign website), is very well known in the area and could be a formidable challenger. CQ Politics forecasted the race as 'Leans Republican'. Rothenberg rated it as 'Pure Toss-Up.' Cook rated it as 'Republican Toss-Up'. Bush won 57% of the vote here in 2004 (CPVI=R+6).

On May 22, 2008, Diaz-Balart did not attend a debate hosted by the South Florida AFL-CIO with Martinez due to scheduling and venue issues. A July 7 poll conducted by a noted Democratic polster, Sergio Bendixen, showed Diaz-Balart ahead of Martinez by a four-point margin, 41 to 37 percent, with 22 percent undecided. David Hill, the Diaz-Balart brothers' pollster, said Lincoln's internal polling shows the congressman with a 12-point lead over Martinez and a "double-digit advantage over his opponent in virtually every significant segment of the electorate."

On August 1, 2008, a leading Washington analyst, Rothenberg Political Report, reported that they see a "possible re-election trouble for Lincoln Diaz-Balart". According to an August 14, 2008 Time article, Lincoln Diaz-Balart faces a competitive race. It also said that "Democratic voter registration in Miami-Dade County, as in other places, is up, and Republican registration is down."

On August 25, 2008, Lincoln Diaz-Balart agreed to debate Martinez, at a Greater Miami Chamber of Commerce event at noon on October 8. On August 26, 2008, Martinez challenged Diaz-Balart to an additional debate in Denver, Colorado, which both candidates were visiting during the 2008 Democratic National Convention.

In a SurveyUSA poll sponsored by Roll Call conducted in August 2008, Martinez led Diaz-Balart (48% to 46%) among likely voters. According to the poll, Diaz-Balart enjoyed 70% support from Cuban-Americans in the district. The poll's demographics (which were chosen by the pollster in 2008) are different from those of the district (based on the US census of 2000.) 51% of those questioned were Hispanic (34% of respondents were Cuban and 17% were non-Cuban). The percentage of Hispanics in the district is higher at 69.7%. Later polls, however, showed Diaz-Balart back in the lead.

- Race ranking and details from CQ Politics
- Campaign contributions from OpenSecrets
- Diaz-Balart (R-i) vs Martinez (D) polls from Pollster.com

=== Predictions ===
Source	Ranking	As of
The Cook Political Report	Tossup	November 6, 2008
Rothenberg	Tossup	November 2, 2008
Sabato's Crystal Ball	Lean R	November 6, 2008
Real Clear Politics	Tossup	November 7, 2008
CQ Politics	Lean R	November 6, 2008

=== Results ===
Despite predictions of a close election, Lincoln Diaz-Balart won reelection by a fairly comfortable margin, receiving just under 58 percent of the vote.

Florida's 21st congressional district election, 2008
Party	Candidate	Votes	%
Republican	Lincoln Diaz-Balart (incumbent)	137,226	57.9
Democratic	Raul L. Martinez	99,776	42.1
Total votes		237,002	100.00
Republican hold			

== District 22 ==
2008 Florida's 22nd congressional district election
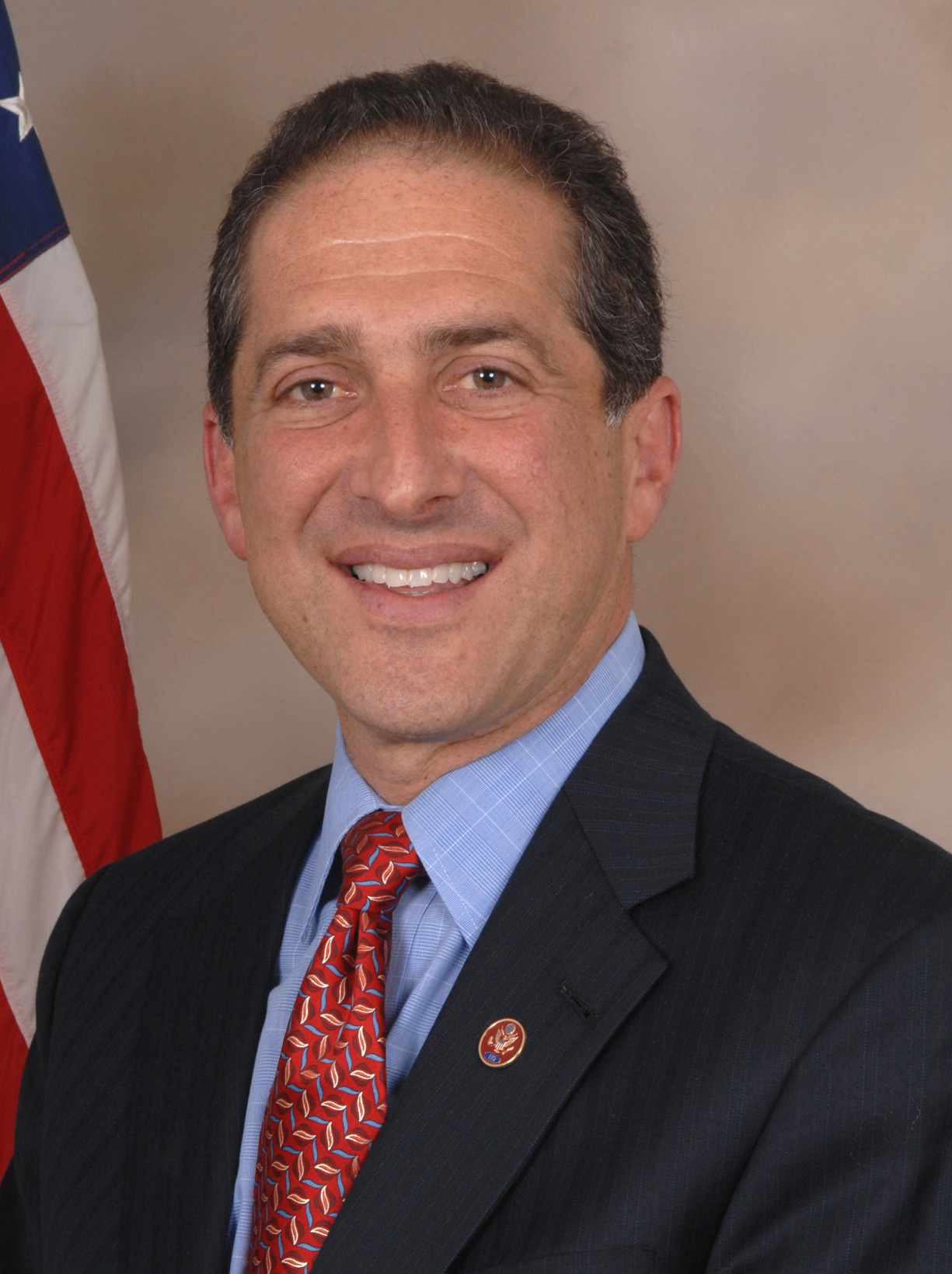

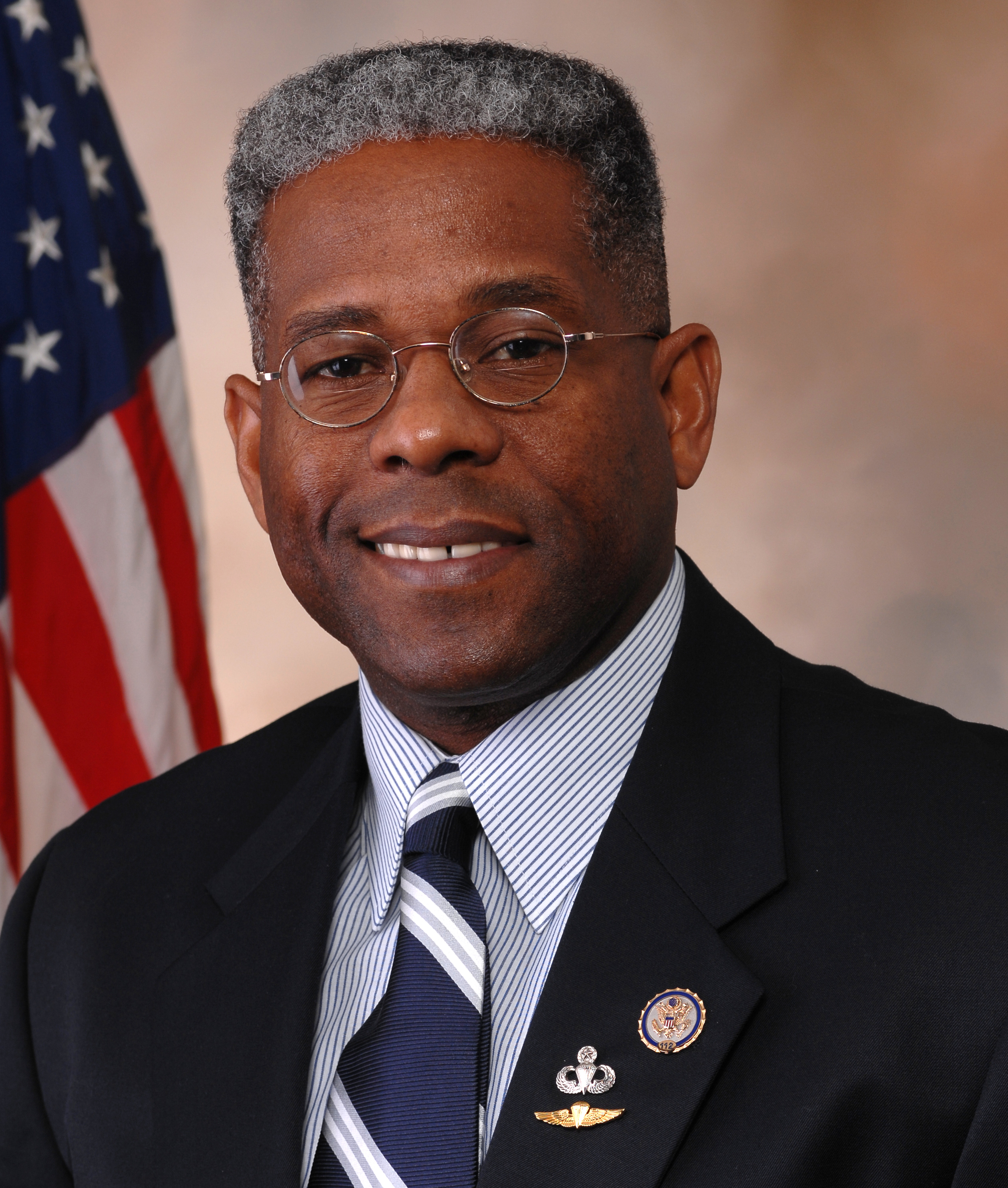
Nominee	Ron Klein	Allen West
Party	Democratic	Republican
Popular vote	169,041	140,104
Percentage	54.7%	45.3%
- County results Klein: 50–60%
U.S. Representative before election
Ron Klein
Democratic
Elected U.S. Representative
Ron Klein
Democratic

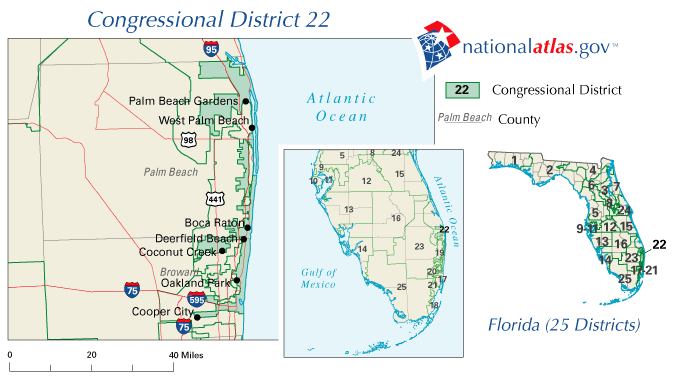

First-term Democratic incumbent Ron Klein was challenged by former army officer and Iraq War veteran Allen West. Michael Prysner, an Iraq War veteran, peace activist, and college student, ran as a write-in candidate on the Party for Socialism and Liberation ticket. CQ Politics forecasted the race as 'Democrat Favored'.

Republicans suffered a setback when popular former Boca Raton Mayor Steven Abrams announced he would not run. West and former navy pilot Mark Flagg announced they would run. Neurosurgeon Robert Brodner and 2006 Connecticut U.S. senatorial candidate Alan Schlesinger were also potential candidates. This Fort Lauderdale area district barely went to John Kerry in 2004 (CPVI=D+4).

- Race ranking and details from CQ Politics
- Campaign contributions from OpenSecrets

=== Predictions ===
Source	Ranking	As of
The Cook Political Report	Safe D	November 6, 2008
Rothenberg	Safe D	November 2, 2008
Sabato's Crystal Ball	Safe D	November 6, 2008
Real Clear Politics	Safe D	November 7, 2008
CQ Politics	Likely D	November 6, 2008

=== Results ===
Ron Klein successfully defended his seat, receiving slightly less than 55 percent of the vote.

Florida's 22nd congressional district election, 2008
Party	Candidate	Votes	%
Democratic	Ron Klein (incumbent)	169,041	54.7
Republican	Allen West	140,104	45.3
Independent	Michael Prysner (write-in)	6	0.0
Total votes		309,151	100.00
Democratic hold			

== District 23 ==
2008 Florida's 23rd congressional district election
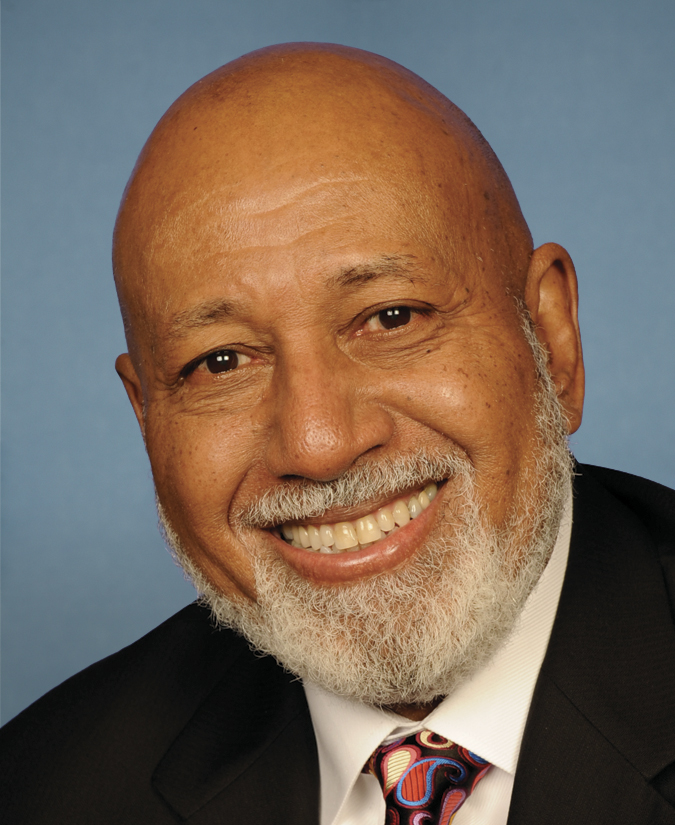

Nominee	Alcee Hastings	Marion Dennis Thorpe Jr.
Party	Democratic	Republican
Popular vote	172,835	37,431
Percentage	82.2%	17.8%
- County results Hastings: 50–60% 70–80% 80–90%
U.S. Representative before election
Alcee Hastings
Democratic
Elected U.S. Representative
Alcee Hastings
Democratic

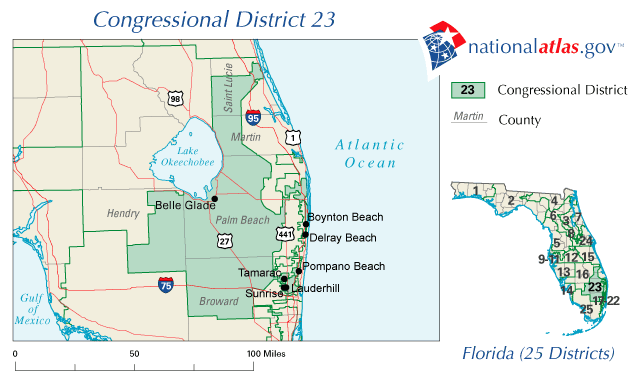

Democratic incumbent Alcee Hastings, who has held this seat since 1993, faced Republican Marion Dennis Thorpe Jr. in this heavily Democratic district. CQ Politics forecasted the race as 'Safe Democrat'.

- Race ranking and details from CQ Politics
- Campaign contributions from OpenSecrets

=== Predictions ===
Source	Ranking	As of
The Cook Political Report	Safe D	November 6, 2008
Rothenberg	Safe D	November 2, 2008
Sabato's Crystal Ball	Safe D	November 6, 2008
Real Clear Politics	Safe D	November 7, 2008
CQ Politics	Safe D	November 6, 2008

=== Results ===
Alcee Hastings easily retained his seat with over 82 percent of the vote.

Florida's 23rd congressional district election, 2008
Party	Candidate	Votes	%
Democratic	Alcee Hastings (incumbent)	172,835	82.2
Republican	Marion Dennis Thorpe Jr.	37,431	17.8
Independent	April Cook (write-in)	40	0.0
Total votes		210,306	100.00
Democratic hold			

== District 24 ==
2008 Florida's 24th congressional district election
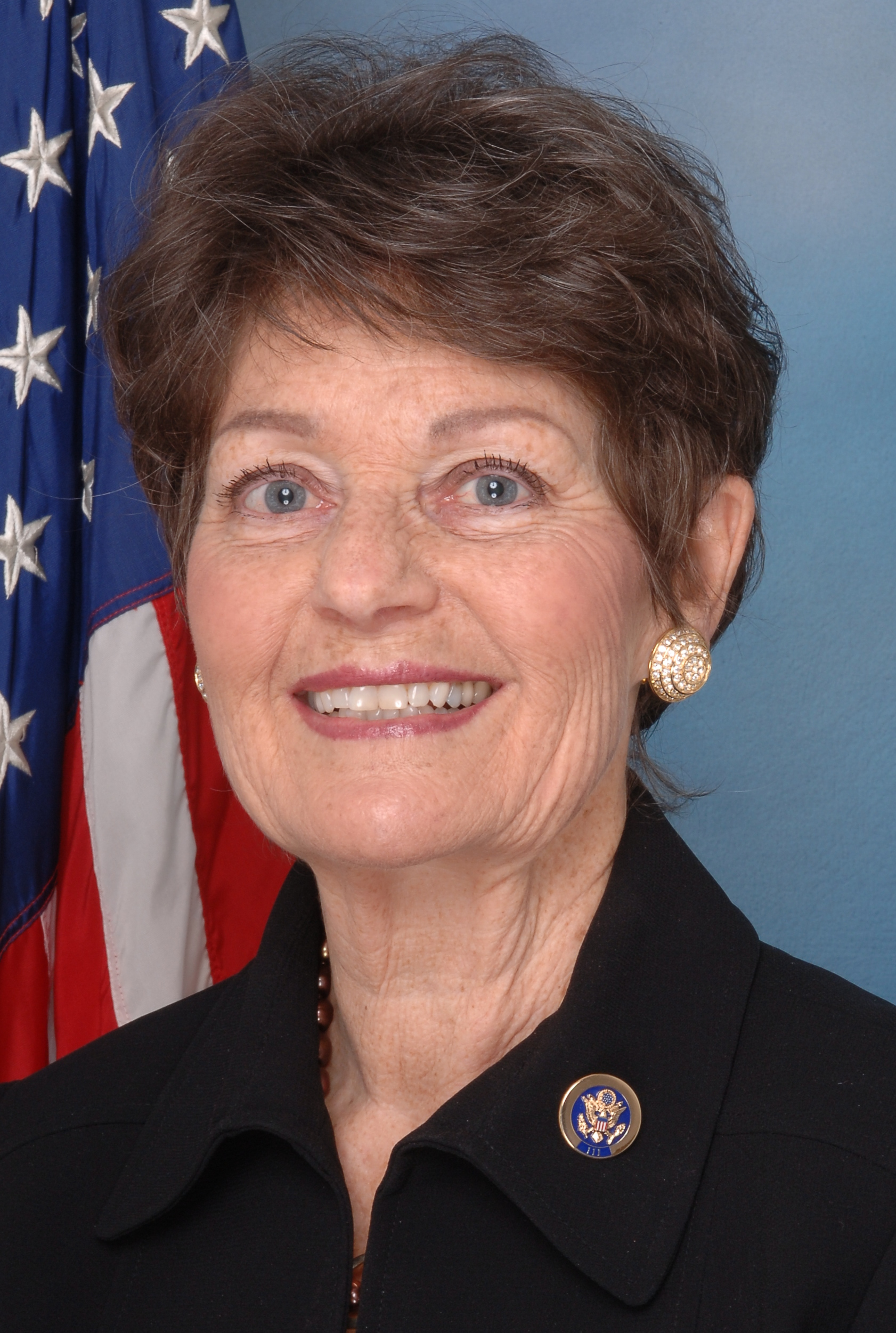

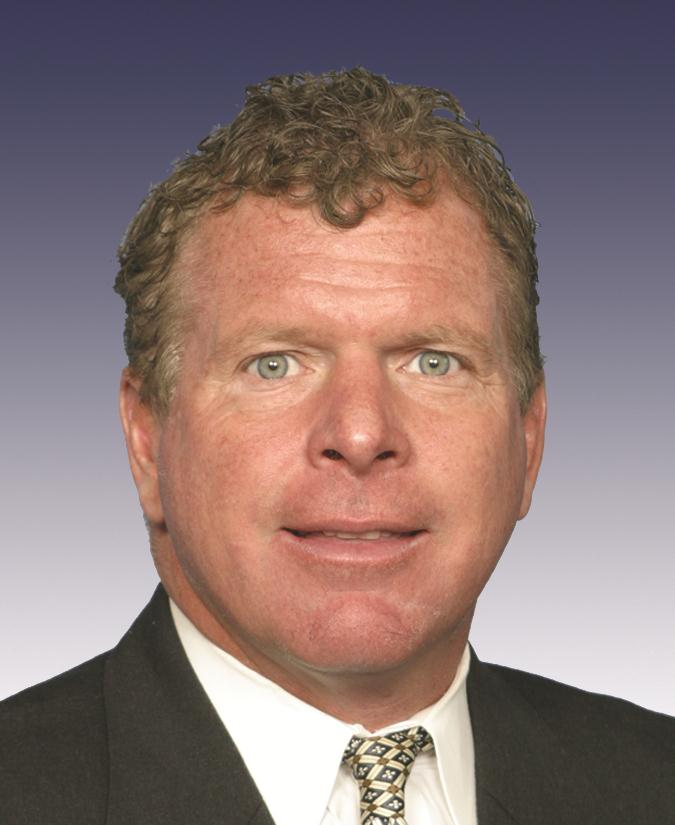
Nominee	Suzanne Kosmas	Tom Feeney
Party	Democratic	Republican
Popular vote	211,284	151,863
Percentage	57.2%	41.1%
- County results Kosmas: 50–60% 60–70%
U.S. Representative before election
Tom Feeney
Republican
Elected U.S. Representative
Suzanne Kosmas
Democratic

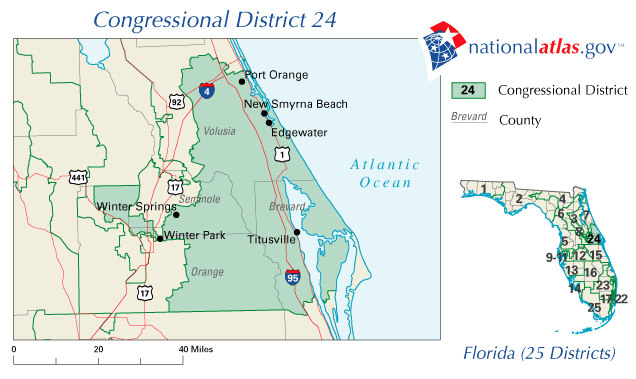

Three-term Republican incumbent Tom Feeney (campaign website) faced Democratic nominee and former State Representative Suzanne Kosmas (campaign website) and independent Gaurav Bhola. On October 21, 2008, CQ Politics switched its outlook on the race from "No Clear Favorite" to "Leans Democratic."

The district includes the Orlando suburbs as well as the Space Coast of Florida. In 2006, Feeney was re-elected by 58% to 42%. Although Feeney reportedly drew the district for himself while serving as speaker of the state house, the district is actually somewhat marginal on paper (CPVI=R+3). Bush took 55 percent of the vote in this district in 2004.

- Race ranking and details from CQ Politics
- Campaign contributions from OpenSecrets
- Feeney (R-i) vs Kosmas (D) polls from Pollster.com

=== Predictions ===
Source	Ranking	As of
The Cook Political Report	Lean D (flip)	November 6, 2008
Rothenberg	Likely D (flip)	November 2, 2008
Sabato's Crystal Ball	Lean D (flip)	November 6, 2008
Real Clear Politics	Lean D (flip)	November 7, 2008
CQ Politics	Lean D (flip)	November 6, 2008

=== Results ===
Suzanne Kosmas ousted incumbent Tom Feeney, receiving around 57 percent of the vote. This district was one of two in Florida to switch from Republican to Democratic control in 2008, along with District 8.

Florida's 24th congressional district election, 2008
Party	Candidate	Votes	%
Democratic	Suzanne Kosmas	211,284	57.2
Republican	Tom Feeney (incumbent)	151,863	41.1
Independent	Gaurav Bhola	6,223	1.7
Total votes		379,370	100.00
Democratic gain from Republican			

== District 25 ==
2008 Florida's 25th congressional district election
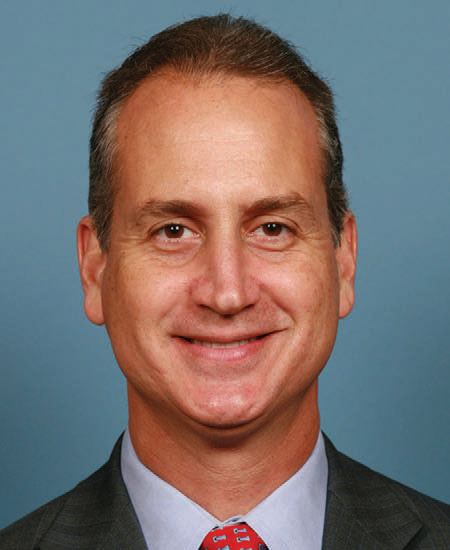

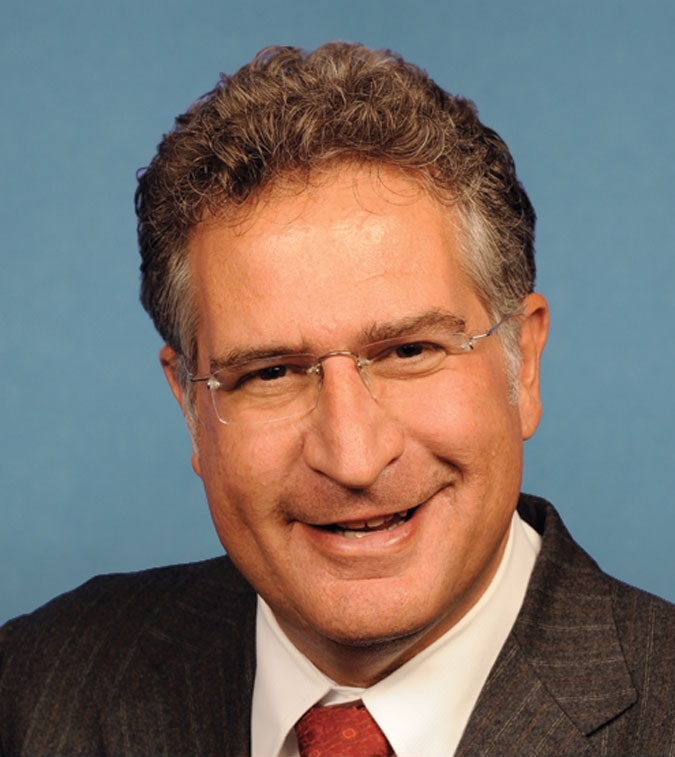
Nominee	Mario Diaz-Balart	Joe Garcia
Party	Republican	Democratic
Popular vote	130,891	115,820
Percentage	53.1%	46.9%
- County results Diaz-balart: 50–60% Garcia: 50–60%
U.S. Representative before election
Mario Diaz-Balart
Republican
Elected U.S. Representative
Mario Diaz-Balart
Republican

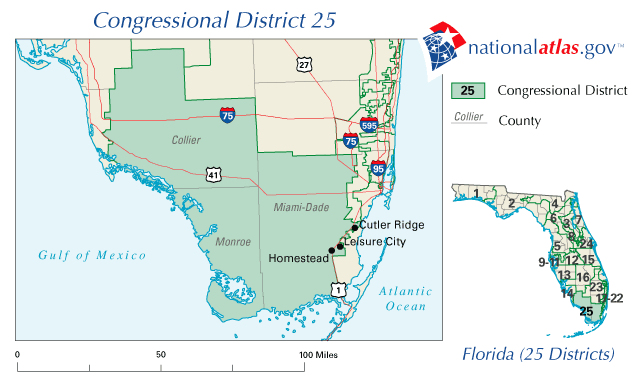

Republican three-term incumbent Mario Diaz-Balart faced Miami-Dade County Democratic Party chairman Joe Garcia (campaign website), a former executive director of the Cuban American National Foundation (CANF). CQ Politics forecasted the race as 'Leans Republican'. The Rothenberg Political Report as 'Toss-Up/Tilt Republican'. The Cook Political Report as 'Republican Toss Up'. Bush won 56% of the vote here in 2004 (CPVI=R+4).

Garcia announced on February 7, 2008, his candidacy for the U.S. House of Representatives in Florida's 25th congressional district. In March 2008, the Garcia's campaign announced that noted political strategist Joe Trippi, the campaign manager for 2004 presidential candidate and former Vermont governor Howard Dean, was joining the campaign team as Senior Media Adviser. In April 2008, Garcia held a controversial fundraiser with Representative Charles B. Rangel, who has met repeatedly with Fidel Castro and pushed legislation that would allow U.S. citizens to travel to Cuba and allow American firms to do business there. Garcia said he "has serious disagreements with Rangel on Cuba. But having a relationship with the chairman of the powerful House Ways and Means Committee would help him bring federal money back to the district." Diaz-Balart claimed Garcia had a radical left-wing agenda including supporting higher taxes on working families and appeasing the nation's enemies.

An August 14, 2008 Time article labeled the race as competitive, pointing out that "Democratic voter registration in Miami-Dade County, as in other places, is up, and Republican registration is down".

According to many commentators, Garcia is Mario Diaz-Balart's most formidable political opponent ever because of the amount of money that he has raised and the national media attention that he has generated Nonetheless, the Rothenberg Political Report and CQ Politics rated the seat as "Toss-up/Tilt Republican," the Cook Political Report rated the district as "Likely Republican," and the Crystal Ball has rated the district as "Safe Republican"

A poll of the race, that was conducted June 6 to 22, by noted Democratic pollster, Sergio Bendixen, showed Diaz-Balart ahead of Garcia 44 percent to 39 percent, with 17 percent undecided. As of August 6, 2008, Garcia has raised $1,001,313 with $789,667 cash on hand for the 2007-2008 cycle. Mario Diaz-Balart, the five-year incumbent, has raised $1,188,193 and has $1,029,556 cash on hand during the same cycle.

- Race ranking and details from CQ Politics
- Campaign contributions from OpenSecrets
- Diaz-Balart (R-i) vs Garcia (D) polls from Pollster.com

=== Predictions ===
Source	Ranking	As of
The Cook Political Report	Tossup	November 6, 2008
Rothenberg	Tilt R	November 2, 2008
Sabato's Crystal Ball	Lean D (flip)	November 6, 2008
Real Clear Politics	Tossup	November 7, 2008
CQ Politics	Lean R	November 6, 2008

=== Results ===
Mario Diaz-Balart held off challenger Joe Garcia, receiving slightly more than 53 percent of the vote.

Florida's 25th congressional district election, 2008
Party	Candidate	Votes	%
Republican	Mario Diaz-Balart (incumbent)	130,891	53.1
Democratic	Joe Garcia	115,820	46.9
Total votes		246,711	100.00
Republican hold			

Preceded by 2006 elections	United States House elections in Florida; 2008	Succeeded by 2010 elections
