= Sarasota Bank =

- Founded: September 15, 1992; 34 years ago
- Defunct: December 4, 2003
- Fate: Absorbed by Colonial Bank
- Headquarters: Sarasota, Florida, United States
- Parent: Sarasota BanCorporation

Sarasota Bank was an independent Sarasota, Florida-based bank operated by Sarasota BanCorporation. It was sold to Colonial BancGroup in a stock swap worth $40.5 million. It was established September 15, 1992, and went inactive December 4, 2003, when it was subsumed into Colonial Bank.
