= Malachy Kilbride =

Malachy Kilbride is an Irish-American social justice and peace activist who primarily works with Washington Peace Center in Washington, D.C. He is a former board member of this non-profit organization. He was born in New York City and spent part of his childhood in Dublin, Ireland. He is the son of an Irish immigrant, his father, Aidan Kilbride, and his mother, Mary Moran Kilbride, the daughter of Irish immigrants to New York City. He is the nephew of Fintan Kilbride. He has two brothers, Aidan Jr. and Barney.

== Activism ==
Through the Washington Peace Center Kilbride works as an activist-organizer on a variety of peace and justice issues including opposing the war and occupation of Iraq and Afghanistan, the abolition of torture, opposing the USA PATRIOT Act, the US Military Commissions Act of 2006, the closing of the Guantanamo Bay prison camp, and supporting the struggle of the Palestinian people calling for an end to the Israeli occupation by organizing demonstrations against the American Israel Public Affairs Committee (AIPAC) and Christians United for Israel, CUFI.

Witness Against Torture is one of the groups he works with calling for the closure of the Guantanamo prison camp where the United States is holding prisoners as "unlawful enemy combatants". He is involved with the 100 Days Campaign initiated by Witness Against Torture beginning on January 11, 2009, through April 30, 2009.

Prior to his involvement with Washington Peace Center he was actively involved with the DC Anti-War Network, DAWN for several years until the demise of DAWN. He has also participated in working with Northern Virginians for Peace and Justice, Declaration of Peace, and continuing his involvement with the National Campaign for Nonviolent Resistance.

== Anti-war protests ==
Since the invasion and occupation of Iraq, Kilbride has participated in numerous acts of nonviolent civil resistance or civil disobedience risking arrest. He has been arrested many times for these peaceful actions, placed on trial, including one of the largest civil resistance actions ever at the White House in September 2005 with activist and military mother Cindy Sheehan.

On March 29, 2007, he joined a gathering of people inside the United States Hart Senate Office Building speaking out against the Iraq War and occupation in an action called "The Tombstone Action" in which those assembled placed cardboard tombstones in memory of US soldiers and Iraqi civilians killed in Iraq. They read out the names of those who had been killed drawing attention to those killed after the Democrats won control of the US Congress in the November 2006 elections. This demonstration occurred on the same day the US Senate voted for continued funding for the Iraq occupation. He was arrested with Ellen Barfield, Gordon Clark, David Barrows, Eve Tetaz, Joy First, and Sam Crooke. They were subsequently charged with unlawful conduct and received a jury trial in July 2007. They faced up to 6 months imprisonment if found guilty. A jury found them not guilty after they defended themselves pro se in a trial that lasted almost one week in DC Superior Court.

He is serving a one-year unsupervised probation for his conviction of "Unlawful Free Speech" inside the United States Supreme Court. In this most recent action of civil resistance, inside the United States Supreme Court, on January 11, 2008, he called for the closing of the Guantanamo Bay prison camp by kneeling and praying. On January 11, 2009, he began a fast until January 20, 2009, joining others launching the 100 Days Campaign calling for the shut-down of the Guantanamo prison camp.

== Quaker activities ==
He is a Quaker, a member of The Religious Society of Friends, belonging to Friends Meeting of Washington in Washington DC where he serves as clerk of the Peace and Social Concerns Committee in addition to serving on the Peace and Social Concerns Committee of Baltimore Yearly Meeting. In September 2008 he joined the Board of Directors of William Penn House in Washington, DC.
