= Louis Vitale =

American priest and activist (1932–2023)

Friar Louis Vitale OFM
- Friar
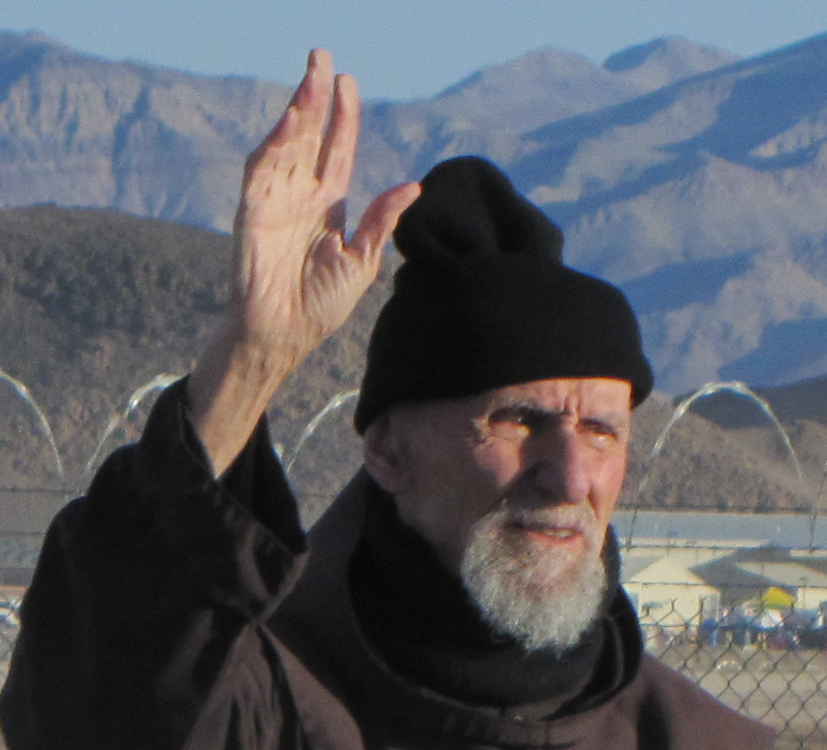
- Vitale demonstrating against weaponized drones just before being arrested at Creech Air Force Base, Nevada c. 2010 to 2012
- Diocese: Santa Barbara, San Francisco

Personal details
- Born: June 1, 1932 San Gabriel, California, U.S.
- Died: September 6, 2023 (aged 91) Oakland, California, U.S.
- Denomination: Catholic
- Occupation: Friar of the Franciscan order
- Education: Loyola, PhD UCLA

Louis Vitale, OFM, (June 1, 1932 – September 6, 2023) was an American Franciscan friar, peace activist, and a co-founder of Nevada Desert Experience. His religious beliefs led him to participate in civil disobedience actions at peace demonstrations and acts of religious witness over 40 years. In the name of peace, Vitale has been arrested more than 400 times. Vitale stated that Francis of Assisi, Mahatma Gandhi and Martin Luther King Jr. provided him with inspiration.

== Early life and education ==
Louis Vitale was born on June 1, 1932, in San Gabriel, California. His family operated a lucrative fish processing business. After graduating in 1954 from Loyola University, now Loyola Marymount University, Vitale enlisted in the US Air Force. Vitale's main role in the Air Force was that of an intercept officer, in charge of radio communications. Vitale took his vows as a Franciscan friar in 1960 when he was 28 years old. He was awarded a PhD for original research in sociology in September 1972, from University of California, Los Angeles. From 1979 to 1988, Vitale served as the provincial superior of the Franciscan Friars of the province of St. Barbara. He served as the pastor at St. Boniface Catholic Church for 12 years in the Tenderloin of San Francisco, California.

== Pace e Bene ==
Louis Vitale was one of the founders of Pace e Bene, a nonviolence service, in 1989. The name means Peace and all good. Other founders included: Sr. Rosemary Lynch, Alain Richard, Peter Ediger and Julia Occhiogrosso, who were all experienced peace activists. Pace e Bene developed educational programs for nonviolent living with an emphasis on spirituality. In 2005, Pace e Bene published a book, Engage, which described Pace e Bene's programs. The programs, as described in the book, were designed to encourage "the discovery, internalization and use of the power of nonviolence for personal and social change". Hundreds of nonviolence study groups were organized by Pace e Bene between 1989 and 2010.

== Nevada Desert Experience ==
In 1981, Vitale received a letter from Rome asking Franciscans to do something creative in 1982 to honor the 800th anniversary of the birth of St. Francis. Vitale took this to heart. The First Nevada Lenten Experience was held at the Nevada test site, a series of witness and protest actions held at the atomic bomb test site near Las Vegas, Nevada. This was the precursor to the Nevada Desert Experience. Louis Vitale with Anne Bucher, Michael Affleck, Duncan MacMurdy, and two Franciscan friars, Ed Dunn and Terry Symens, founded the Nevada Desert Experience in 1984. Over the years, Corbin Harney and the Shundahai Network worked with NDE, holding many protests of the government's continued nuclear weapons work. NDE worked with Corbin Harney in protests against establishing a repository for radioactive waste at Yucca Mountain, 100 mi (160 km) from Las Vegas.

== Arrests and protests ==
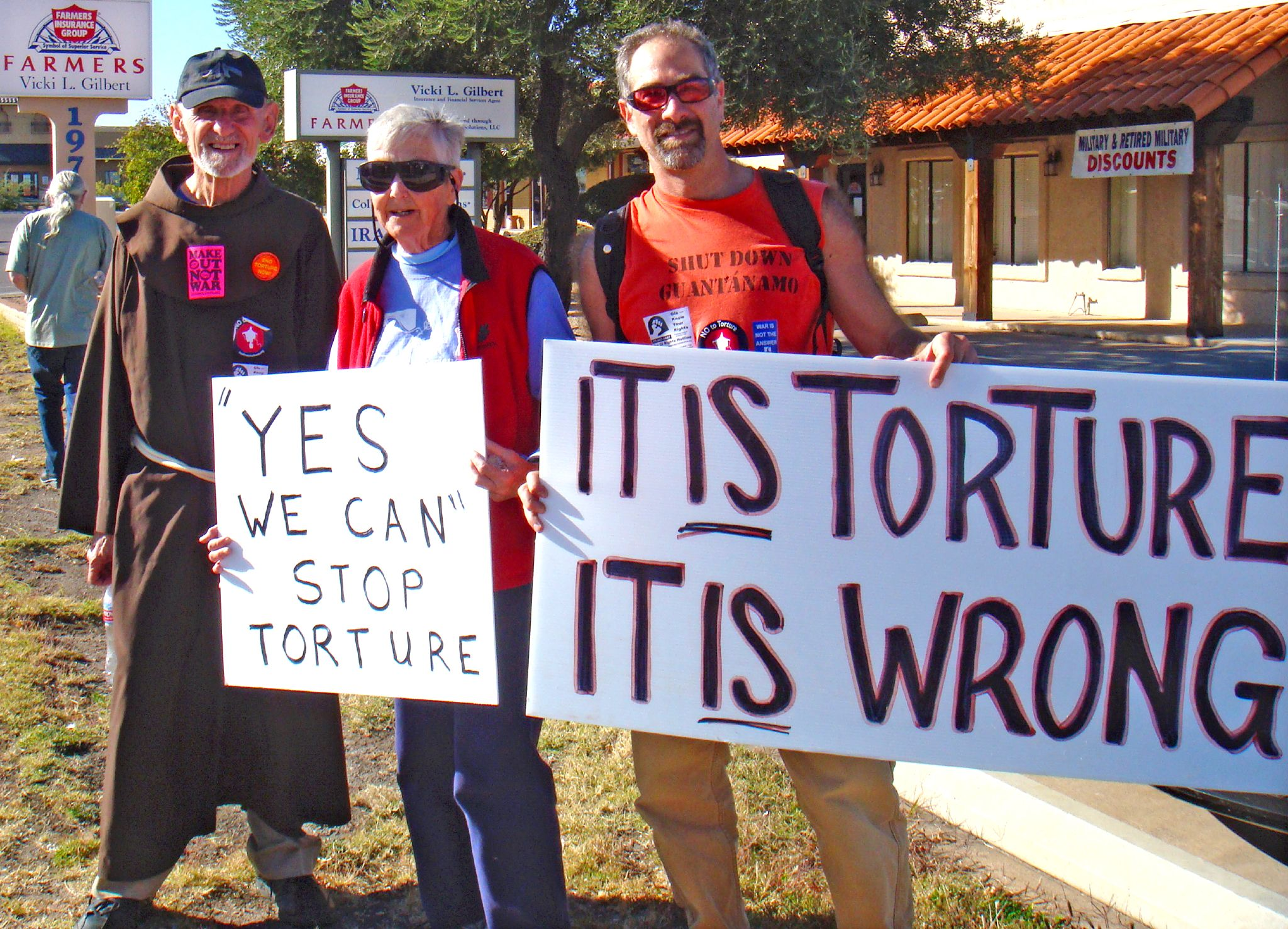
Louis Vitale, Megan Rice, Jim Haber at Ft. Huachuca, Arizona, 2008.

Vitale participated in numerous protests and was arrested hundreds of times. Examples include:

- April, 2005, Vitale was arrested at the Nevada National Security Site and sent to Beatty Jail to say farewell to the "Justice of the Peace" while simultaneously the Navajo Nation banned uranium mining and Pope Benedict XVI was elected. He and his accomplice were stopping NNSS busses from getting workers to their job sites.
- On November 19, 2006, Vitale was arrested at Fort Huachuca in Arizona with Jesuit Fr. Steve Kelly. They were protesting at the military compound responsible for training the US military in interrogation methods. The protest was against the US policy of using torture at Abu Gharib and the Guantanamo Bay Detention Camp.
- In 2007, Vitale was arrested at Vandenberg Air Force Base protesting Intercontinental Ballistic Missile (ICBM) Testing. Vitale was arrested at the Nevada Test site along with actor Martin Sheen and many others.
- On April 9, 2009, Vitale with John Dear, Eve Tetaz arrested at Creech Air Force Base protesting UAV Drone attacks in Pakistan.
- In October 2009, Vitale and a newlywed couple from New Mexico distributed fliers in Sunnyvale's Lockheed-Martin traffic.
- In November 2009, Vitale crossed the line at Ft Benning to protest the Western Hemisphere Institute for Security Cooperation. He served six months in a federal prison as a result.
- August 2009, Megan Rice and Louis Vitale were arrested at Vandenberg Air Force Base protesting a test of a Minuteman III Intercontinental Ballistic missile (ICBM) launched approximately 4,000 miles to the Kwajalein Atoll in the Marshall Islands.
- On December 31, 2009, Vitale planned to join the Gaza Freedom March, but after being stopped by the Egyptian government from making the trek, Vitale joined 22 others in a fast and protest.
- In November 2010, Vitale crossed the line (deliberately trespassing) at Ft Benning to protest the U.S. Army's Western Hemisphere Institute for Security Cooperation. He served six months at Federal Correctional Institution Lompoc for that action.
- On January 27, 2011, Rice, with Kathy Kelly, John Dear, and Louis Vitale, were convicted of trespassing following a protest against weaponized drones at Creech Air Force Base.
- At the 2012 August Drone convention in Las Vegas, Vitale registered and paid to attend and was threatened with arrest.

== Death ==
Louis Vitale died in Oakland, California, on September 6, 2023, at the age of 91.

== Awards and recognition ==
- 1999 Doctor of humane letters honorary degree: Quincy University in Illinois
- 2001 Pope Paul VI Teacher of Peace award given by PAX Christi USA
- 2003 Human Rights Award from Global Exchange
- 2003 The Voice of Peace Award awarded by School of the Americas Watch (March 9)
- 2004 Dignity: Pax e Bonum Award: given by St. Boniface Church San Francisco (March 23)
- 2004 Peter J Sammon Award: given by Interfaith Coalition for Immigrant Rights.(October 14)
- 2006 Jefferson Award for Community Service from KTVU Channel 5 San Francisco
- 2012 Honorary Doctorate from the Catholic Theological Union in Chicago
- 2019 Lifetime Achievement Award To Pace e Bene Co-founder Louie Vitale

== See also ==
- List of peace activists

== Books ==
Wittner, Lawrence S, Confronting the Bomb 2009 Stanford University Press
