= Pete Perry (activist) =

American peace activist

Peter Perry (born October 31, 1969, in Washington, D.C.) is a peace and social justice activist who has been affiliated with the National Campaign for Nonviolent Resistance and the Washington Peace Center.

Perry helped organize one of the protests on the second inauguration of President George W. Bush on January 20, 2005, in Washington DC.

On February 9, 2005, Perry and activists David Barrows and Midge Potts protested US torture and the nomination and confirmation hearings of Alberto Gonzalez for United States Attorney General. The demonstration occurred on the steps of The United States Supreme Court. The three were subsequently convicted in DC Superior Court June 30, 2005, for violating Title 40 sec. 6135 of US Code. However, they appealed to DC Superior Court and on January 23, 2007, in that appeal, the Czech Ambassador to The United Nations, Martin Palous, appeared on their behalf.

Perry continued protesting the Iraq War, and as a resident of Maryland, at that time, he joined other peace activists in early 2007 "occupying" the Capitol Hill office of Senator Barbara Mikulski.

By 2008 Perry had expanded his activism with the Washington Peace Center to include addressing the apparent rise in anti-gay violence in Washington, D.C. Due to several violent anti-gay attacks Perry organized with other communities in Washington, D.C.

Perry was a lead organizer of one of the first anti-war protests at the White House during President Barack Obama's administration in October 2009. This action resulted in more than 60 peaceful protesters arrested on the White House sidewalk.

On May 21, 2009, Perry, Steve Mihalis, Eve Tetaz, and Ellen Barfield protested the funding of the spreading war and the occupation of Afghanistan. They interrupted Admiral Michael Mullen, Chair of the Joint Chiefs of Staff as he spoke to US Senate Foreign Relations Committee chair, US Senator John Kerry. The committee was discussing President Barack Obama's counter-terrorism strategy in Afghanistan and Pakistan. Perry stood up and quoted Senator Kerry's own words from Kerry's antiwar protests in which he said "“How do you ask someone to be the last American soldier to die for a mistake?”

As a result of the Senate Foreign Relations Committee protest, Perry and Barfield were sentenced by Judge Lynn Liebovitz in December 2009 after being convicted by a jury. Barfield was sentenced to 25 days in jail, and Perry received a four-day sentence. They were also given lengthy stay-away orders from Capitol Hill. Tetaz was also sentenced to 25 days in jail on January 25, 2010.

Perry has recently taken a much less visible role in activism, although he donates to various small progressive organizations.

== Other activities ==
Perry was the coordinator of the Washington Peace Center in 2007.

In 2011 Perry was an organizer with the Bradley Manning Support Network.
