= National Campaign for Nonviolent Resistance =

American anti-war organization (2002-)

Founded in 2002, the National Campaign for Nonviolent Resistance (NCNR) is a network of individuals and organizations in the United States committed to ending the war in Iraq, using the nonviolent practices and disciplines of Mahatma Gandhi and Martin Luther King Jr. through nonviolent resistance.

According to its Website, the coalition failed to prevent the start of the Iraq War in March 2003, but it continues "to engage in nonviolent direct action to end the war and the occupation. The group was founded as the Iraq Pledge of Resistance, and in expanding its focus, became the National Campaign for Nonviolent Resistance.

"As a group with lots of direct action experience, NCNR has consistently encouraged organizations and individuals to recognize the difference between civil disobedience and civil resistance. We see the difference as being important in the struggle for nonviolent, positive social change."

Instead of breaking unjust laws in order to bring attention to injustice, actions organized and initiated by NCNR focus on highlighting the illegal policies and practices of the government and elected and appointed decision makers. Typically NCNR participants go to court in order to continue to speak out against the unlawful conduct of government officials in pursuing aggressive wars.

Among the largest and most significant of NCNR's acts of civil resistance was the September 26, 2005 action at the White House sidewalk, with Cindy Sheehan, following a major anti-war mobilization. Although United for Peace and Justice joined and promoted this action, it was mostly organized by NCNR.

Other NCNR nonviolent civil resistance actions have included acting with Christian Peace Witness - Iraq in September 2006, and a campaign around funding for the Iraq war with Kathy Kelly's Voices for Creative Nonviolence dubbed the Occupation Project in 2007.

NCNR has a close-knit organizing committee, and typically one convener to help facilitate organizing calls and speak for the network. NCNR's first convener was Gordon Clark. Other peace activists associated with NCNR are Eve Tetaz, Malachy Kilbride and Pete Perry.
