= Kathy Kelly =

American peace activist, pacifist and author

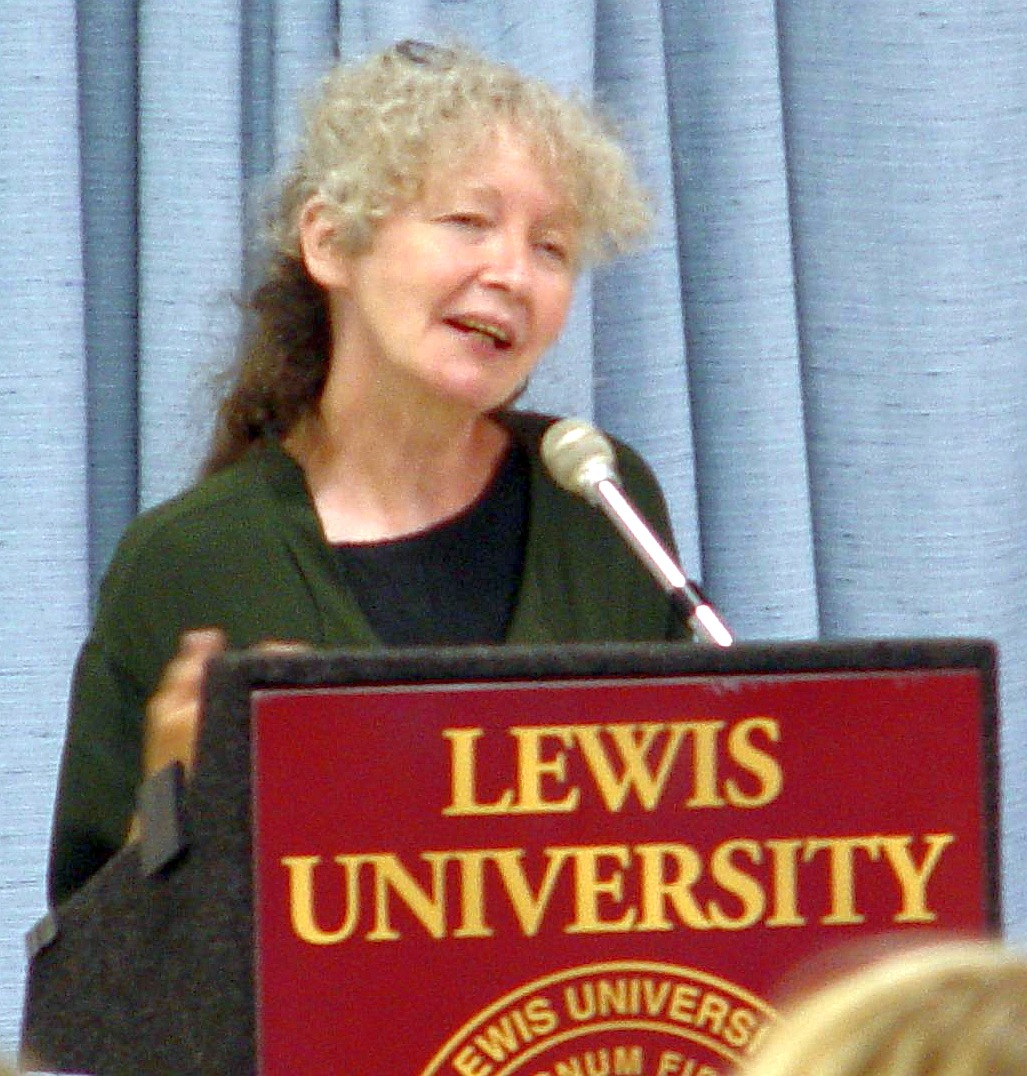
- Speaking at Lasallian Youth, 2008
- Born: December 10, 1952 (age 73); Chicago, Illinois, US
- Education: Loyola University Chicago
- Occupation: Peace activist
- Years active: 1978–present
- Spouses: Karl Meyer (m. 1982; div. 1994) Bob Alberts (m. 2022)

Kathy Kelly (born 1952) is an American peace activist, pacifist and author, one of the founding members of Voices in the Wilderness, and, until the campaign closed in 2020, a co-coordinator of Voices for Creative Nonviolence. As part of peace team work in several countries, she has traveled to Iraq twenty-six times, notably remaining in combat zones during the early days of both US–Iraq wars.

From 2009 to 2019, her activism and writing focused on Afghanistan, Yemen, and Gaza, along with domestic protests against US drone policy. She has been arrested more than sixty times at home and abroad, and written of her experiences among targets of US military bombardment and inmates of US prisons.

== Biography ==
=== Early life and education, 1953–1978 ===
Kelly was born in 1952 in Chicago's Garfield Ridge neighborhood to parents Frank and Catherine Kelly. She attended St. Paul-Kennedy "shared-time" high school, which split her days between a Catholic institution where she was given the writings of Daniel Berrigan and Martin Luther King Jr. to read alongside biblical texts, and a desegregating public school where interracial violence was common. She obtained her BA from Loyola University Chicago working a succession of night jobs to help cover tuition, including a stint on a meat-packing factory line which inspired her to become a lifelong vegetarian. During these years she remembers being deeply moved by Alain Resnais' Holocaust documentary Night and Fog, by a lecture by Vietnam War activist Tom Cornell, and by the activist scripture writings of William Stringfellow.

=== Poverty and peace activist, 1978–1996 ===
After college in 1978, and while working on her MA in Religious Education (at Chicago Theological Seminary,) Kelly began volunteer work in Chicago's Uptown neighborhood (where she still resides), working at a local soup kitchen with a circle of activists, including future SOAW founder Roy Bourgeois, centered around Chicago's Francis of Assisi House, a homeless shelter in the Catholic Worker tradition. In 1980 she began work as a teacher of religion at St. Ignatius College Preparatory School.

In 1982 she married fellow activist Karl Meyer and began a lifetime of "war tax resistance" (refusal to pay federal taxes on pacifist grounds), asking her employer to reduce her salary beneath the taxable income. A Jesuit professional development grant enabled her to travel to Nicaragua in 1985 and participate in a fast led by Foreign Minister Miguel D'Escoto against US-backed Contra activity. Returning to the US, she left St. Ignatius in 1986 in order to focus on activism including two years as a teacher in Uptown's Prologue High School serving marginalized low-income youth.

In August 1988, Kelly participated in the Missouri Peace Planting, trespassing at a nuclear missile silo near Kansas City, Missouri, to plant corn on it. For this action she served nine months in a Lexington, Kentucky, minimum security prison.

In 1990 she joined the Gulf Peace Team, a delegation assembled to protest the imminent Persian Gulf War and spent the first 14 days of the air war encamped on the Iraq-Saudi border before evacuation to Baghdad and then Amman in Jordan where she helped coordinate relief work.

Kelly helped organize and participated in several nonviolent direct action teams in war zones outside Iraq: Bosnia in December 1992 and August 1993, and Haiti in the summer of 1994. She and Meyer divorced in 1994 although they have continued as friends.

=== Voices in the Wilderness, 1996–2003 ===
In 1993, after her return from Bosnia, Kelly became a full-time caregiver to her father, assisted (until his death in 2000) by a network of former Iraq peace team members now living in and around her and her father's shared Uptown apartment. In late 1995 Kelly and several other of these activists resolved to form Voices in the Wilderness (VIW), a campaign to end the US/UN sanctions regime against Iraq. In a January 1996 letter, the activists wrote then US Attorney General Janet Reno a letter declaring an intention to travel to Iraq with food and medicine in violation of the sanctions. A return letter threatened the participants with separate 12-year prison sentences and fines of one million dollars each.

Between 1996 and 2003 Voices organized over seventy delegations to Iraq bringing food and medicine directly to Iraqi citizens in deliberate violation of both UN-imposed economic sanctions and US law. Participants refused to pay fines for these actions but instead solicited matching donations from supporters for supplies to distribute on repeat visits. Members sought to raise awareness at home with demonstrations, media appearances, and personal accounts of their delegation work. Kelly went on 26 of these delegations.

Voices work was chiefly focused on, but not exclusive to, Iraq: in April 2002 Kelly and her fellow activists, walking on foot and engaging in repeated negotiations with Israeli Defense Force officers, became the first internationals to visit the Jenin refugee camp after learning, while on peace team work in the West Bank, of the recent attack there and what she described as its heavy civilian toll after observing it first-hand during her time at West Bank.

In March 2003, Kelly returned to Baghdad shortly before the start of the Iraq War, witnessing the Shock and Awe bombardment, and remaining for two months. She narrated her experiences of bombardment for Westerners via antiwar and religious witness websites. When the air war gave way to a ground invasion, she and other activists were present to greet arriving US soldiers with dates and water.

In November of that same year Kelly joined 43 other activists crossing illegally into the Fort Benning US Army base as part of the annual School of the Americas Watch vigil, and incurred a three-month prison sentence which she carried out in Illinois' Pekin Prison in 2004, to which she was seen off by longtime friend Studs Terkel. Her experiences in prison resulted in many of the essays collected in her book Other Lands Have Dreams, published in 2005.

Voices in the Wilderness was fined $20,000 by the US Treasury in 2003, which it refused to pay; it was "charged with exporting unspecified goods or services, which a spokesman said was related to delivering medicines to Iraq several years ago." A judge affirmed the fine in late 2004. In 2005, Kelly announced that Voices in the Wilderness disbanded, and the group Voices for Creative Nonviolence was formed to continue challenging US military and economic warfare against Iraq and other countries.

=== Voices for Creative Nonviolence, 2005–2020 ===
With Voices for Creative Nonviolence, Kelly carried on extensive activism outside of Iraq, most recently focusing on solidarity work in Kabul alongside a community of Afghan peace activists, support for the protest movement against naval base construction on South Korea's Jeju Island, and multiple visits to Gaza, where Kelly waited out Israel's 2009 "Cast Lead" operation in a region of Gaza along its border with Egypt which was sustaining heavy bombardment. Among numerous fasts and peace walks, Kelly has joined protests at several domestic USAF drone bases, incurring a June 2014 arrest with charges threatening a six-month prison sentence.

Shortly after formation, VCNV began sending delegations, several involving Kelly, to interview Iraqi refugees in countries neighboring Iraq, especially Jordan. In the summer of 2006, Kelly and other Voices activists traveled to Lebanon during the 2006 Lebanon War between Israel and Hezbollah, reporting from the capital city of Beirut and then, once the cease-fire was declared, from damaged villages in the country's south.

In 2007 VCNV initiated the "Occupation Project", in which activists in 25 states occupied the offices of 39 Senators and congressional Representatives whom they regarded as insufficiently committed to defunding the Iraq war. In the campaign's first ten weeks participants incurred 320 arrests. In the 2008 presidential campaign season, a corresponding campaign targeted candidates' offices, and included "Witness Against War," a march from Chicago to the 2008 Republican National Convention in Saint Paul, Minnesota.

In January 2009, Kelly had helped organize "Camp Hope: Countdown to Change," a 19-day winter vigil two blocks from the Chicago home of then-President-Elect Barack Obama, but she spent most of the length of the vigil in Egypt and in the Gaza Strip, witnessing Israel's 22-day Operation Cast Lead assault on the region, living with a Gazan family in a neighborhood skirting the area under heaviest bombardment.

In April 2009, working with the Nevada Desert Experience, Kelly and fourteen others (including Louie Vitale, Stephen Kelly, Eve Tetaz, and John Dear), entered Creech Air Force Base to distribute leaflets protesting drone attacks in Pakistan piloted remotely from the base. They were arrested and charged with criminal trespass, for which they were sentenced to "time served" in a January 2011 ruling. The judge in the case had taken a 4-month recess to consider their claim to have entered the base in order to prevent a crime.

In May and June 2009, Kelly traveled to Pakistan with a small VCNV delegation, including activist Gene Stoltzfus, that met with organizations and families in Islamabad, Rawalpindi, Shah Mansour, Tarbella, and Lahore, reporting back with essays.

As documented in a 2012 Al Jazeera documentary, in January 2010 Kelly was arrested in the rotunda of the US Capitol building while taking part in a mock funeral, organized by Witness Against Torture, remembering Mani al-Utaybi, Yasser al-Zahrani, and Ali Abdullah Ahmed, three men then recently alleged to have been tortured to death in the US Guantanamo Bay prison complex. All participants of the protest were acquitted in court the following June.

In May 2010 Kelly made another Pakistan trip alongside activists Simon Harak and Josh Brollier. They met with families in the Swat Valley, Peshawar and Shah Mansur, as well as spending time in Rawalpindi, Islamabad, and Lahore. As part of this trip Kelly and Brollier travelled in Afghanistan as guests of the EMERGENCY, visiting Panjshir and First Aid Posts on the outskirts of Panjshir, Kabul, and Bagram (site of the Bagram Air Force Base). The stated intention of the trip was "learning more about conditions faced by ordinary people in Afghanistan".

Kelly made two other visits to Afghanistan in 2010, working closely with Bamiyan province's Afghan Youth Peace Volunteers. In October and November 2010 she visited the Afghan youths for one week in their home province before spending several weeks in Kabul, where she met with refugees from Helmand province and representatives of several NGOs, and wrote reports on her experience.

In December 2010, Kelly and six other Voices activists met with Afghan Youth Peace Volunteers in Kabul to assist them in a brief activist campaign; the Afghan youth issued a "People's December Review" to counter President Barack Obama's December Review of the Afghan war, they began hosting monthly international call-in days using the Skype internet phone service, and they conducted interviews, not only with NGO aid workers involved in the Oxfam America-authored "Nowhere to Turn" report, but with US Professor Noam Chomsky (via a Skype connection), and (separately) with current and former Afghan parliamentarians Ramazan Bashardost and Malalai Joya. Kelly's delegation helped them post internet transcripts of most of these events on their website.

Kelly returned with Voices to Afghanistan in March and early April 2011.

On April 22, 2011, Kelly was among 37 protesters arrested in Syracuse, New York, at Hancock Field Air National Guard Base in a protest against drone warfare organized by the Upstate NY Coalition to Ground the Drones and End the Wars.

Kelly spent June 22 – July 9 in Athens, Greece, as a passenger (along with retired colonel Ann Wright, "The Color Purple" author Alice Walker, and retired CIA analyst Ray McGovern) on The Audacity of Hope, the US boat in Freedom Flotilla II, a campaign to sail to Gaza from international waters in defiance of the Israeli naval blockade. The Greek government refused to allow the ship to sail, based first on a third-party complaint concerning the ship's seaworthiness, and then in an open policy of opposition to the flotilla. The ship attempted to sail for international waters but was intercepted by armed coast guard vessels and impounded. Kelly stayed a week in solidarity with the arrested Greek captain until bail could be arranged, then attempted to reach Gaza by plane in the "Flytilla", but was denied entry to Israel and returned to Greece.

In late December 2011 Kelly and two other international activists returned to a working-class Kabul neighborhood to live alongside members of the Afghan Youth Peace Volunteers, whom she then helped escort on a brief January delegation to Bhopal in India. They would return to Gujarat the following year. She returned unexpectedly to Kabul for one week in February 2012 after having been denied a visa to enter Bahrain with the February 14th delegation of Witness Bahrain activists seeking to support demonstrations on the one-year anniversary of that country's suppressed Arab Spring uprising.

Kelly arranged travel to Gaza in hurried response to Israel's November 2012 "Pillar of Defense" bombardment, arriving one day after a ceasefire and spending the following two weeks visiting bombing sites and interviewing survivors.

In 2012 Kelly helped initiate the Afghan Peace Volunteers' "Duvet Project", using foreign donations to produce duvet comforters for free distribution to Afghans in the winter months. From 2012 through 2020, Kabul seamstresses were employed to eventually produce some 2,000 duvets the first winter and 3,000 the second, with ensuing seasons of the project work still underway. In visits over these years, Kelly also helped form the APV's women's community. Kelly continues in regular visits to Kabul.

In April 2014 Kelly was arrested protesting drone piloting at Beale Air Force Base in California.

In May 2014 Kelly travelled to Jeju Island in South Korea to join in local protests against a naval base being built on the island for use by the United States. Protests focused on threatened environmental and cultural damage, and also the undesirability for the region of an announced "Asia Pivot" in US military strategy.

In June 2014 Kelly and another activist entered Whiteman Air Force Base approaching base guards with a loaf of bread and a letter indicting drone warfare, requesting to meet with the base commander. She stood trial for trespassing in December 2014 and in late February 2015 began serving a three-month sentence at the "FMC Lexington" federal prison in Kentucky, her fourth stay in a US federal prison.

In August 2015 Kelly helped organize and joined a 90-mile walk through Wisconsin linking increasingly militarized, racially targeted police violence inside the US with ongoing US drone assassinations of high-risk civilians, their neighbors and families, in multiple Middle Eastern and North African countries.

In June 2016, Kelly traveled to five cities in the Russian Federation seeking to build activist connections opposing a revitalized cold war, and to report Russian perspectives on increasing NATO military buildup along the country's borders.

In January 2017 Kelly was convicted of trespass for having obstructed transit at an April 2016 Black Lives Matter demonstration protesting the Minnesota police's shooting of Jamar Clark.

In April, 2017, Kelly helped organize and then participated in a 6-day fast across from United Nations headquarters in New York, called "A Fast for Yemen Because Yemen Is Starving."

In 2017 she visited Qatar at the QLC (Qatar Leadership Conference), a youth conference held in Doha. The 2019 onset of the COVID-19 pandemic saw Kelly interrupting regular journeys to Kabul.

From 2012 through 2018 Kelly accompanied Voices on peace walks, in 2012 from Madison, Wisconsin, to a NATO summit in Chicago, in 2013 from Rock Island to Des Moines Air National Guard base, in 2014 from Chicago to the Air National Guard base at Battle Creek, Michigan, and in 2018 from Savannah, Georgia to Georgia's Kings Bay Naval Base in support of the Kings Bay Plowshares 7.

At the end of 2020 the Voices for Creative Nonviolence campaign, citing a shift away from foreign travel, ended.

=== 2021–present ===
After the end of the Voices campaign, Kelly refocused on work with several other groups, continuing her co-coordination of the "Ban Killer Drones" campaign and of "World BEYOND War" of which she became board president in 2022. With co-coordinators Nick Mottern and Brad Wolf, she helped organize the "Merchants of Death War Crimes Tribunal" which officially launched on November 23, 2023. Since the end of the U.S. invasion of Afghanistan, Kelly has helped lead an ad-hoc group organizing assistance for young Afghans met during her and her fellow activists' travels.

=== Author and speaker ===
Kelly has reported on her time on peace teams and in prison in numerous articles for peace and religious journals, and for websites such as CounterPunch and CommonDreams.org. Several of her essays have appeared in books on the Iraq War. In 2005 she authored "Other Lands Have Dreams: From Baghdad to Pekin Prison" (CounterPunch), collecting and expanding on her letters from Iraq and from prison. She is co-author of "Prisoners on Purpose: a Peacemakers Guide to Jails and Prison". (Progressive Foundation:1989), and co-editor of "War and Peace in the Gulf" (Spokesman:2001). She spends much of her time touring the country on speaking engagements for schools, churches, festivals, and activist groups from whom she accepts but does not require a stipend. Associates have commented in interviews on her heavy work and travel schedule, noting in one instance that "Jail is the only place she can rest". Her latest articles have focused on the experiences of Afghan and Yemeni people facing consequences of US military and economic warfare.

== Education ==
- B.A. Loyola University at Chicago 1974
- Masters in Religious Education, Chicago Theological Seminary; part of a consortium of schools which included the Jesuit School of Theology at Chicago where Kelly took courses each quarter

== Awards and nominations ==
- Pax Christi USA Teacher of Peace Award. 1998
- Newberry Library Free Speech Award. 1998
- Detroit City Council Testimonial Resolution commending humanitarian efforts. February 1999
- Robert O. Cooper Fellowship in Peace and Justice Award, Southern Methodist University. March 1999
- University of the Incarnate Word Distinguished Speaker Award. March 1999
- California State Assembly Certificate of Recognition for Founding of Voices in the Wilderness. November 1999
- The Peace Abbey Courage of Conscience Award for her extraordinary commitment to befriend the Iraqi people and bring to light their great suffering under the immoral UN/US economic sanctions. 1999
- Consortium on Peace Research and Development Social Courage Award. 1999
- Dan Berrigan Award, DePaul University. 1999
- Office of the Americas Peace and Justice Award November. 1999
- International Fellowship of Reconciliation Pfeffer Peace Prize. February 2000
- Arab American Anti Discrimination Committee Humanitarian Award. June 2000
- Chaldean Iraqi American Association of Michigan Appreciation Award for Dedication in Lifting Sanctions Against Iraq. July 2001
- Newberry Library "1st place" orator – Bughouse Square Debates. August 2001
- Life for Relief and Development Humanitarian Services Award. September 2001
- 'special recognition' as a Woman of Peace at the Global Exchange Human Rights Awards in San Francisco with Bianca Jagger, Barbara Lee and Arundhati Roy. May 2003
- Archbishop Oscar Romero Award, Mercyhurst College. March 2003
- Call to Action Leadership Award, with Voices in the Wilderness 2003
- Thomas Merton Center Award, Pittsburgh, PA. 2003
- Adela Dwyer St. Thomas of Villanova Peace Award, Villanova University, Voices in the Wilderness. 2003
- William Scarlett Award from The Witness, Voices in the Wilderness. 2003
- Association of Chicago Priests, Joseph Cardinal Bernardin Common Ground Award with Voices in the Wilderness. 2004
- First Annual Award for Justice on behalf of the Religious Orders Partnership given to Kathy Kelly and Voices in the Wilderness
- Cranbrook Peace Foundation Annual Peace Award. 2004
- Houston Peace and Justice Center National Peacemaker Award
- Peace Seeker of the Year 2005, Montana Peace Seekers Network
- Doctor of Theology honoris causa from Chicago Theological Seminary awarded. May 14, 2005
- Honorary degree awarded from Lewis University. May 15, 2005
- Elliott Black Award for 2006 awarded by the American Ethical Union
- De Paul Center for Church/State Studies 2007 John Courtney Murray Award. April 2007
- Bradford-O'Neill Medallion for Social Justice Recipient, Dominican University. September 2007
- The Oscar Romero Award presented by Pax Christi Maine. October 2007
- The War Resisters League (WRL) 2010 Peace Award, presented by WRL. May 2, 2010
- The Chomsky Award of the Justice Studies Association. 2011
- Evanston Friends Meeting Peace Award, 2013
- Community church of Boston Sacco & Vanzetti Award for Social Justice, May 2015
- Pax Christi Southern California Ambassador of Peace Award, June 2015
- Gandhi Peace Award, Promoting Enduring Peace, October 2015
- 2015 The US Peace Prize by the US Peace Memorial Foundation "for inspiring nonviolence and risking her own life and freedom for peace and the victims of war."
- 2017 Veterans For Peace Gandhian Non-Violence Award – co-recipient with John Heuer

== Quotes ==
From Baghdad on March 19, 2003 – "I suppose I'm more prepared than most of my companions for the grueling roar of warplanes, the thuds that threaten eardrums, the noise of antiaircraft and exploding 'massive ordnance.' Compared to average Iraqis my age, I've tasted only a small portion of war, but I'm not a complete stranger ... I feel passionately prepared to insist that war is never an answer. But nothing can prepare me or anyone else for what we could possibly say to the children who will suffer in the days and nights ahead. What can you say to a child who is traumatized, or maimed, or orphaned, or dying? Perhaps only the words we've murmured over and over at the bedsides of dying children in Iraqi hospitals. 'I'm sorry. I'm so very sorry.'"

"One way to stop the next war is to continue to tell the truth about this one".

"One of the most important 'Spiritual Directors' in my life has been the Internal Revenue Service ... finding ways to live without owning property, relying on savings, or growing attached to a job ... Becoming a war tax refuser was one of the simplest decisions I've ever made".

"I want to be in touch with the people caught in a war at home. The war against the poor".

== Bibliography, editing, and contributions ==
- Kelly, Kathy (2005). Other Lands Have Dreams: from Baghdad to Pekin Prison. Counterpunch Press. ISBN 1-904859-28-3.
- Kelly, Kathy. "Raising Voices: The Children of Iraq, 1990–1999" in Arnove, Anthony (ed.) (2000). Iraq Under Siege: The Deadly Impact of Sanctions and War, South End Press.
- "Writings by Kathy Kelly". Voices for Creative Non-Violence (category search).
- Bhatia, Bela; Drèze, Jean; Kelly, Kathy, eds. (2001). War and peace in the Gulf: testimonies of the Gulf Peace Team. Spokesman Books.
- Kelly, Kathy. "Searching for the truth in Jenin" in Nancy Stohlman, Nancy; Aladin, Laurieann eds. (2003). Live from Palestine South End Press. pp. 137–141.
- Kelly, Kathy (June 2, 2006). Right Livelihood. Common Dreams.
- Kelly, Kathy (May 20, 2006). Eve of Departure. Common Dreams.
- Kelly, Kathy (May 28, 2006). Enduring Memories. Common Dreams.
- Kelly, Kathy. "Foreword" in Smith-Ferri, David (2011). With Children Like Your Own: Iraq and Afghanistan Poems, 2008–2011. Haleys. ISBN 978-1-884540-28-8
- Contributor to Guttman, Marc (ed.) "Why Peace" 2012. ISBN 978-0984980208
- Contributor to Vincent, Rachel (ed.) "When We Are Bold: Women Who Turn Our Upsidedown World Right", Art and Literature Mapalé Publishing, 2016. ISBN 978-0994944160
- Contributor to Amidon, John, Aumand, Maureen, Breyman, Steve(eds.) "Bending the Arc", SUNY Press, 2020. ISBN 978-1438478746

== See also ==
- List of peace activists
