= Nevada Desert Experience =

Movement

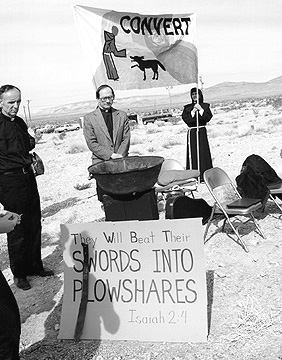
Members of Nevada Desert Experience hold a prayer vigil during the Easter period of 1982 at the entrance to the Nevada Test Site.

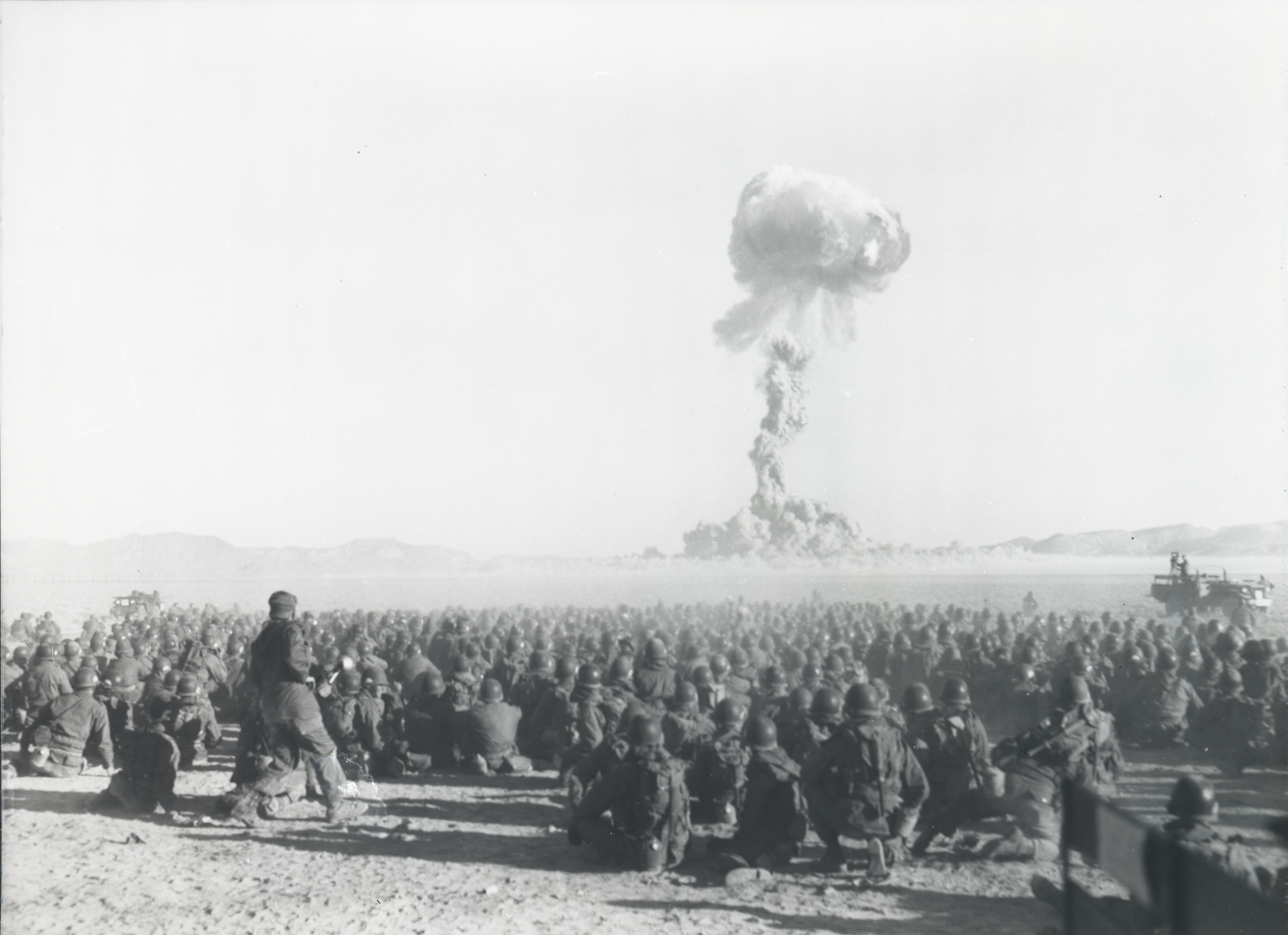
November 1951 nuclear test at Nevada Test Site

Nevada Desert Experience is a name for the movement to stop U.S. nuclear weapons testing that came into use in the middle 1980s. It is also the name of an anti-nuclear organization which continues to create public events to question the morality and intelligence of the U.S. nuclear weapons program, with a main focus on the United States Department of Energy's (DOE) Nevada National Security Site (formerly called the Nevada Test Site or the Nevada Proving Ground).

== History ==
In the spring of 1982, activists working for social justice, environmental preservation, and international peace organized a six-week peace vigil at the entrance to the Nevada Test Site, about 60 miles (100 km) from Las Vegas, Nevada. In 1983, they repeated the vigil, calling it the Lenten Desert Experience. This anarchist group of Christian organizers decided that the program had been successful enough to start an organization, which has been a conscientiously interfaith aspect of the nuclear weapons abolition movement. They named it Nevada Desert Experience, or NDE, because of the work within the prayer-actions for peace that included learning to appreciate the Mojave and the Great Basin Deserts of North America. Organizers (primarily ethnically non-Indigenous) believed that appreciation of the beauty and power of the natural environment, coupled with a universal code of ethics (the Golden Rule) organically leads humans to make a stand for peace and environmental justice. In 1989, NDE organizers founded Pace e Bene to amplify the movement for peacemaking beyond the aspect of a global existential threat of nuclear weapons. The first ten years of NDE were the most synergistic and spiritually revolutionary for North American Peace Activists. In the early 21st century, the annual events of NevadaDesertExperience.org leaned more on "desert spirituality" (less Christocentric as in the 20th century) and expanded to resist robotic (weaponized drones) warfare.

== Aims ==
The movement's immediate goal of ending nuclear testing at the Nevada Test Site was met in 1992, when President George H. W. Bush signed a moratorium on underground nuclear weapons tests. The abolition movement, led by NDE and the Western Shoshone-based Shundahai Network were sparked back into action with the renewal of non-nuclear (yet still radioactive) explosions at the Nevada Test Site in 1997. These "subcritical" bombs use fissile materials which do not reach the self-sustaining chain reaction of a typical nuclear bomb. The bombs are designed by Los Alamos National Laboratory and Lawrence Livermore Laboratory, whereby the data collected can be fed to computers to simulate full-scale nuclear explosions for the US National Security Agency (NSA) and DOE. Their explosive yield is low, and small amounts of radiation may be released. Because each sub-critical experiment costs roughly US$20 million and much time from the humans working within the nuclear weapons management industry, the tests indicate a strong continued U.S. Government interest in favor of nuclear weapons. As a spiritually active movement, NDE seeks peace and nonviolence. The founders of NDE sought to use the activist tactics of Jesus Christ and quickly expanded ecumenically and inter-faithfully. Therefore, NDE continues to work for deep ecological sensitivities and social peacemaking, with one goal being to clean up and contain the contamination created by nearly 80 years of nuclear testing in Nevada and Western Shoshone country.

=== Protests in Nye County ===
From 1986 through 1994, two years after the United States put a hold on full-scale nuclear weapons testing, 536 demonstrations were held at the Nevada Test Site involving 37,488 participants and 15,740 arrests, according to government records. In the fall of 1986, the Peace Caucus of the American Public Health Association (APHA) organized a protest at the site with over 500 APHA members participating. Over 100 APHA members, along with Carl Sagan, Victor R. Sidel and H. Jack Geiger, were arrested. In January, 1987, the actor Martin Sheen and 71 other anti-nuclear protesters were arrested at the Nevada Test Site in a demonstration marking the 36th anniversary of the first nuclear test there. On February 5, 1987, more than 400 people were arrested, when they tried to enter the nation's nuclear proving grounds after nearly 2,000 demonstrators held a rally to protest nuclear weapons testing. Those arrested included the astronomer Carl Sagan, privacy advocate Phil Zimmermann, and the actors Kris Kristofferson, Martin Sheen, and Robert Blake. Five Democratic members of Congress attended the rally: Thomas J. Downey, Mike Lowry, Jim Bates, Leon E. Panetta and Barbara Boxer. In April 2007 Martin Sheen among others was arrested.

==== Protests in Clark County against weaponized drones at Creech Air Force Base ====
In protest over UAV attacks in Pakistan and the perceived extremely high danger of harming civilians, in an event sponsored by Nevada Desert Experience, Friar Louis Vitale, Kathy Kelly, Stephen Kelly SJ, John Dear, and others were arrested outside Creech Air Force Base (adjacent to the Nevada National Security Site) on Wednesday April 9, 2009. Subsequent monthly protests have been ongoing and conducted by a number of organizations including Code Pink.

== See also ==
- Megan Rice - former employee of NDE
- Louie Vitale - cofounder, former NDE council member, advisory group member
- Thomas Gumbleton - former NDE council member
- Rosemary Lynch - cofounder
- Martin Sheen - former NDE council member
- Alan Senauke - former NDE council member
- Corbin Harney
- Hibakusha
- List of nuclear tests
- International Day against Nuclear Tests
- The Ribbon International
- Nevada Semipalatinsk led by Olzhas Suleimenov in Kazakhstan.
