= Stoltzfus =

Stoltzfus is a surname of German origin. It is common among the Amish. Most American Stoltzfuses are descended from Nicholas Stoltzfus (1719–1774), an Amish man who migrated from Germany to America in 1766.

== Notable people ==
Notable people with this surname include:

- Gene Stoltzfus (1940–2010), American peace activist
- J. Lowell Stoltzfus (born 1949), American politician
- Kate Stoltzfus (born 1991), American model
- Nathan Stoltzfus (born 1954), American historian
- William Stoltzfus (1924-2015), American diplomat
- Elam Stoltzfus (born 1957), American documentary filmmaker
- Dustin Stoltzfus (born 1991), American mixed martial artist
