= Fintan Kilbride =

- Born: 18 March 1927; Bray, County Wicklow, Ireland
- Died: 21 December 2006 (aged 79); Toronto, Ontario, Canada
- Spouse: Kenise Murphy Kilbride
- Children: Siobhan Kilbride; Ciara Kilbride Amaral

Fintan Kilbride (18 March 1927 – 21 December 2006) was a Catholic priest and teacher committed to the poor.

== Biography ==
=== Early life and missionary work ===
Fintan was born in Bray, County Wicklow, Ireland. He grew up in Clonmel, County Tipperary. He was the son of Bernard Joseph Kilbride and Anne Ledwith Kilbride and the brother of Brian, Nuala, Dympna, Aidan, Louise, Kevin, and Malachy. He is also the uncle of Malachy Kilbride the peace activist. He joined the Holy Ghost Fathers and served as a missionary in Nigeria, where he taught in high schools, helped build a hospital and three schools, and founded a teacher's college in Nigeria. He was expelled from Biafra in 1970.

=== Marriage and children ===
He married Kenise Murphy Kilbride in 1973. The couple had two children, Siobhan Kilbride and Ciara Kilbride Amaral (married to Nelson Amaral). He became a grandfather in 2004 when the first of his three grandchildren: Declan Amaral was born. Rhianne Amaral was born in 2006, and Ronan Amaral was born in 2010.

=== Career ===
After Nigeria, Kilbride settled in Toronto, Ontario, Canada. He taught English at Neil McNeil Catholic Secondary School from 1975 to 1992. He was active in social justice causes, co-founding the Ecumenical Good Friday Walk in 1979, and created Students Crossing Borders in 1991, a program that introduced youth to the realities of living and working in less developed countries, and to the responsibilities that privilege brings. He served on the board of directors of Free The Children.

=== Death and afterward ===
Peacefully with his wife Kenise Murphy Kilbride, Fintan died 21 December 2006.

== Awards ==
- 2005: Marion Tyrrell Award of Merit, Ontario English Catholic Teachers' Association
- 2005: Lewis Perinbam Award, World University Service of Canada
