= Eve Tetaz =

American activist (1931–2023)

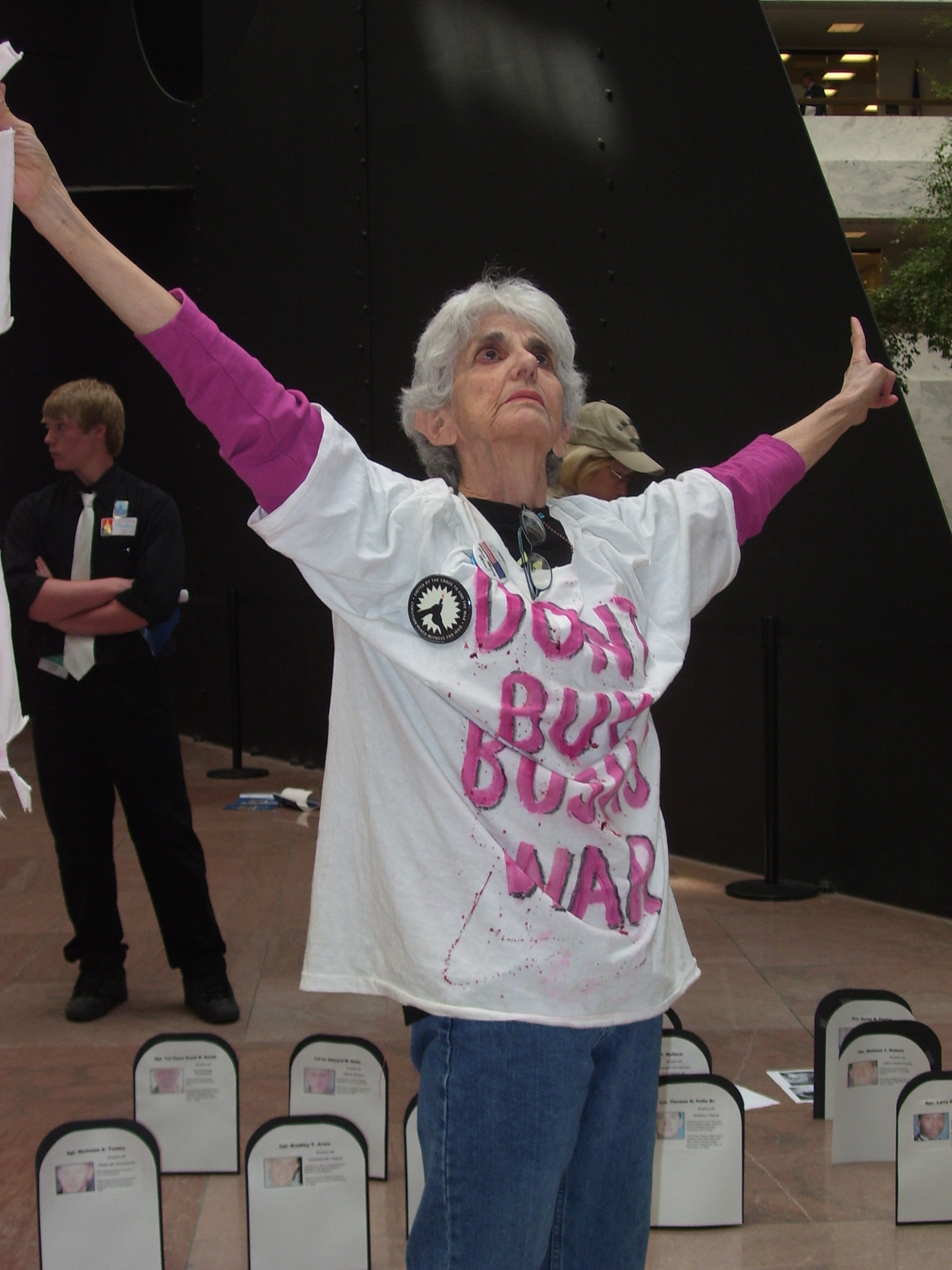
Tetaz at an anti-war protest in March 2007 (photo by Lori Perdue)

Eve Leona Tetaz (née Birnbaum; September 6, 1931 – June 7, 2023) was an American public school teacher and peace and justice activist from Washington, D.C. She was arrested 11 times in 2007 for nonviolent civil resistance during protests against the war and occupation of Iraq. Tetaz was arrested approximately a dozen times between 2008 and early 2010.

Tetaz was involved with several peace and justice groups, such as Code Pink, National Campaign for Nonviolent Resistance and Witness Against Torture.

Tetaz died on June 7, 2023, at the age of 91.

== Sentences and appeals ==
=== Iraq War protests ===
Tetaz was one of 16 anti-torture protesters who were arrested for a protest on October 17, 2006, in front of the White House. The arrests occurred the same day President George W. Bush signed into law the Military Commissions Act of 2006.

On November 2, 2007, Tetaz was sentenced to seven days in the D.C. Jail after pleading no contest to two counts of failure to obey a lawful order and one count of unlawful assembly incommoding. In her sentencing statement, she said she would continue to speak out against the war and occupation of Iraq.

Tetaz continued to engage in nonviolent direct action in 2008, including the January 11th "Shut Down Guantanamo Day" action at the U.S. Supreme Court. On that day 82 activists were arrested inside and outside of the Supreme Court, demanding that the U.S. government close the Guantanamo prison and immediately bring all prisoners before a court of law.

In another nonviolent direct action, a week before the fifth anniversary of the invasion of Iraq, Tetaz and 9 others spoke out from the Senate gallery while the legislative body was in session. They represented ghosts of individuals killed in the war and military occupation, and called on the Senate to cease its funding. They were charged with Disrupting Congress.

On April 9, 2009, Tetaz joined 13 other peace activists, including Kathy Kelly with Voices for Creative Nonviolence and Louie Vitale of Pace Bene, in protesting the military's use of unmanned drone bombers. The group was arrested at Creech U.S. Air Force Base in Nevada as they attempted to meet with personnel who operate the drone bombers.

In March 2010, following Tetaz's second-longest jail sentence to date, she explained her personal beliefs and why she would continue to protest against war and "crimes against the entire human family" in a letter to the editor of The Washington Post.

=== Other trials and sentences ===
In November 2007, Tetaz completed approximately a week in jail for a number of nonviolent protests earlier in the year. This included a Mother's Day march from the White House to Capitol Hill, which featured anti-war activist and Gold Star mother, Cindy Sheehan.

At the end of May 2008, Eve was sentenced to five days in D.C. Jail after being found guilty by Judge Wendell Gardner of breaking the law on January 11 of the same year. She also received unsupervised probation and a stay away order from the Supreme Court for a year.

On April 2, 2009, there were oral arguments before the D.C. Court of Appeals regarding Eve's September 2006 arrest in case no. 07-CT-140+, Eve L. Tetaz, et al. v. District of Columbia. The oral argument was available for video internet streaming.

In October 2009, Tetaz was on trial with co-defendants Ellen Barfield, Steve Mihalis, and Pete Perry. The four peace and justice activists were charged with Disruption of Congress after protesting during a Senate Foreign Relations Committee hearing. On January 25, 2010, Tetaz was sentenced by Judge Lynn Leibovitz to 25 days in jail after being convicted in the trial related to the Senate Foreign Relations hearing action.

On June 27, 2012, Tetaz was found guilty of violating 40 USC 6135 for holding a banner on the grounds of the US Supreme Court on the 35th Anniversary of Gary Gilmore's execution, January 17, 2012. Tetaz was initially sentenced to a $350 fine, a 3-year probationary term and stay-away from the US Supreme Court, and a 30-day sentence, all suspended but 15 days. Tetaz stated that she would not pay the fine or agree to be on probation, so Judge Juliet McKenna sentenced Tetaz to 60 days in DC Jail - the maximum statutory sentence allowed.

Tetaz continued her nonviolent protests against war with a growing focus on the U.S government's use of armed military drones. On April 28, 2013, she was arrested with 30 others at the Hancock Air Base near Syracuse, New York. She was acquitted by Judge David Gideon on September 15, 2014, when he granted Tetaz's motion for dismissal due to insufficient evidence.

== See also ==
- List of peace activists
