= Rosemary Lynch =

Catholic nun and anti war activist

Sister Rosemary Lynch was born on March 18, 1917, in Phoenix, Arizona, and attended St. Mary’s parish schools in Phoenix. She continued with Franciscan influence and joined the Sisters of St. Francis of Penance and Christian Charity in 1932, later affirming her vows in 1934. The early years of her work consisted of teaching in a secondary school in Los Angeles, and later, in 1952, she became a principal for a school in Montana. She knew eight languages.

In 1960, she was elected to the central administration of the Franciscan sisters. During her years in Rome as a congregation representative, she helped in the Second Vatican Council. During this period, she traveled to Indonesia, Mexico, and Africa. She later mentioned that those experiences pushed her to attempt nonviolent social change. So when she returned to the United States in 1977, she joined a new community in Las Vegas by other Franciscan groups, and co-founded the Nevada Desert Experience and Pace e Bene Nonviolence Service. One of her protests was the first “Lenten Desert Experience” in Nevada.

Sister Rosemary Lynch died on January 9, 2011, after suffering several injuries from a car crash while walking with Sister Klaryta Antoszewska. She continued her work right up to her death while not as a staff position but as a “Pace e Bene Elder".
