= Gene Stoltzfus =

American peace activist and international development worker

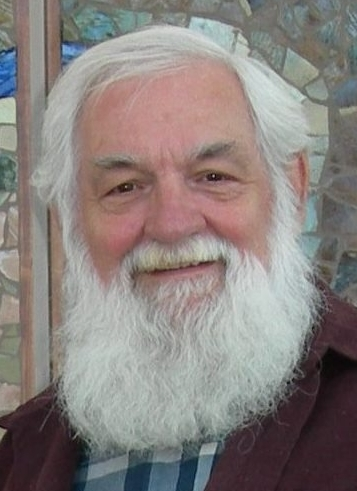
Gene Stoltzfus (October 19, 2008).

Mervin Eugene "Gene" Stoltzfus (February 1, 1940 – March 10, 2010) was an American peace activist, international development worker, founding director of Christian Peacemaker Teams (CPT), and pioneer in the international peace team movement. Drawing upon his Mennonite roots in pacifism and conscientious objection, Stoltzfus played a critical role in the anti-war movement among American aid workers in Vietnam in the 1960s, and helped shape diverse efforts of the global peace and justice community over the next forty years. As long-time director of CPT, he developed a practical vision of international justice-making through the use of grassroots faith-based peace teams, trained in the discipline of nonviolent direct action.

== Biography ==
=== Early life, 1940–1962 ===
Stoltzfus was born in Aurora, Ohio, in 1940 to Elmer and Orpha (Beechy) Stoltzfus. His father was a farmer, pastor, and area bishop in the Mennonite Church. Stoltzfus attended Eastern Mennonite High School, serving as senior class president, and Goshen College, graduating in 1962 with a B.A. in sociology. He first became attuned to issues of social inequality, he recalled, while working with migrant laborers at a poultry processing plant in Goshen, IN.

=== International Voluntary Services, Vietnam, 1963–1967 ===
After college Stoltzfus served for four years in Vietnam with International Voluntary Services (IVS), an organization specializing in agricultural development, hamlet education, and community organizing. As the Vietnam War ground on, Stoltzfus's circle of colleagues became increasingly uncomfortable with the role of Western aid organizations and with the violent deaths of IVSers such as Peter Hunting. Stoltzfus and several colleagues dramatized their frustration by destroying their privileged "PX" cards used for purchasing goods from defense department-operated stores, and voting down IVS acceptance of an offer for generous development funding from the Asia Foundation (subsequently exposed in the US media in 1967 as a front organization for the CIA).

Stoltzfus submitted his resignation from IVS in September, 1967, followed by three senior (and eight additional junior) IVS colleagues, including country director Don Luce. The four released a public letter to Lyndon B. Johnson, cosigned by 49 IVS staffers and volunteers, declaring the war "an overwhelming atrocity" which undermined IVS's humanitarian work. The action, being the first public anti-war protest by the American community in Vietnam, was covered on the front page of the New York Times.

=== Setting down activist roots, 1968–1980 ===
After resigning from IVS, Stoltzfus spoke of his Vietnam experiences to audiences across Australia, New Zealand, and North America. He participated in protests at the 1968 Democratic National Convention in Chicago, and worked from 1967 to 1972 on legislative issues in Washington, D.C. Employed for a time with the United Methodist Church, he worked to expose the existence of tiger cages at Côn Sơn Island prison, and later provided leadership for the Indochina Mobile Education Project, a photo exhibit which appeared in hundreds of public spaces across the country.

Returning to his Mennonite roots, Stoltzfus completed his M.Div. in 1973 at Anabaptist Mennonite Biblical Seminary in Elkhart, IN, and worked in Newton, KS the following three years as director of Mennonite Voluntary Service. He served as a staffer on a U.S. congressional delegation to Vietnam in early 1975, helping to arrange for Bella Abzug, Pete McCloskey, and others to meet with Vietnamese civilians who had been directly affected by the war. Congress subsequently refused additional funding for the war effort, effectively ending the US military presence in Vietnam.

In 1975 Stoltzfus married Dorothy Friesen, whom he had met in seminary, and the two became Mennonite Central Committee country co-directors in the Philippines from 1977 to 1979. During the time of martial law under the Ferdinand Marcos regime, they worked on a variety of grassroots human rights projects, such as an organizing effort among the T'boli to resist the building in their tribal area of a dam funded by the Asian Development Bank, and a study of the local effects of the multinational fruit company Castle & Cooke, Inc.

=== Chicago: Urban Life Center and Synapses, 1981–1987 ===
In 1981 Stoltzfus became director of the Urban Life Center (now the Chicago Center for Urban Life and Culture), an experiential and urban immersion study program for students from Midwestern colleges. Friesen served as director for Synapses, a human rights and international solidarity organization they started and operated out of a house in the Pilsen neighborhood. The couple committed themselves to living on an income below the taxable level in order to avoid paying war taxes, and emerged as leaders in the Chicago Pledge of Resistance network, which designed creative street theater and civil disobedience actions to protest US involvement in the wars in Central America. In 1988, for example, Stoltzfus was arrested, along with activist Kathy Kelly and 11 others, for singing Central America-theme Christmas carols in the shopping mall area of Chicago's Water Tower Place.

Stoltzfus continued to travel internationally, serving on a delegation to Nicaragua that resulted in the formation in 1983 of Witness for Peace, and returning to the Philippines to be present on the streets of Manila during the People Power Revolution of 1986. He served for a brief time as interim director of American Friends Service Committee.

=== Director, Christian Peacemaker Teams, 1988–2004 ===
Gene Stoltzfus on a Christian Peacemaker Teams delegation in Najaf, Iraq (August 20, 2003).

In 1988 Stoltzfus became the first director of CPT, an organization initiated by historic peace churches to place volunteers trained in nonviolent action in conflict zones around the world. Stoltzfus developed a rigorous training program, established a volunteer pool made up of full-time "corps" members and part-time "reservists," and sought out international partners who were developing the use of nonviolent tactics to reduce levels of violence, militarism, and structural injustice in their communities. Over the next 17 years, Stoltzfus established projects in Haiti during the time of the US-backed coup over Jean-Bertrand Aristide, in the West Bank city of Hebron beginning in 1995 after the Ibrahimi Mosque Massacre, in Chiapas after the Acteal Massacre of 1997, in Colombia accompanying displaced peoples, in Iraq prior to the 2003 US invasion, and at various locations in North America, especially partnering with indigenous peoples.

In 1990, as the Gulf War was gearing up, Stoltzfus co-led a delegation to Iraq which, along with similar efforts by Muhammad Ali, resulted in the release of 14 Western hostages. In a trip to Iraq after the US invasion in 2003, Stoltzfus interviewed family members of Iraqi detainees outside of the Abu Ghraib prison in Baghdad. In 2003–04, CPT carried out critical background and deposition work, cited by Seymour Hersh in The New Yorker, to expose Abu Ghraib torture and prisoner abuse.

=== Retirement years, 2004–2010 ===
Stoltzfus retired to Fort Frances, ON in 2004, learning to make twig furniture and natural jewelry, and writing regularly for his online blog, Peace Probe. He went on numerous speaking tours, including trips to Japan and Europe, and a Wheels of Justice bus tour throughout the Midwest. He helped lead a series of "Shine the Light" protests at US government facilities in Washington, D.C., after the CPT hostage crisis in Iraq, advocated for rights for First Nations communities through participation in the Right Relations Circle in Ft. Frances, and traveled to West Virginia to support groups protesting mountaintop removal mining. In connection with a fact-finding trip to Afghanistan and Pakistan in 2009, Stoltzfus became increasingly interested in researching the use of Predator drone warfare. In September 2009 he was arrested at Creech Air Force Base in a civil disobedience protest over recent drone attacks in Pakistan. Stoltzfus died on March 10, 2010, of heart failure while riding his motor-assisted bicycle near his home.

== Education ==
- B.A., Goshen College, 1962, in sociology
- M.A., American University, 1970, in Asian/Southeast Asian Studies
- M.Div., Associated Mennonite Biblical Seminary, 1973

== Quotes ==
- "A good nonviolent action is like a great work of art."
- "When I read the Bible I saw Jesus doing creative interventions, healings and actions that made the moral choices visible. I began to ask myself if I was as willing to die for my convictions as Vietnamese and American soldiers all around me were being asked to do. I was looking for a way to say yes to life instead of operating by static lines drawn by our church over the centuries. Later when I returned to theological studies, I realized my question was not a new question. During the most dynamic periods of creativity our churches had tried many ways to point to a different path. In fact many had died for their choices. I was coming to see myself as operating in that stream."
- "From India to Eastern Europe, from democratic movements in China to freedom walks in the USA, from little known villages in Afghanistan to farmers and fisherfolks in Colombia, people have discovered the power of nonviolent action… A few of us may be learning to listen, and to read these signs of the times."
- "It will take an expanding worldwide but grassroots culture reaching beyond national borders to fashion a body of Christian peacemakers to be an effective power to block the guns and be part of transforming each impending tragedy of war. Little by little there will be change."

== Bibliography: Primary sources for Gene Stoltzfus ==
=== Published writings ===
- "Seeing the City", The Other Side (January–February 1985).
- "Lifetime Peacemaker Award Speech", Peace and Justice Support Network of Mennonite Church, USA, July 7, 2003.
- Peace Probe blog (peaceprobe.wordpress.com), May 24, 2005 – March 13, 2010. Reprints or reposts of blog posts indicated below:
  - "Shine the Light: Seeing the Signs of the Times", Hyattsville Mennonite Church, January 15, 2006.
  - "Guilt--one of many voices", Geez, Issue 5 (Spring, 2007), pp. 18–20.
  - "The Impact of War on Poverty", Thai Binh Red Cross, June 18, 2007.
  - "Creating space", Peace and Justice Support Network of Mennonite Church, USA, September 3, 2007.
  - "Burma Reflection: Monks, soldiers, and civilians on the march", morepraxis.org.au, September 28, 2007.
  - "Monks and Amish", DreamSeeker Magazine Vol. 8, No. 3 (Summer 2008), pp. 10–12.
  - "About waterboarding, Mr. President", The Mennonite (July 8, 2008).
  - "Franz Jägerstätter - A Great Austrian Hero Who Died for Peace", Preda Foundation, July 31, 2008.
  - "Gaza: Just Such a Time as This", Root and Branch: Radical Christian Vision Network, January 8, 2009.
  - "Holy Week at Creech Air Force Base", Voices for Creative Nonviolence, April 7, 2009.
  - "Peacemaking in Pakhtoon Country", Sahar: The Voices of Pashtuns (December, 2009), pp. 21–23.
  - "In Defence of Santa Claus", Ekklesia, December 23, 2009.
- Create Space for Peace: Forty Years of Peacemaking, Gene Stoltzfus, 1940-2010, Dorothy Friesen and Marilen Abesamis, eds., Deerfield Beach, FL: Trimark Press, 2011. ISBN 978-0-9829702-4-9

=== Audio on the Web ===
- "Lifetime Peacemaker Award Speech", Peace and Justice Support Network of the Mennonite Church, USA, July 7, 2003.
- Radio interview, KOOP 91.7 FM (Austin, TX), October 3, 2008.
- "Compassion in Action", Wisdom in Nature: Contemplative and Ecological Community Activism (UK) monthly forum, January 2009.
- Public address, Cooke Centenary Church, Belfast, Northern Ireland, January 25, 2009.
- Chapel address, St. Olaf College, Northfield, MN, November 3, 2009.

=== Video ===
- "Gene in Belfast, Ireland, sharing CPT Iraq's Direct, Nonviolent Action Case Study", by Wilson Tan and Big Red Button, February 2009.
- "Gene Stoltzfus Memorial" on YouTube, by Mark Frey with Philip Stoltzfus, April 8, 2010.
- "Gene Stoltzfus on Motor-Assisted Bicycle" on YouTube, by Philip Stoltzfus, April 13, 2010.
- "Create Space for Peace book trailer" on YouTube, by Big Red Button, January 2011.
