= Washington Peace Center =

- Founded: 1963
- Founder: Larry Scott
- Purpose: Pacifism, social justice
- Location: Washington, D.C., United States
- Website: WashingtonPeaceCenter.org

The Washington Peace Center was a nonprofit organization founded and located in Washington, D.C., focusing on peace and social justice. It officially closed ceased operating in 2020.

The organization sought to provide education, support, and resources to activist groups. The Peace Center aimed to strategically link organizations to establish "structures and relationships that are nonviolent, non-hierarchical, humane and just."

The organization traces its roots to a group of activists led by Quaker Larry Scott who began a vigil to protest the development of biological and chemical weapons at Fort Detrick in 1959. In 1961, the group moved to Washington, D.C., and expanded their work to include peace education by organizing film screenings and discussions and publishing a local newspaper. It was formally organized as the Washington Peace Center in 1963.

== History ==
The Washington Peace Center grew from The Vigil to Stop Biological Weapons at Fort Detrick. In 1961, vigil coordinator Larry Scott and other supporters moved to Washington, D.C. to start the Washington Peace Action Center. The group also organised attendees for the 1963 March on Washington for Jobs and Justice.

The ratification of the Partial Test Ban Treaty between the United States, USSR and United Kingdom led to the transformation of The Peace Action Center into the Washington Peace Center in 1963.

The Peace Center was a hub for activity against the Vietnam War. During the 1970s the Center continued its work by supporting the movements against nuclear power and for nuclear disarmament. In the 1980s the Peace Center served as the local nexus for national and international opposition to the arms race and played a vital role in organizing resistance to the Reagan administration's interventions in Central America. The 1990s saw the Center contributing to social justice movements in opposition to racism and for justice for gay, lesbian, and transgender people. In the 2000s, the Center was involved with opposing the invasion and occupation of Iraq, countering military recruiters and attempting to institute a peace curriculum in area public schools, as well as working to close the Guantanamo Bay prison camp, ending torture and restoring civil liberties at home. Currently, the Peace Center fiscally sponsors several activist organizations in Washington D.C. including Witness Against Torture, the Fort Reno Summer Concert Series, the Hiroshima-Nagasaki Peace Committee, Positive Force, and the Civilian-Soldier Alliance, allowing these groups to raise funds without 501(c)(3) status. The Center organizes and hosts monthly skillshares as part of the DC Trainers Network in order to strengthen progressive social movements in Washington D.C. As the Center's current website states, the summation of all of these efforts is that, "We envision a world based on respect for people and the planet that is achieved through nonviolence, peace and social justice."

The Center is a not-for-profit organization focused on a variety of peace and social justice issues. The Center publishes the "Washington Peace Letter" bi-annually.

Currently the Center has three staff members, Sonia Silbert, Darakshan Raja, and Candice Jones.

== Records ==
The records of the Vigil at Fort Detrick, the Washington Peace Action Center, and the Washington Peace Center are housed at the Swarthmore College Peace Collection (http://www.swarthmore.edu/library/peace/).
