= John Dear =

American Catholic peace activist (born 1959)

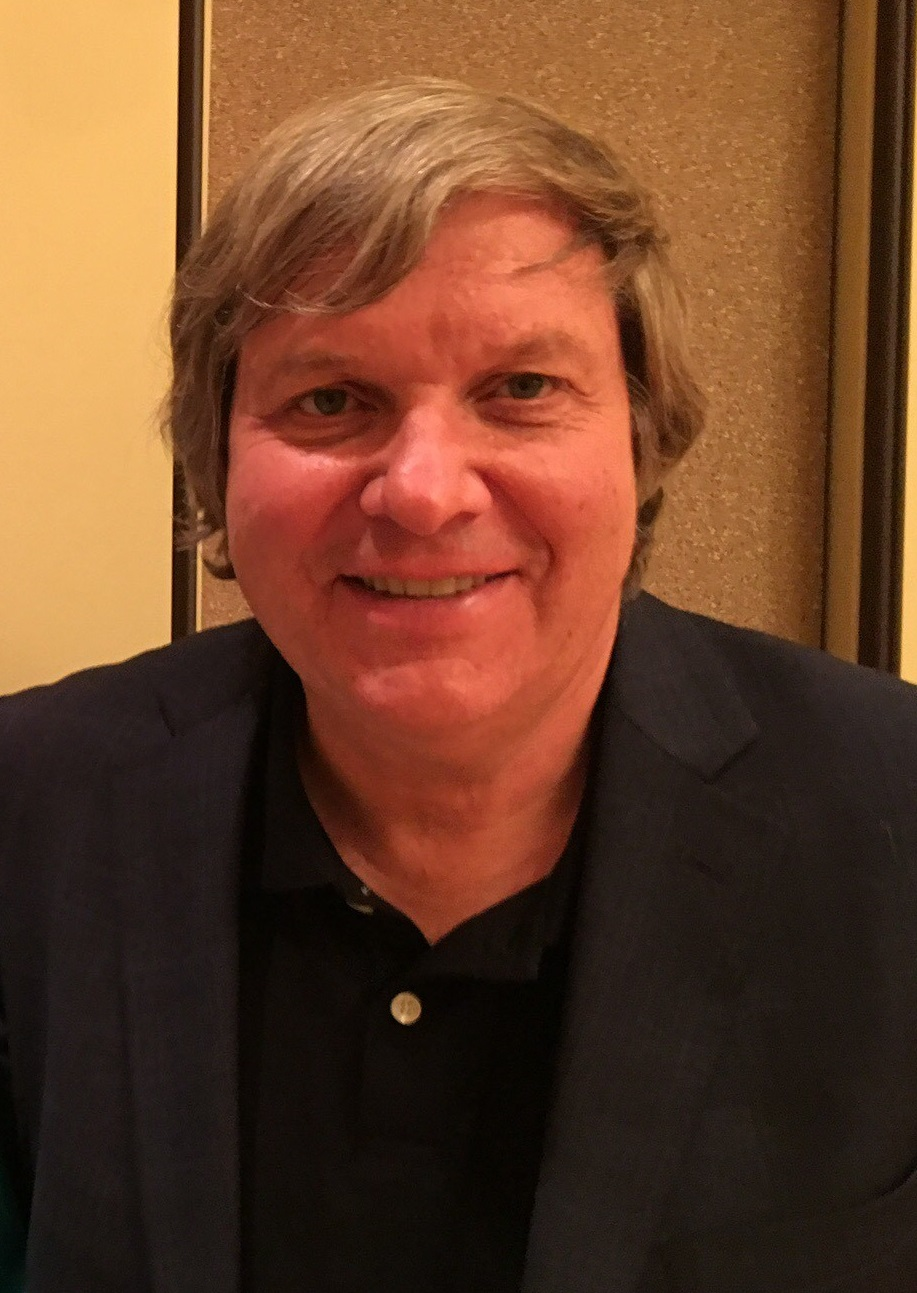
John Dear

John Dear (born August 13, 1959) is an American peace activist, lecturer, author and Catholic priest residing in the Diocese of Monterey in California.

Dear has written 40 books on Jesus, peace and nonviolence, and has been arrested 85 times in acts of nonviolent civil disobedience against war, injustice, poverty, racism, executions, nuclear weapons, and environmental destruction. He is the founder and director of the Beatitudes Center, where he offers the "Nonviolent Jesus Podcast".

== Biography ==
=== Early life ===
John Dear was born in Elizabeth City, North Carolina, on August 13, 1959 and graduated magna cum laude from Duke University, in Durham, North Carolina, in 1981. He then worked for the Robert F. Kennedy Memorial Foundation in Washington, D.C.

=== Jesuit formation ===
In August 1982, Dear entered the Society of Jesus, commonly known as the Jesuits, at their novitiate in Wernersville, Pennsylvania. He then spent two years studying philosophy at Fordham University in the Bronx, New York (1984–1986), during which time he lived and worked for the Jesuit Refugee Service in a refugee camp in El Salvador for three months in 1985.

For his period of regency, he taught at Scranton Preparatory School in Scranton, Pennsylvania, from 1986 to 1988. He then spent a year working at the Fr. McKenna Center, a drop-in center and shelter for the homeless, in Washington, D.C. From 1989 to 1993, he attended the Graduate Theological Union in Berkeley, California, and received two master's degrees in theology from the Jesuit School of Theology at Berkeley.

He was ordained a Catholic priest in Baltimore, Maryland, in 1993, and began serving as associate pastor of St. Aloysius Church in Washington, D.C.

=== Promoting peace and nonviolence ===
During his time teaching in Scranton in the late 1980s, he protested military recruitment at his school; in 1989 he protested the death of several Jesuits in El Salvador.

Dear founded Bay Area Pax Christi, a region of Pax Christi USA, the national Catholic peace movement. He began to arrange for Mother Teresa to intervene with various governors on behalf of people scheduled to be executed on death row.

Dear was arrested in scores of nonviolent civil disobedience actions against war, injustice and nuclear weapons - from the Pentagon to Livermore Laboratories in California. On December 7, 1993, he was arrested with three others at the Seymour Johnson Air Force Base in Goldsboro, North Carolina, for hammering on an F-15 nuclear capable fighter bomber. He had approval from the Jesuits for this protest. He was jailed, tried and convicted of two felony counts, and served seven-and-a-half months in North Carolina jails and four-and-a-half months, under house arrest in Washington, D.C., followed by 3 years probation. As part of the Plowshares disarmament movement, the defendants argued that they were fulfilling Isaiah's mandate to "beat swords into plowshares," and Jesus' command to "love your enemies."

From 1994 to 1996, Dear served as executive director of the Sacred Heart Center, a community center for low-income African-American women and children, in Richmond, Virginia. In the Spring of 1997, he taught theology for one semester at Fordham University in the Bronx, New York. From 1997 to 1998, he lived in Derry, Northern Ireland, as part of the Jesuit "tertianship" sabbatical program, and worked at a human rights center in Belfast.

From 1998 to 2001, Dear served as executive director of the Fellowship of Reconciliation. At that time it was the largest interfaith peace organization in the United States, based in Nyack, New York. In 1999, he led a delegation of Nobel Peace Prize winners on a peace mission to Iraq, and also an interfaith delegation to Palestine/Israel.

Immediately after September 11, 2001, Dear served as a Red Cross coordinator of chaplains at the Family Assistance Center in Manhattan, and personally counseled thousands of relatives and rescue workers. From 2002 to 2004, he served as pastor to five parishes in the high desert of northeastern New Mexico, and founded Pax Christi New Mexico, a region of Pax Christi USA.

In 2006, Dear led a demonstration against the U.S. war in Iraq in Santa Fe, New Mexico. In 2009, he joined the Creech 14 in a civil disobedience protest at Creech Air Force base against the U.S. drone war in Afghanistan and Pakistan, and was arrested and put in the Clark County, Nevada jail for a night. The group were later found guilty but given time served.

In January 2014, Dear left the Jesuits and wrote about his leaving in the National Catholic Reporter, saying that the Society of Jesus has turned from its commitment to social justice, and that he would not be permitted to work for peace and disarmament. Dear then moved to Big Sur, California where he remains a Catholic priest in good standing with faculties in residence in the Diocese of Monterey. From 2012 to 2020, he worked with Pace e Bene, a leading peace group and co-founded Campaign Nonviolence and the Nonviolent Cities Project. See: www.paceebene.org He also works with the Catholic Nonviolence Initiative, and helped draft Pope Francis' Jan. 1, 2017 World Day of Peace letter on nonviolence.

In 2020, he founded and is Executive Director of the Beatitudes Center for the Nonviolent Jesus. In 2025, he launched a weekly global podcast, "The Nonviolent Jesus Podcast."

He has been nominated for a Nobel Peace Prize several times, including by Archbishop Desmond Tutu.

Dear is a vegetarian.

=== Speaker, writer, teacher ===
Over the years, Dear has given thousands of lectures on peace, disarmament and nonviolence in churches, schools and groups across the United States, and around the world, including national speaking tours of Australia, New Zealand, Scotland, Canada and England.

Dear formerly wrote a weekly column for the National Catholic Reporter and the Huffington Post. He is also featured in several other books and featured in a wide variety of U.S. publications, including The New York Times and The Washington Post. He is featured in the DVD documentary film, The Narrow Path, and the subject of John Dear on Peace, by Patti Normile (St. Anthony Messenger Press, 2009). He has published over 40 books. His weekly free global podcast, "The Nonviolent Jesus Podcast," posts each Monday on apple, spotify, youtube, substack, the National Catholic Reporter, and many other platforms, as well as www.beatitudescenter.org

== Bibliography ==
- Disarming the Heart: Toward a Vow of Nonviolence (Foreword by John Stoner)
- Jean Donovan and the Call to Discipleship
- Christ Is With the Poor: Sayings of Horace McKenna, S.J. (Ed.)
- Our God Is Nonviolent: Witnesses in the Struggle for Peace and Justice (Foreword by Elizabeth McAlister)
- It's a Sin to Build a Nuclear Weapon: The Writings of Richard McSorley, S.J. (Ed.)
- Oscar Romero and the Nonviolent Struggle for Justice
- Seeds of Nonviolence (Foreword by Thomas Gumbleton)
- The God of Peace: Toward a Theology of Nonviolence (Foreword by James W. Douglass).
- The Sacrament of Civil Disobedience (Foreword by Daniel Berrigan) [Second Edition published in 2024, with foreword by Shane Claiborne]
- Peace Behind Bars: A Peacemaking Priest's Journal from Jail (Foreword by Philip Berrigan).
- The Road to Peace: Writings on Peace and Justice by Henri Nouwen (Ed.)
- Jesus the Rebel (Foreword by Daniel Berrigan)
- The Vision of Peace: Writings by Mairead Maguire (Foreword by the Dalai Lama) (Ed.)
- The Sound of Listening: A Retreat Journal from Thomas Merton's Hermitage
- And the Risen Bread: The Selected Poetry of Daniel Berrigan, S.J. (Ed.)
- Living Peace: A Spirituality of Contemplation and Action
- Christianity and Vegetarianism: Pursuing the Nonviolence of Jesus (online excerpt)
- Mohandas Gandhi: Essential Writings (Ed.)
- Mary of Nazareth, Prophet of Peace (Foreword by Joan Chittister)
- The Questions of Jesus (Foreword by Richard Rohr)
- Testimony: Essays by Daniel Berrigan (Ed.)
- Transfiguration (Foreword by Desmond Tutu)
- You Will Be My Witnesses (with icons by Rev. William McNichols)
- The Advent of Peace
- A Persistent Peace: An Autobiography (Foreword by Martin Sheen)
- Put Down Your Sword: Essays on Peace and Justice
- Daniel Berrigan: Essential Writings (Ed.)
- Lazarus Come Forth!: How Jesus Confronts the Culture of Death, and How We Can Too
- Thomas Merton Peacemaker
- The Nonviolent Life
- Radical Prayers
- They Will Inherit the Earth: Peace and Nonviolence in a Time of Climate Change
- The Beatitudes of Peace
- Walking the Way
- The Trouble with Our State: Poetry of Daniel Berrigan (ed.)
- Praise be Peace: Psalms of Peace and Creation in a time of war and climate change
- The Gospel of Peace: A Commentary on Matthew, Mark, and Luke from the Perspective of Nonviolence
- "Universal Love: Surrendering to the God of Peace," published by Orbis Books, Feb. 2026.
