= Witness Against Torture =

American human rights organisation

Witness Against Torture is a group calling for the closure of the Guantanamo Bay detention camp where the United States is holding prisoners as "unlawful enemy combatants". It was formed in 2005 when 25 Americans went to Guantánamo Bay and attempted to visit the detention facility.

== Actions and Demonstrations ==
The group was involved in the final demonstration of the "100 Days Campaign" on April 30, 2009. This was a demonstration to support the closing of Guantanamo 100 days after President Obama's executive order to close the Guantanamo Bay detention camp. The demonstration led to the arrest of Carmen Trotta, who led the demonstration, and 60 others.

On the twelfth of January 2012 thirty-seven members of the group demonstrated in front of the White House. After being warned to clear the sidewalk, they were individually arrested.

== Bibliography ==
- Brown, Anna J., ed. (November 18, 2008). Witness Against Torture : the campaign to shut down Guantánamo. Yellow Bike Press. ISBN 978-1-60725-507-9. OCLC 428980304.
